= Stefano Giovannoni =

Italian architect and designer

- Born: 1954 (age 71–72)
- Education: University of Florence
- Occupations: Designer, architect
- Notable work: Bombo
- Awards: Premio Lerici Pea Golfo dei Poeti
- Website: stefanogiovannoni.com

Stefano Giovannoni (born 1954) is an Italian architect and designer. He was one of the founders of the Bolidist movement. Giovannoni lives and works in Milan.

== Biography ==
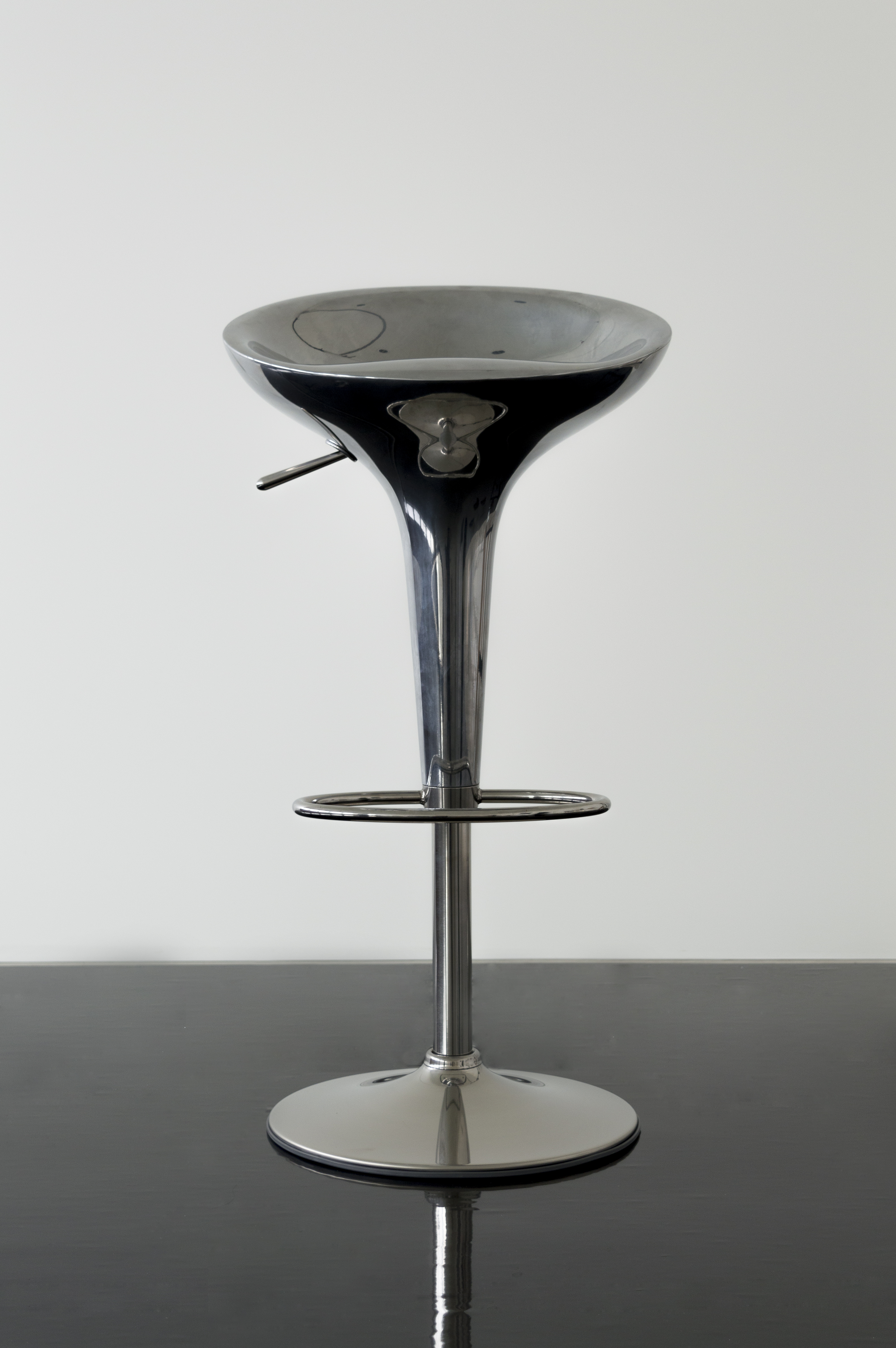
Bombo stool for Magis (1999)

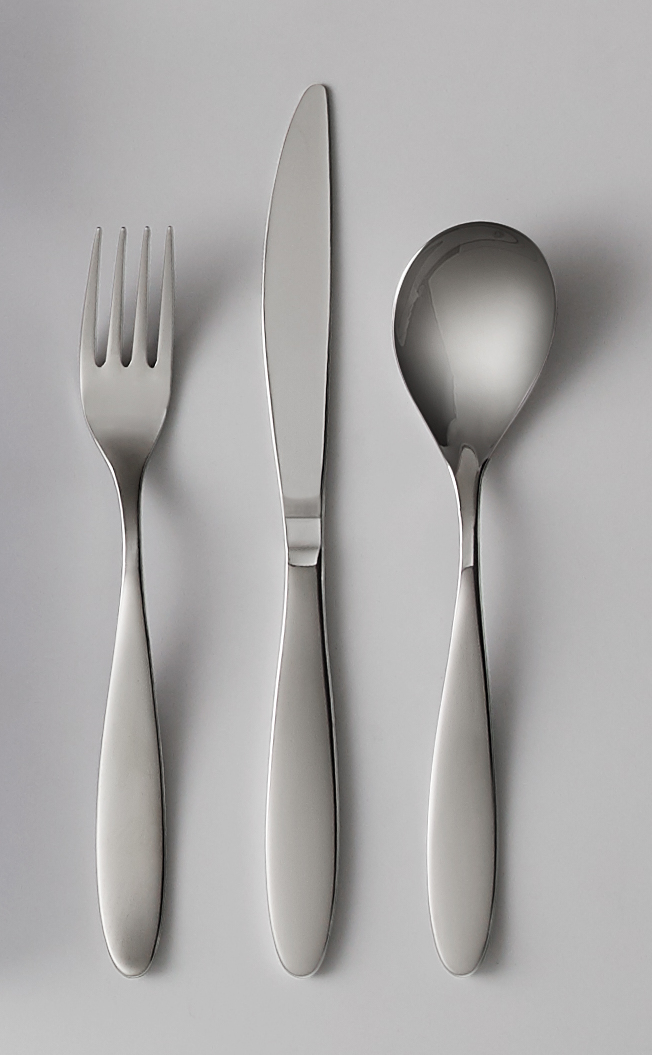
Mami cutlery for Alessi (1993)

Stefano Giovannoni was born in La Spezia in 1954. He studied architecture at the University of Florence, graduating in 1978. He continued his association with the university doing research and teaching until 1991. He has also taught at the Domus Academy in Milan, the University of Reggio Emilia, and at the Faculty of Architecture of the University of Genoa, where he was the chair of industrial design department.

In the late 1970s and early 1980s he collaborated with Ettore Sottsass and Alessandro Mendini at Studio Alchimia in Milan. He was also one of the co-founders of the Bolidist movement. In the mid-1980s, he and Guido Venturini founded a studio and designed products for companies such as Alessi, calling themselves King-Kong Productions.

Giovannoni has designed furniture, housewares, decorative objects, sanitary fittings, electronic devices, lighting, and interiors for companies such as Bisazza, Fiat, Flos, Laufen, Lavazza, Magis, Siemens, 3M, Toto, NTT Docomo.

Objects designed by Giovannoni are in collections such as the Museum of Modern Art and the Brooklyn Museum in New York, the Design Museum and the Museum of Design in Plastics (MoDiP) in the UK, and the Design Museum in Brussels.

Their collaborations with international designers such as Philippe Starck, Studio Job, Marcantonio, and the multidisciplinary artist Marco Oggian stand out, resulting in a series of products characterized by visual boldness and originality.

His Bombo (stool) for Magis was one of the most commercially successful design products of the early 2000s, and according to the designer, as of 2015 it was "the most copied design product in the world" with over 1,000 Chinese companies making unauthorised replicas.

In 2016 he launched a new company called qeeboo. The company manufactures furniture designed by Giovannoni and other well known designers such as Andrea Branzi, Estudio Campana, Studio Job, Alessandro Mendini, Satyendra Pakhale, Kris Ruhs, Philippe Starck, Marcel Wanders, and Nika Zupanc.

Giovannoni was awarded the 2020 Premio LericiPea Golfo dei Poeti.

He lives and works in a converted 1930s hydro-turbine factory which was once the seat of Riva Calzoni in Milan.
