= David Shaw Nicholls =

Scottish architect and designer

David Shaw Nicholls (born 1959) is a Scottish architect and designer based in New York City, Italy and Glasgow. He became internationally known by his minimalist ASFLEXI settee, conceived while in school.

== Life ==
Nicholls was born in 1959 in Bellshill, Scotland. Initially he went to Glasgow School of Art to study Fine Art, then attended Edinburgh College of Art, the University of Edinburgh and completed his master at Domus Academy in Milan, under the Course direction of Ettore Sottsass Jr.

Nicholls has exhibited at the inaugural City Art Centre (Edinburgh), British Design Craftsmen, the Edinburgh International Festival (1980), Charles Rennie Mackintosh and the Modern Movement, Fine Arts Society, curated by Roger Billcliffe (1981), the 3rd Venice Biennale of Architecture (1985), collaborating with Ettore Sottsass and Marco Zanini. He launched both his BEAST Furniture and Modern Rug Company at the International Contemporary Furniture Fair, ICFF New York, (from 1990).

== Furniture, interiors and architecture ==
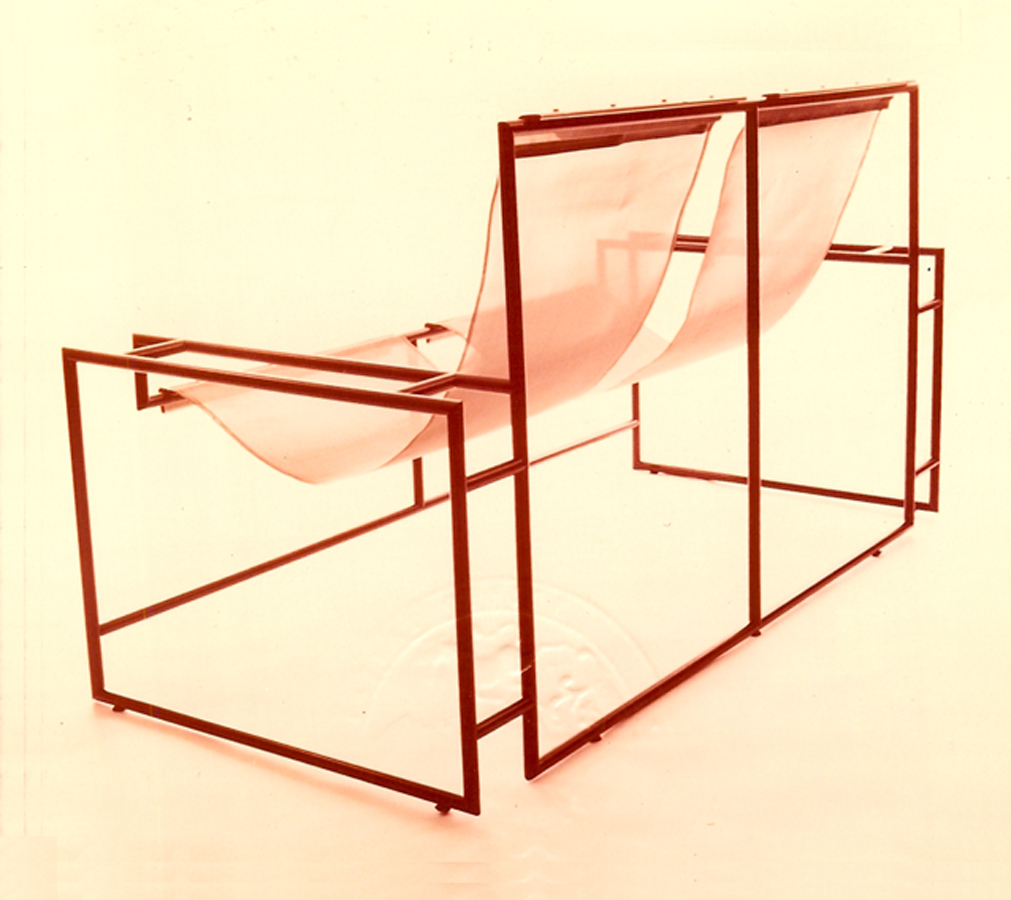
ASFLEXI two-seater

While in school in Scotland, Nicholls gained recognition for his two-seater welded tubular steel and stainless steel wire chair at Edinburgh College of Art. In 1980, Design reg. No.995257, his first prototypal piece, was acknowledged as “uncluttered and straightforward”, “a clean starting point and an attempt to reduce the object to its original state”. Alongside British Designer Craftsmen, John Makepeace and Martin Grierson, the collection was shown at the Edinburgh International Festival in 1980, in The Fine Arts Society in Glasgow, showing “Charles Rennie Mackintosh and The Modern Movement” in 1980, at the “Light” exhibition in “High-Tech”, Milan in 1983, alongside Gaetano Pesce, James Irvine, Philippe Starck, Jasper Morrison, Massimo Iosa Ghini, Ron Arad, “Shiro” and “other young guns”. The Asflexi prototypes were also editorialized extensively throughout the world during this period. (Domus, Modo, Abitare, Interni, Mobilla)

In the early 1980s he worked briefly for Sottsass Associati after completing his master's thesis with Sottsass at the Domus Academy from 1984 to 1985. Whilst in Milan, Nicholls also collaborated with Prospero Rasulo of Studio Alchimia and Nanda Vigo to design and re-define the interior of Bar Montmartre, Brera Milan in 1985.

In 1985 he moved to New York and launched his “BEAST” furniture line. Over 25 prototypes were produced to exact craftsmanship, comprising: Angus, Arianne, Arno and the Aston credenza. At its source, in the workshop this period also inspired a portfolio of freehand sketches in charcoal and silver wash. The studio also was active in product design and the “Hi-Tech” re-design of Tribeca lofts, where Nicholls resided (1986 – 2001).

== Nicholls Modern Carpets ==
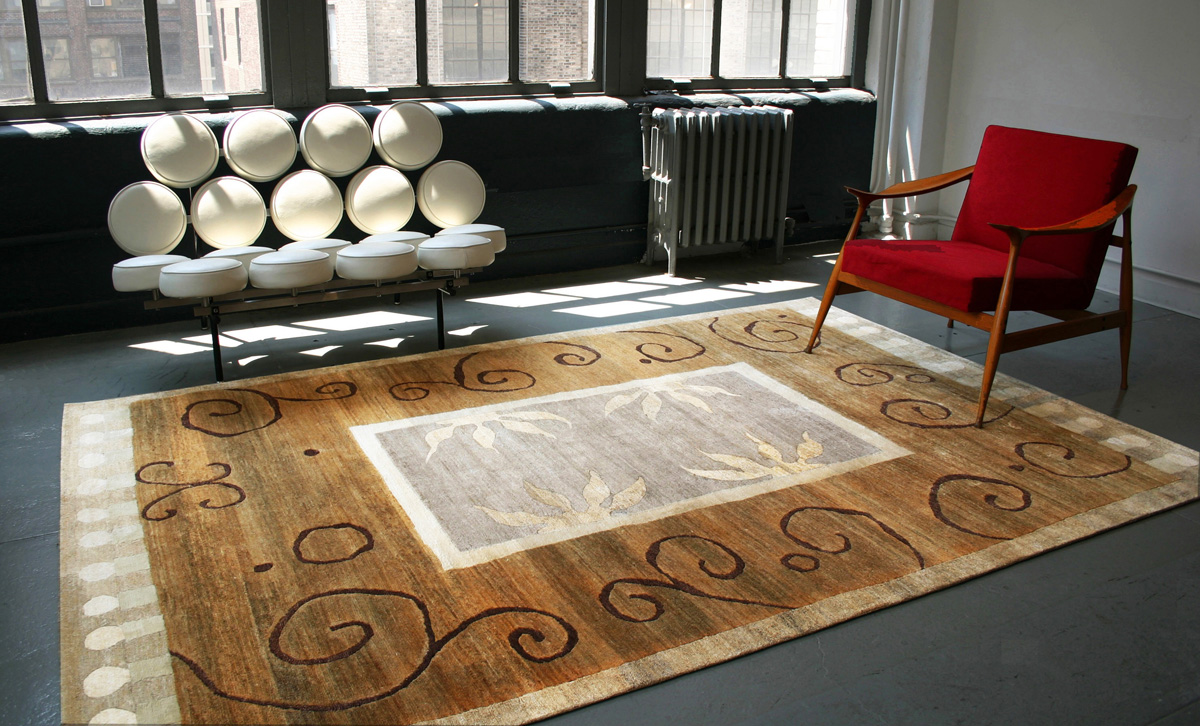
Havana Pureloom carpet

After setting up his own design firm in New York City, Nicholls created textile designs. The company has over 200 registered designs. Nicholls’ rugs and floor textiles have been published in Architectural Digest, The New York Times Magazine, Elle Decor, Interior Design and Vogue.

== Earth Years ==
Following the 2011 Tōhoku earthquake and tsunami, Nicholls developed Tsunami Mitigation architecture for the dispersion of wave energy and advantaged positioning of low-lying structures, for survival.

In April 2015, an earthquake struck in Nepal and killed over 8,000 people. Nicholls, from a family of Scottish engineers, executed an anti-seismic re-build of the Carpet factory in Kathmandu.

In 2017, Nicholls noted the “break-down” of “North Sea Oil and Gas” assets and set up Arkhabitat Limited as a company to re-work structures that anchor and float with the global tidal rise. The Geodesic Dome (Buckminster Fuller) provided fodder for research in the design of a protective, transparent shell with the ramp architecture housed safely within.

== Printmaking ==
In Glasgow, Nicholls started a printmaking project, which focused upon the process of metal plate etching. The subject matter initiated with his portfolio of original drawings produced throughout his life, particularly “The intense Drawing Years 2011- 2017 his travels across the world, the USA, Europe and Asia. The first edition is a depiction of Camelback Mountain, Phoenix, Arizona. At the Glasgow Print Studio, Museum standards are adhered to from start to finish, the first edition with an image size of 13.85” H x 59.5” L (35.2 x 152 cms.), marks it as one of the largest copper plate etchings ever produced by hand process.

== Other works ==
Nicholls has designed and proposed an Environmental Research Center and Tourist complex anchored by a tall tower on the banks of the Tay Firth near Dundee, Scotland and anchored by the V&A Museum. “The Spire” incorporates semi enclosed viewing platforms and global communications antenna.
