= Setsu & Shinobu Ito =

Japanese designers

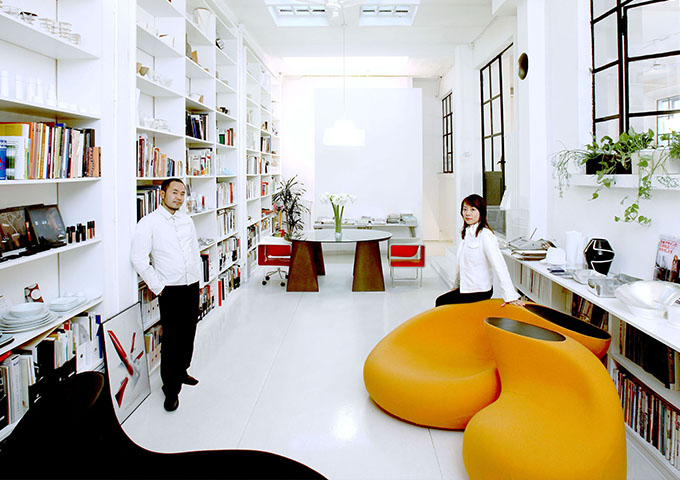
- Setsu & Shinobu Ito
- Website: www.studioito.com

Setsu and Shinobu Ito are Japanese designers. Their work is stored as permanent collections in the Modern Art Museums in Munich, Germany and Milan, Italy.

Both Setsu and Shinobu Ito are professors at the Research Center for Advanced Science and Technology at the University of Tokyo and the School of Design of the Polytechnic University of Milan. Setsu Ito is also a professor at the University of Tsukuba, and Shinobu Ito is a visiting professor at Tama Art University.

== Biography ==
Setsu and Shinobu Ito opened their design studio in Milan in 1997.

Setsu Ito, who graduated at the University of Tsukuba in Japan (1989), started collaborating with Alessandro Mendini in the Studio Alchimia and then with Angelo Mangiarotti.

Shinobu Ito graduated in textile design at Tama Art University in Tokyo (1988) and started her career for CBS Sony (present: Sony Music Entertainment) in Sony Creative Products. Heavily influenced as a student by postmodern Italian design, Shinobu later moved to Italy to attend the Domus Academy in Milan, where she met her future husband and business partner, Setsu Ito, who at the time was working as a tutor at the school. The pair were attracted to the city and, in 1997, they established a studio in Milan.

Their works have been presented and exhibited around the world and also have been published in many books and magazines.

They also received design awards such as: "Compasso d'Oro Menzione d'Onore" (2011, Italy), "Red Dot Award Best of the Best" (2016, Germany, Singapore), "Design Plus" (2016, Germany), "NY NOW Best Product" (2017, USA), "The Good Design Award" (2001, Japan), "Mastro della Pietra" (2019, Italy) and many other international design awards.

Some projects are a part of the permanent collection of the Die Neue Sammlung Design Museum in Munich (Germany) and the Triennale Design Museum in Milan (Italy). They are visiting professors of Domus Academy (2000–present, Italy), Polytechnic University of Milan (2006-2007, Setsu Ito / 2016-Present, Both, Italy), Istituto Universitario di Architettura di Venezia (2009, Italy), IED / Istituto Europeo di Design of Milan (1999–present, Italy), Raffles Milano (2017–2019, Italy) and the University of Tsukuba (2020–present, Setsu Ito, Japan), Tama Art University (2018–present, Shinobu Ito, Japan). Project Professor (2021–present, Setsu Ito) and Project Associate Professor (2021–present, Shinobu Ito) of the Research Center for Advanced Science & Technology at the University of Tokyo (Japan). They are members of the Associazione per il Disegno Industriale (Italy), board members of the Japan Fashion Color Association (Japan) and the Asia Pacific Designers Federation (China). They are judge of the International Design Awards including the International Forum Product Design Award (Germany), IAI Design Award (China).

Published a biography book “Setsu & Shinobu Ito_East-West Designer” (Logos Italy 2008).

== Representative works / projects ==
HOW -Stationery Collection (Nava_Italy) 2000 - 2006 A series of functional desktops and stationery with light and deep feeling in line with the shift to home offices in the IT era. Some of the products are a permanent collection of the Triennale Milano Design Museum and won a Good Design Award (2001, Japan)

ILY-I Interactive Armchair (Aisin_Japan) 2015
Developed a sofa-type personal mobility design that can be moved smartly from the elderly to young people in outdoor public facilities.It is equipped with an ultrasonic sensor and has an automatic braking system and light reaction function. With the addition of IoT functions, it aims to make home robots of furniture equipped with remote communication between families and health management functions.
Red Dot Award Best of the Best Award (2016, Germany, Singapore)

MY FUSION Collection long seller series Bowl and other Tableware object (Fratelli Guzzini) 2016
The world's first plastic three-color simultaneous mold and tableware series based on Guzzini's 3TECH technology, which led the development of post-war household plastic products. Expressed in a plastic container that is easy to use. Colors are inspired by the traditional Japanese lacquer articles.
DESIGN PLUS-Winner (2016, Germany)
NY NOW Award-Best New Product Winner (2016, USA)
Good Design Awards (2018, USA)

== Permanent collection ==
Triennale Design Museum in Milan (Italy)

Die Neue Sammlung Design Museum in Munich (Germany)

== Major awards ==
A Volkswagen New Beetle on display at the 2007 Melbourne Cup decorated with Shinobu Ito's selected main character graphic (or image symbol) for that event

1999 - The Young & Design Award (Italy)

2001 - Good Design Award (2001, Japan), The Toyama Product Design Award / Toyama Design Award (Japan)

2007 - Melbourne Cup / Selected Main Character Graphic (Australia)

2008 - Interior lifestyle Tokyo Award 2008 / Guzzini Foodesign Japan (Japan)

2011 - Compasso d'oro (Italy)

2011 - Compasso d'oro honorable mention (Italy)

2016 - Milano Design Award 2016 / Best Engagement (Italy), Red Dot Award 2016 Best of the Best (Germany, Singapore), DESIGN PLUS (Germany), JPC Japan Package Design Award / Cosmetic Goods Award (Japan)

2017 - NY NOW Best Product (USA)

2018 - Good Design Awards (USA)

2019 - Mastro d'arte della pietra (Italy)

== Publications ==
- Setsu & Shinobu Ito_East & West Designer (Virginio Briatore, Logos, Italy, ISBN 9788879408455)
- The international design yearbook 1998 (Richard Sapper, L. King, UK, ISBN 9781856691246)
- 50 products : innovations in design and materials (Mel Byars, Crans-Près-Céligny, Switzerland, ISBN 9782880463762)
- The international design yearbook 2000 (Ingo Maurer, Susan Andrew, L. King, UK, ISBN 9781856691802)
- The international design yearbook 2001 (Michele de Lucchi, L. King, UK, ISBN 9781856692366)
- The eco-design handbook : a complete sourcebook for the home and office. (Alastair Fuad-Luke, Thames & Hudson, UK, ISBN 9780500283431)
- The international design yearbook 2004 (Tom Dixon, L. King, UK, ISBN 9781856693929)
- YOUNG ASIAN DESIGNERS (Daab, Denmark, ISBN 9783937718415)
- New furniture design (Martin Rolshoven, Daab, Denmark, ISBN 9783937718286)
- Package design in Japan 2005 biennial. vol. 11 (Rikuyosha Co., Japan, ISBN 9784897375144)
- 1000 designs : and where to find them (Jennifer Hudson, L. King, UK, ISBN 9781856694667)
- Sekai no saishin chea dezain. (Toso, Japan, ISBN 9784924618725)
- PLASTIC (Cristian Campos, Collins Design, USA, ISBN 9780061242007)
- La Repubblica Grandi Guide - Arredamento & Design 2007-2008 (La Repubblica, Italy)
- The international design yearbook 2007 (Patricia Urquiola, Jennifer Hudson, L. King, UK, ISBN 9781856695169)
- Process : 50 product designs from concept to manufacture (L.King, UK, ISBN 9781856695411)
- Nihon dezain 50nen : Your next design. (Ei Shuppansha, Japan, ISBN 9784777911776)
- Ri ben no shou gan she ji = Touch of design (La Vie, China, ISBN 9789866555367)
- Il segno dei designer (Gianni Veneziano, Triennale Design Museum, Electa, Italy, ISBN 9788837074630)
- Purodakuto dezaina dezain jimusho nihyakusanjuroku shuroku (Seibundo, Japan, ISBN 9784416609293)
- LE LUCI E LA PIETRA (Giuseppe Coppola, Elect, Italy, ISBN 9788837076337)
- La Repubblica Grandi Guide - Arredamento & Design 2010-2011 (La Repubblica, Italy)
- Exhibition space design (HI-DESIGN PUBLISHING, Gao di guo ji HI-DESIGN PUBLISHING., China, ISBN 9787549548828)
- Biogenie : 99 people into design tales (Giulio Ceppi, Ezio Manzini, LISt Lab, Italy, ISBN 9788898774319)
- WA : l'essenza del design giapponese (Rossella Menegazzo, Stefania Piotti, L'ippocampo, Italy, ISBN 9788867220939)
- Maledetto Design (Alessandra Coppa, Centauria, Italy, ISBN 9788869214028)
- Japanese Architects and Designers from Studio Mangiarotti (Maggioli Editore, Italy, ISBN 9788838761041)
- Purodakuto dezain no hirogari : hikaku dezain bunkaron. (Kogyo Chosakai, Japan, ISBN 9784769370925)
- Creators file-for living (Gyappu, Japan, ISBN 9784883570584)
- Creators file-for living 2 (Gyappu, Japan, ISBN 9784901594189)
- Tsukuba Design 1953 - 1991 (The Tsukuba University School of Art & Design Industrial Design, Japan)
- Tsukuba Design 2 (The Tsukuba University School of Art & Design Industrial Design, Japan)
- Italian Designer's Book (JETRO, Japan)
- Le ricetta dei designer (Editrice Compositori, Italy, ISBN 9788877946836)
- Le ricetta dei designer 2 (Editrice Compositori, ItalY, ISBN 9788877947161)
- Pane e design (Editrice Compositori, Italy, ISBN 9788877948021)
- Design al sangue (Editrice Compositori, Italy, ISBN 9788877948250)
- Design al dente (Editrice Compositori, Italy, ISBN 9788877947826)
- Stuzzicati dal design (Editrice Compositori, Italy, ISBN 9788877947604)
- Una spina nel design (Editrice Compositori, Italy, ISBN 9788877947956)
- Cavolo che design (Editrice Compositori, Italy, ISBN 9788877947482)
- Multipli di cibo Foodesign Guzzini Made in Japan (BIEFFE, Italy, ASIN: B00QV9J08M)
