= Atelier Mendini =

Practice information
- Key architects: Alessandro and Francesco Mendini
- Founded: 1989
- Location: Milan, Italy

Significant works and honors
- Buildings: Groninger Museum, Museo del Casalingo
- Design: Torre Paradiso

Website
- www.ateliermendini.it

Atelier Mendini is a design and architecture studio based in Milan, Italy. It was founded in 1989 by two architect brothers Alessandro and Francesco Mendini. The Atelier consists of various design professionals: including architects, graphic designers, and industrial designers. It also has a special department dedicated to project research and experimentation in materials.

== The Atelier ==
Alessandro and Francesco Mendini together opened and ran Atelier Mendini in 1989. Andrea Balzari, Bruno Gregori, Alex Mocika and Emanuela Morra later joined as a junior partners of the Atelier since 2000. Alessandro Mendini’s focus is on objects, furniture, concept interiors, paintings, installations and architecture. Francesco Menidni is in charge of architectural projects and exhibitions within the Atelier.

Atelier Mendini is well recognized for the notability of their two founders, Alessandro and Francesco Mendini, prior to the opening of the Atelier. Alessandro Mendini is considered one of the well-known figures in contemporary design, known for his critical analysis of “postmodern design” and “re-design” since the 1970s. He has created, built, published, various of works that opens a new face for design as we knew today. Francesco Mendini has also been involved in various architectural and urban planning projects in Italy and worldwide.

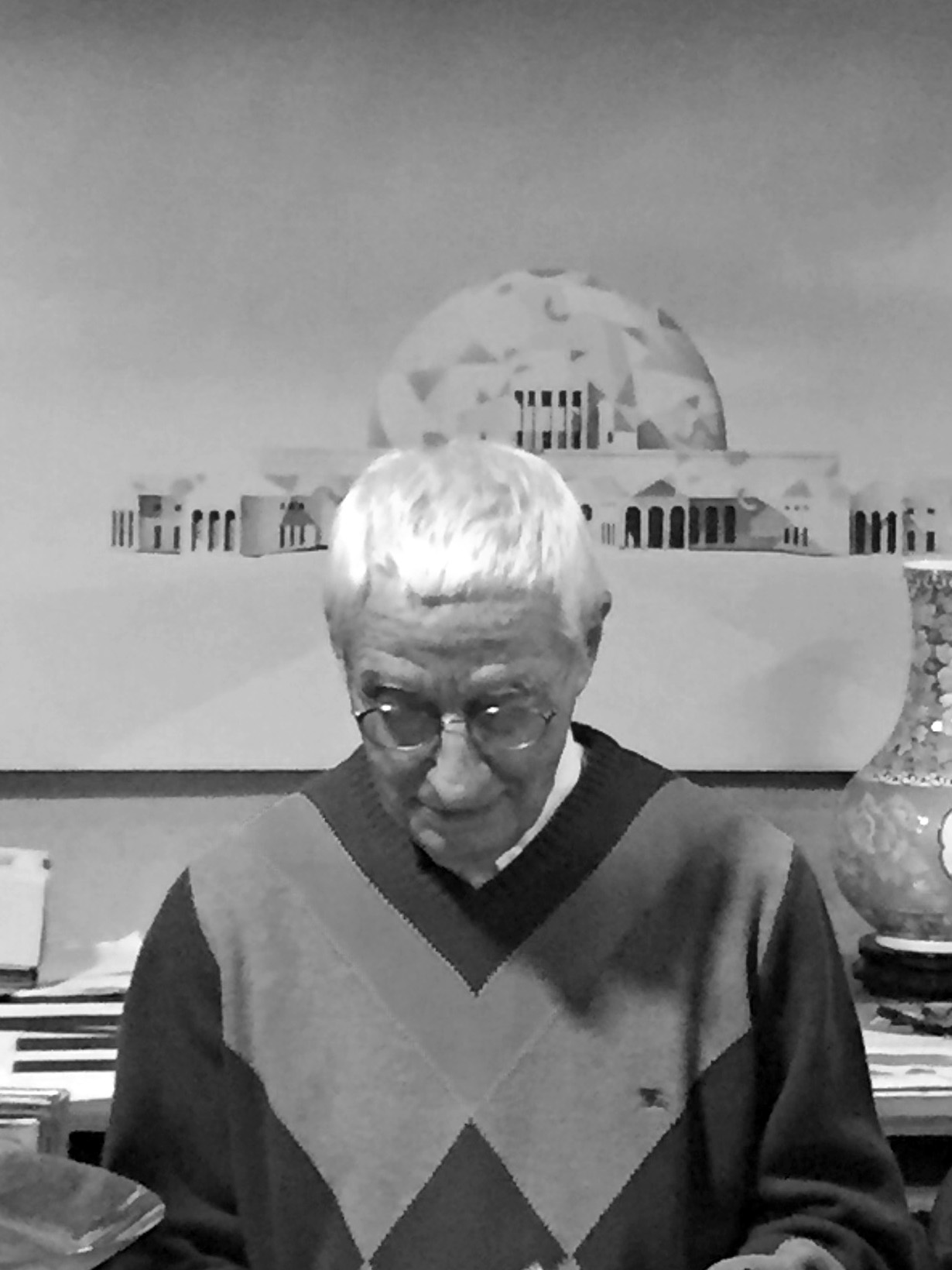
Alessandro Mendini in his studio

=== Alessandro Mendini ===
Alessandro Mendini was born in Milan, Italy in 1931. Graduated with an architecture degree from Politecnico di Milano in 1959, he started his career as a designer with Marcello Nizzoli, an Italian artist, designer, and architect. Alessandro is considered one of the greatest figure in twentieth century design. He has produced countless of important works ranging from publications, graphic, furniture, interior, architecture, and even writing of several books. He was also an early member of Studio Alchimia which he joined in 1979 and co-founded Domus Academy in 1982. He also directed the Casabella, Modo and Domus magazine.

=== Francesco Mendini ===
Francesco Mendini was born in Milan, Italy in 1939. He started his career with Nizzoli Associates. Francesco Mendini focuses primarily on industrialization and engineering in construction. He is a consultant to different building research bureaus and the National Research Council in Italy.

== Projects ==
The Atelier has worked for clients in more than thirty countries, with some of their notable projects includes a tower in Hiroshima, Japan; the Groninger Museum in the Netherlands; Alessi factory in Omega; and urban planning consultancy for several cities in Korea. They are also notable for their object, furniture, interior, painting, and installation design and collaborations, mostly oversaw by Alessandro Mendini. The projects includes collaboration with Alessi, Philips, Cartier, Swatch, Hermès and Venini.

A full list of projects by Alessandro and/with Francesco Mendini prior to and after the establishment of Atelier Mendini can be found in the archive of the Atelier.

=== Notable Projects ===
- Torre Paradiso, Hiroshima, Japan 1988
- Groninger Museum, Groningen, the Netherlands 1988–1994
- Museo del Casalingo - Forum Megna, 1996
- Parrot Corkscrews For Alessi 2013
