= Mendini =

Mendini is a surname. Notable people with the surname include:

- Alessandro Mendini (1931–2019), Italian designer and architect
  - Atelier Mendini, Italian design and architecture studio based in Milan
- Douglas A. Mendini (1953–2016), Italian author
