= Rick Kaufmann =

American gallerist (born 1947)

Richard Carl Kaufmann (April 28, 1947 – November 2, 2024) was an American gallerist associated with the art furniture movement of the 1980s. He operated the Art et Industrie gallery in the SoHo neighborhood of New York City.

== Biography ==
Kaufmann was born in Detroit, Michigan, and did not receive formal art education. As a teenager, he worked in a tool-and-die shop. In the late 1960s, he traveled to Tangier, Morocco, where he met painter Tracy Rust, who became his lifelong partner. The couple later lived briefly in Paris before moving to New York City, where they initially ran an antiques business. Kaufmann established the first Art et Industrie showroom in Lower Manhattan in the late 1970s, borrowing the gallery's name from an early-20th-century French design publication.

From the late 1970s through the late 1990s, Art et Industrie occupied five locations in Manhattan, exhibiting work that Kaufmann termed "art furniture." Influenced by contemporary Italian postmodern design groups such as Studio Alchimia and the Memphis Group, the artists featured in the gallery created limited-edition and one-of-a-kind objects that emphasized concept and visual form over practical function. Artists exhibited at Art et Industrie included Howard Meister, known for steel chairs with narrative titles; Forrest Myers, who produced minimalist sculptural pieces in aluminum; and Michele Oka Doner, who created the cast-bronze "Terrible Chair," an object regarded as more sculptural than practical.

After closing Art et Industrie, Kaufmann briefly engaged in selling early jazz and blues records, ending this activity with the rise of online commerce. He died from throat cancer at age 77.
