= Paola Navone =

Italian designer

Paola Navone is an Italian architect and designer. She was born 1950 in Turin, Italy.

== Early life and education ==
She grew up in Turin and went on to study at the Polytechnic University in the city and graduated in 1973. While she was there she studied architecture and after moved to Milan to start her life as a designer.

== Career ==
Paola Navone has worked in many creative industries as an architect, product designer, business consultant, interior designer, shop and restaurant designer, exhibition and event organizer, lecturer and teacher. She is a self-proclaimed work addict with many skills and passions. Her clients have included Driade, Swarovski, Abet Laminati, Casamilano, Alessi, Knoll International, Cappellini, Roche Bobois, Armani Casa, Martinelli Luce, and Habitat. From 1970-1980, she made her way up by working alongside Alessandro Mendini, Ettore Sottsass Jr, and Andrea Branzi in a group called Alchimia.

Navone has always had a disregard for convention, which she developed during her time with the 'antidesign' rebels led by Mendini and Sottsass. 'It was crazy, what we did. Working like mad to produce the utterly useless,' she says. 'But it was a catalyst. It produced a lot of energy and gradually, much later, our inventive thinking has been absorbed by industry.'

In 1983, she won the prestigious Osaka International Design Award for Abet Laminati. She was supposed to enter only one design but instead she entered 50 because she could not pick just one. In her later works, she has collaborated with Crate & Barrel and Anthropologie.

In 2023 she organised an exhibition titled Take It Or Leave It at the annual Milan Furniture Fair. The unusual show presents hundreds of objects and curiosities selected by the designer to be distributed to the holders of a winning ticket thus transforming each object through "a radical form of upcycling and reuse."
