= Bruno Rey =

Swiss industrial designer (1935–2019)

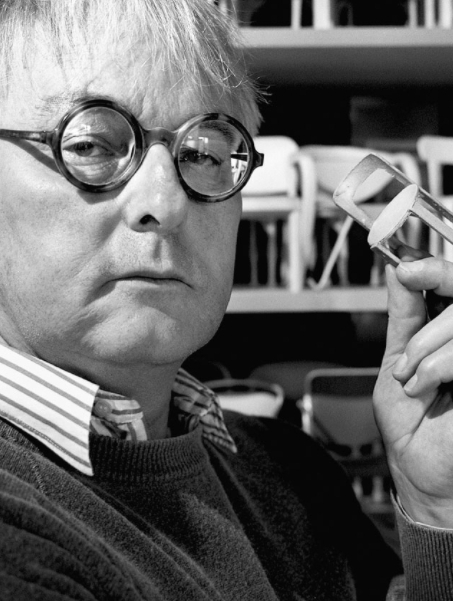
- Rey with a miniature of his Rey Chair, 2000
- Born: 1935; Brugg
- Died: 2017 (aged 81–82); Gebenstorf
- Occupation: Designer

Bruno Rey (1935–2019) was a Swiss industrial designer, best known for the Rey chair model 3300, one of the most successful Swiss chairs of all time. Over the course of his career, Rey built and rebuilt many other diverse projects. He designed rooms and exhibitions, like the control room at the Mühleberg Nuclear Power Plant in the Canton of Berne; designed gardens and plant containers made from fiber cement for the company Eternit AG.

== Biography ==
Rey was born in Brugg in the canton of Aargau, Switzerland. He completed an apprenticeship as a cabinetmaker before attending the Kunstgewerbeschule Zürich (today ZHdK) in 1957. He received his diploma in 1960 from the interior design class led by Willy Guhl (1915–2004), a pioneering Swiss furniture designer and one of the first industrial designers in Switzerland. Guhl was best known for his Loop Chair from 1954, made of a fibre cement called Eternit, and then bent into the chair's distinctive wedge-shaped loop.

After graduating, Rey travelled extensively in Switzerland as well as abroad, then took up an internship with the interior designer Paul Sumi from Biel, who sensitized Rey for chairs as design objects. For four years, Rey worked for an architectural office that furnished the Intercontinental Hotel in Geneva. During this time, he took his first independent but still casual interest in furniture. In 1966, amongst other reputable designers like Andreas Christen, Eugen Gomringer, Willy Guhl and Kurt Thut, he became the co-founder of the Swiss Design Association (SDA). This was at a time when the word "designer" or "industrial designer" was only slowly finding its way into everyday language.

Two years later, in 1968, Rey founded his own studio for architecture and industrial design in Baden. In the late 1960s, he started collaborating with the Swiss furniture company Dietiker & Co. in Stein am Rhein, and developed several chair series for them between 1970 and 1984. From 1970 to 1979, he designed chairs for the German furniture manufacturer, Kusch+Co, like brown dining chairs in leather and beech from 1971, which were also stackable.

During his career as an industrial designer, Rey experimented with a variety of materials. Until 1971, inspired by Charles Eames, he explored plastic chairs made of a few moulded parts. In an interview for the Swiss design magazine Hochparterre he commented, "I felt I was on the right track, a modern and innovative track". Rey developed models and prototypes at his own expense, but their production never happened, "which was a failure and at that time hard to digest," he admitted.

He also experimented with wood, searching for the design of a contemporary wooden chair as a symbol of the present. He ultimately found inspiration in the Thonet bentwood chair from 1850. In an interview with Hochparterre he said, "The idea of designing the plywood seat as a strong base, so that the frame could be omitted, initiated the meticulous search for a connecting piece between the seat and the feet. Aluminium seemed right, although the first chairs wobbled vigorously and did not last long."

== The Rey Chair ==
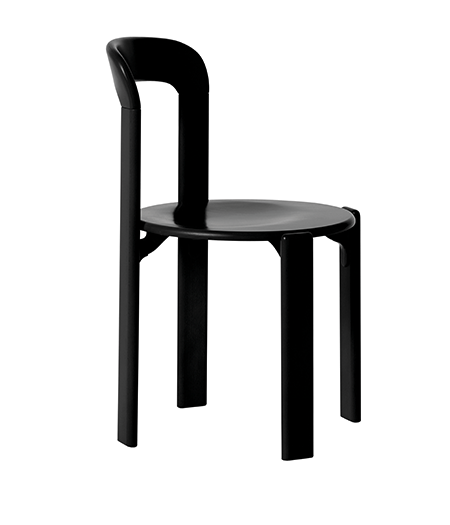
The Rey chair – Designed in 1971 for Dietiker Switzerland – An icon of Swiss Design

The design that emerged from a period of experimentation was model 3300, the Rey chair, which became one of the most iconic pieces of Swiss industrial design. Made of local beech wood, it was constructed with a unique, screw-less metal-to-wood connection. It went into serial production in 1971 and was the first chair to be patented by Dietiker a year later.

In Rey's design, the chair legs are joined to the self-supporting round seat by means of a bonded aluminium console that was still handmade in 1970/71 using sand casting and afterwards produced using gravity die casting. In 1989, the invention of aluminium pressure die casting then allowed for the industrial production of the chair in large series. Except for the final finishing, the entire production process could then be done by machine, including the glueing of the wood and metal at a bonding carousel.

The chair was available with a plain solid wood or an upholstered seat and was also manufactured in other variations, like a bar stool and a stool. The client could also choose from a large selection of colours for the finish.

In 2014, Bruno Rey's model 3300 was also produced in a junior edition.

== Bruno Rey & Charles Polin ==
In 1977, Rey started collaborating with designer Charles Polin (born 1951), who specialised in seating for public and private spaces. They had the goal, "to create a chair with universal functionality and not just a flash in the pan." During a four-year development period, they created the first joint chair model and presented the final result in 1980: the Quadro W chair, which was a technological innovation combining a simple form with good sitting comfort. The frames of both the seat and the back consist of flat, solid beech wood profiles and are connected with chrome-plated, flexible steel springs. The name Quadro is derived from those very four flex springs that connect the seat and back. The legs swing out from the seat's frame, making all chairs stackable. Dietiker launched the Quadro W chair in 1989.

In 1987, Rey moved his studio from the old town of Baden to the former farming village of Gebenstorf. Rey and Polin worked as official partners together in a converted farmhouse, which had a drawing room and an extensive workshop, which was also fully equipped for model making. They developed numerous award-winning furniture pieces for companies such as Hiller Objektmöbel, Kusch+Co and Plank GmbH. For Dietiker, the team designed next to the Quadro W stacking chair, the Patron restaurant chair. In 1995, Bruno Rey and Charles Polin launched the table XY.

== Furniture Designs by Bruno Rey ==
- Caslon, plant container – Made for Eternit AG. Asbestos cement, metal base; design Switzerland 1959.
- Bar Stools in Leatherette – Made for Dietiker. Birch, leatherette and metal; design Switzerland 1970, produced 1970–1979.
- Brown dining chair. – Made for Kusch + Co. Leather and beech, stackable; design Switzerland 1971.
- Rey chair Model 3300 – Made for Dietiker. Beech, cast aluminium, plastic glides; design and production, Switzerland 1971.
- Program 33 stools, chairs, tables – Made for Dietiker + Co AG, 1972.
- Quadro W chair – Made for Dietiker with Charles Polin. Beech, chrome plating; designed and produced in Switzerland, design period 1980–1989, production to date.
- XY Table – Made for Dietiker with Charles Polin. Chrome-plated steel tube, in veneer, solid wood, diagonal massive wood in beech, or linoleum; design and product launch 1992

== Philosophy ==
Rey's search for organic forms in contrast to the stubborn formalism of the 1960s and 70s was also a personal revolution against the prevailing design doctrine of his time; an attempt to distance himself from an existing generation of designers.

In light of the angular-formalistic, cubically austere furniture without any seating quality, which was common at the time and that forced an alignment with the walls, I suspected for the first time that new, round furniture forms could be both necessary and useful for the space and people. –– Bruno Rey I want to make complex relationships visible and manageable, instead of contributing even more to the superfluous and superficial. ––Bruno Rey

== Bibliography ==
Frey, Gilbert, Claude Lichtenstein and Arthur Rüegg. Schweizer Möbeldesign 1927–1984. Mobilier Suisse Création De 1927–1984. Exhibition catalogue, 15 April – 21 May 1986. Bern: Benteli, 1986.

Rüegg, Arthur (ed.). Swiss Furniture and Interiors in the 20th Century. In Collaboration with the Museum für Gestaltung Zürich, Design-Sammlung, the Gesellschaft für Schweizerische Kunstgeschichte GSK and the Eidg. Technische Hochschule Zürich, Department of Architecture. Basel: Birkhäuser, 2002.
