= Joseph Grima (architect) =

British architect, critic, curator, and editor

- Born: Avignon, France
- Education: Architectural Association (2003)
- Occupations: Architect, curator, critic

Joseph Grima is a British architect, critic, curator and editor. He is the creative director of Design Academy Eindhoven and co-founder of the design research studio, Space Caviar.

== Career ==
Grima graduated from Architectural Association in 2003 and then became the curator of the Biennale Interieur in Kortrijk Istanbul Design Biennial and the director of Chicago Architecture Biennial. He also became the director of the Ideas City festival at New Museum.

In 2011, Grima became the editor-in-chief of Domus, and stayed on till 2013. He has also been Director of Storefront for Art and Architecture, NYC and the Artistic Director of Matera; European Capital of Culture 2019. In 2013, together with Tamar Shafrir, Grima founded Space Caviar; an architecture and research studio operating at the intersection of design, technology, politics and the public realm. One of the projects, FOMO algorithm-generated journalism machine, was presented in the 2014 Milan Design Week for automatically creating magazine articles from live speech as well as social media.

Recurring themes in the work of Space Caviar include the impact of media and technology on social relations, and the design of domesticity. As curator of Biennale Interieur, Space Caviar presented a series of works and exhibitions including The Theatre of Everyday Life and the film Fortress of Solitude, which were together poised to ask challenging questions on the past, present and future of the home under the umbrella title SQM: The Home Does Not Exist.

Grima has held various academic / teaching positions at Strelka Institute, Architectural Association and at Bartlett School of Architecture under Sir Banister Fletcher Visiting Professorship.

In 2017, Grima was appointed as the creative director of Design Academy Eindhoven.

== Works ==
Some of notable works by Grima include:

- Player Piano: A Subjective Atlas of a Landscape of Labour.
- Kortrijk Interieur Biennale.
- RAM House.
- Chicago Architecture Biennale 2015.
- Archipelago di Ocno, Mantova.
- FOMO.
