= Ico Migliore =

Italian ice hockey player

Lodovico Migliore
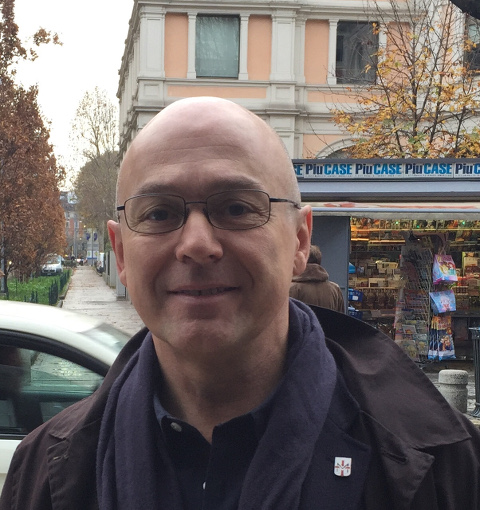
- Born: 27 December 1956 (age 69) Turin, Italy
- Position: wing
- Shot: right
- Played for: HC Bolzano; HC Valpellice; AS Mastini Varese Hockey; HC Milano Saima
- National team: Italy
- Playing career: 1978–1990

Lodovico Migliore, nicknamed Ico (born 1956), is an Italian architect, designer, professor and former professional ice hockey player. He is professor at the School of Design of the Polytechnic University of Milan and he is Chair Professor of the College of Design at Busan Dongseo University in South Korea. He served as chairman of Hockey Milano Rossoblu, an ice hockey team in Elite.A based out of Milan, Italy from 2010 to 2016. He also competed in the men's tournament at the 1984 Winter Olympics.

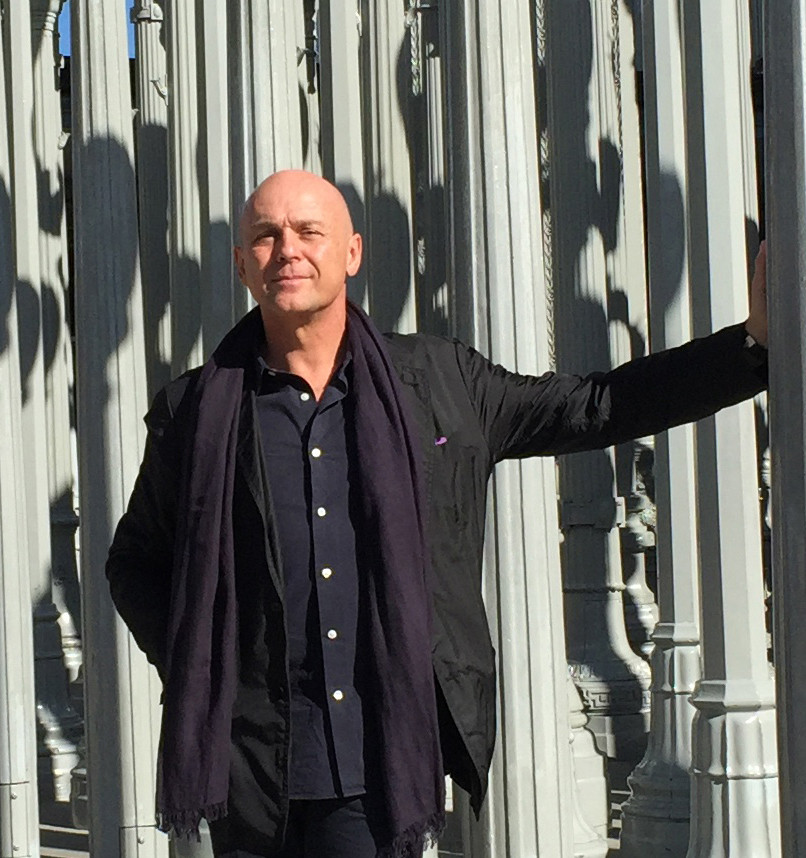

== Biography ==
Ico Migliore started playing ice hockey in Turin, He first joined the Valpellice team, and then he played three seasons for those of Bolzano and Varese. In the meantime, he received his degree in architecture from Polytechnic University of Turin under the supervision of Professor Achille Castiglioni. He started working with Castiglioni at Polytechnic University of Milan where he moved in 1986, and played for Milan Saiman as the captain of the team until 1990.

In 1997 he co-founded, with Mara Servetto, Migliore + Servetto Architects, an architecture firm which creates, together with an international team of architects and designers, projects on various scales: from architecture to interior design; from urban design to temporary exhibitions; from museum to communication projects. These projects, diversified as they are, create innovative places that have a major impact on people. Architectures, interior and exhibition design projects characterized by an expressive use of light and new technologies.

He is professor at the Polytechnic University of Milan (School of Design). He is also Chair Professor of the College of Design at Busan Dongseo University in South Korea.

He has been awarded many international prizes, such as the XXI (2008), XXIII (2014), XXV (2018) ADI Compasso d'Oro (Ita), five Honorable Mentions ADI Compasso d'Oro (Ita), eleven Red Dot Design Award (Ger), two German Design Award (Ger), two FX Interior Design Award (UK), the Annual Exhibit Design Award (US), two International Design Award (US) and the ASAL Exhibition Design of the Year (Ita).

Ico Migliore has been a member of scientific committees and juries for national and international contests on interior and spatial design organised by universities and institutions. Among these, he was one of the nine jury members of BIE (Bureau International des Expositions) for the Official Participants Awards Milan Expo 2015. Lately, he has been selected as one of the members of the scientific committee for the 3rd Architecture Exhibition of Pisa (Biennale) “The Time of Water” (2019).

In 2010, his works were mentioned in the encyclopedia entry “Allestire oggi – Progetti paradigmatici” (Exhibiting Today – Paradigmatic Projects) written by Italo Lupi and Beppe Finessi for the Treccani Italian Encyclopaedia of the 21st Century in the section dedicated to spaces and arts.

His son Tommaso is an ice hockey player; his daughter Carola is a fencing player.

== Sport ==
Migliore played on the highest level with HC Bolzano (1978–1980 and 1982–1983), HC Valpellice (1981–1982), Mastini Varese (1983–86) and HC Milan Saima (1988–1990), two seasons in B, with Milan Saima (1986–88). He was the team captain of Mastini Varese and HC Milan Saima. He won two championships A1, both with Bolzano (1978–79 and 1982–83) and he gained two promotion with HC Valpellice and HC Milan Saima. He was in the Italian national team for a long time (remarkable beginning with a goal on 20 February 1978 during a tune-up game lost 8–3 in Lugano against Switzerland B). He participated in Olympics (Sarajevo 1984), and four World Cup (one season in A - 1983; and three seasons in B - 1985,1986 e 1987). He won a bronze medal (1985) and a silver medal (1986) for. In the World Cup at Canazei Migliore is the team's captain. He was awarded the bronze Medal of Sporting Honor by Italian National Olympic Committee.

== Management ==
Since he stopped playing, Migliore became a manager. He first worked with HC Milan Saima, until the dissolution in 1998. He continued with the temporary partnership between Milan Vipers and Cortina called SG Cortina-Milan, and then with Milan Vipers, in the capacity of deputy manager, managing director and Technical Manager, ten years long. With Milan Vipers he won 5 championships in a row, 3 Italy Cup e 3 Italian Super Cup, as well as a silver medal in Continental Cup in 2002. After the Vipers’ dissolution by the president Alvise di Canossa, Migliore e Tiziano Terragni created 'Hockey Milan Rossoblu, which took up Vipers's legacy. The team started from A2 series, it then obtained the promotion in 2012, and came back in the Championship from 2012 to 2013 until now. In 2012 he was awarded the Region of Lombardy's Rosa Camuna for his engagement in sport's promotion. In 2014, he was awarded Ambrogino d'Oro for his role as the president of the Hockey Milan Rosso Blu.
