= Hockey Milano Rossoblu =

Italian ice hockey team

Milano Rossoblu
- City: Milan, Italy
- League: Alps Hockey League
- Founded: 2008
- Folded: 2022
- Home arena: Stadio del Ghiaccio Agorà (capacity: 4.000)
- President: (Italy) Ico Migliore
- Head coach: (Canada) Pat Curcio
- Website: www.hockeymilano.it

Franchise history
- Hockey Milano Rossoblu

Hockey Milano Rossoblu was an ice hockey team from Milan, Italy. It replaced Milano Vipers (league team 5 times Italian Champion) after that organization was disbanded in 2008. They played in the Alps Hockey League, joining in 2018 after replacing HC Neumarkt-Egna, which withdrew due to financial difficulties.

== History ==
=== Foundation ===
After the disbandment of the Milano Vipers in 2008, former executives of the Vipers led by Ico Migliore and Tiziano Terragni, announced the foundation of a new team, Hockey Milano Rossoblu.

In the first season in Serie A2, Adolf Insam, former coach of HCJ Milano Vipers, was appointed coach of the new franchise. He left to become technical director and was replaced by Murajca Pajic, his former deputy.

On 28 April 2010, the team announced that it has reached an agreement with Massimo Da Rin as new head coach for Hockey Milano for the 2010–11 season of Serie A2.

On 7 April 2012 Milano won the Serie A2 championship and was promoted to Serie A for the following season.

=== Partnership with the KHL ===
In 2011, Milano Rossoblu announced a partnership with the Kontinental Hockey League. According to a three-year plan, the aim for the 2011–12 season was to earn promotion to the Italian Serie A, which succeeded, while building up a team that would be able to play at KHL level. From the 2013–14 season on, one team was expected to join the KHL, while the other team would keep playing in Serie A (Elite.A). But the move was delayed due to a small arena, tight finances and the club being too underdeveloped.

=== Joining the AlpsHL ===
In July 2018 it was announced that Milano Rossoblu had joined the Alps Hockey League, replacing HC Neumarkt-Egna who withdrew due to financial difficulties. The team played 1 year in the Alps Hockey League, and later disbanded after the 2021-22 season from the Italian Hockey League.
