= ADI Design Museum =

Museum in Milan, Italy

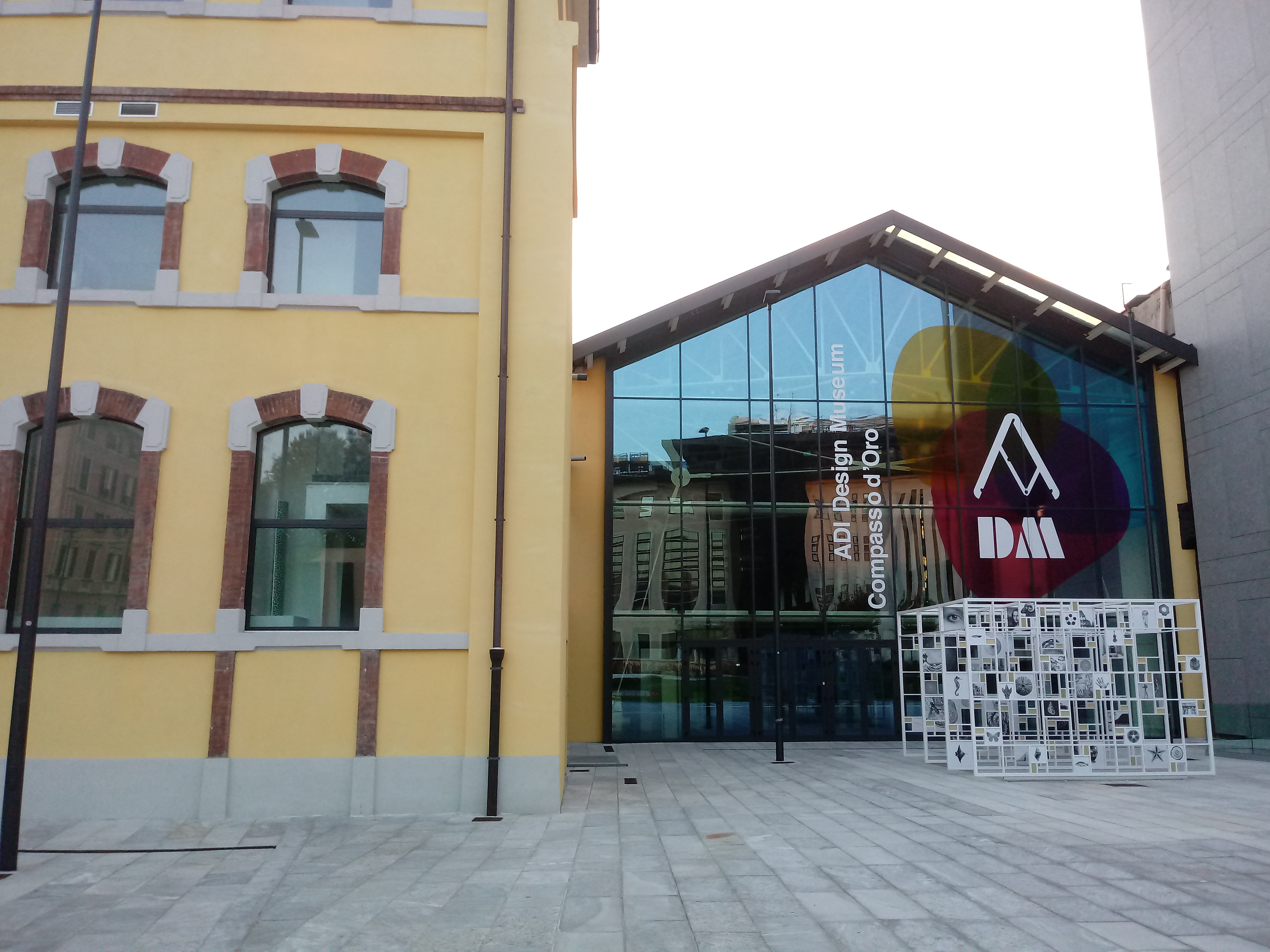
- Interactive fullscreen map
- Established: 2001
- Location: Milan, Italy
- Coordinates: 45°29′00″N 9°10′49″E
- Website: Official website

The ADI Design Museum is a museum in Milan, Italy, which houses the historical collection of the ADI Compasso d'Oro Foundation, as well as hosting temporary exhibitions, public talks and other initiatives. It is dedicated to the understanding and promotion of good design in Italy and abroad.

== History ==
The ADI Design Museum was established in 2001 in order to exhibit, promote, and conserve the collection of Compasso d'Oro winning designs and related archival material held by the Associazione per il Disegno Industriale (ADI) in Milan, Italy. The collection includes over 350 objects and works dating back to the inception of the Compasso d'Oro Award in 1954.

The museum has been located in a converted industrial building on Piazza Compasso d'Oro in the Porta Volta neighbourhood of Milan since 2021. It was designed by the architects Mara Servetto, Ico Migliore (Migliore + Servetto), with the designer Italo Lupi overseeing the curation of the historical collection. The focal point of the museum is the main gallery, a glass atrium that connects via Ceresio with via Bramante. The complex includes the adjacent palazzo and also houses the headquarters of the ADI, the museum conservatory and offices, a cafeteria, bookshop and meeting spaces. It is bordered by the Fabbrica del Vapore cultural centre, an arts exhibition and research facility designed by Herzog & de Meuron.

In 2004 the museum's Compasso d’Oro Historical Collection was classified by the Italian Ministry of Culture as an "asset of exceptional historical and artistic interest".

in 2025, Treccani published a comprehensive history of the Compasso d'Oro. The book is over 1,000 pages and includes 2275 images that document the museum's collection dating from its 1954 inception through 2022. It is published in both Italian and English versions.

== See also ==
- List of design museums
