= Mara Servetto =

Italian architect and designer

- Alma mater: Polytechnic University of Turin
- Occupation: Architect, designer
- Employer: Polytechnic University of Milan
- Awards: Compasso d'Oro

Margherita "Mara" Servetto (born 1957), is an Italian architect and designer. She is the co-founder of Migliore + Servetto Architects.

== Biography ==
She studied at the Polytechnic University of Turin, where she received her degree in architecture under the supervision of Achille Castiglioni. When Castiglioni obtained a teaching position at the Polytechnic University of Milan, she moved to Milan in order to collaborate with him, which she did until 1990.

In the early 1990s, she worked on research, architectural, and design projects alongside Ico Migliore. In 1992, she designed some objects for Alessi. In the meantime, she developed researches and trials on the use of fiberglass both in architecture and design. Moreover, together with Ico Migliore and Giovanna Piccinno, she began to produce “AA.VV. Autorivari” objects, which started to be distributed in Italy.

In 1997 she co-founded with her husband, Ico Migliore, Migliore + Servetto Architects, an architecture firm which creates, together with an international team of architects and designers, projects on various scales: from architecture to interior design; from urban design to temporary exhibitions; from museum to communication projects. These projects, diversified as they are, create innovative places that have a major impact on people. Architectures, interior and exhibition design projects characterized by an expressive use of light and new technologies.

She has been awarded many international prizes, such as the XXI (2008), XXIII (2014), XXV (2018) ADI Compasso d'Oro (Ita), five Honorable Mentions ADI Compasso d'Oro (Ita), eleven Red Dot Design Award (Ger), two German Design Award (Ger), two FX Interior Design Award (UK), the Annual Exhibit Design Award (Usa), two International Design Award (Usa) and the ASAL Exhibition Design of the Year (Ita).

Mara Servetto is visiting professor at Tokyo Joshibi University of Art and Design.

== Main works ==
=== Museums ===
- ADI Design Museum Compasso d'Oro, Milan (2021)

=== Exhibitions ===
- Achille Castiglioni and brothers. Master of Italian Design exhibition at Seoul Arts Centre, Seoul, South Korea (2020)
