= Agorà Ice Stadium =

Ice arena in Milan, Italy

- Stadio del Ghiaccio Agorà
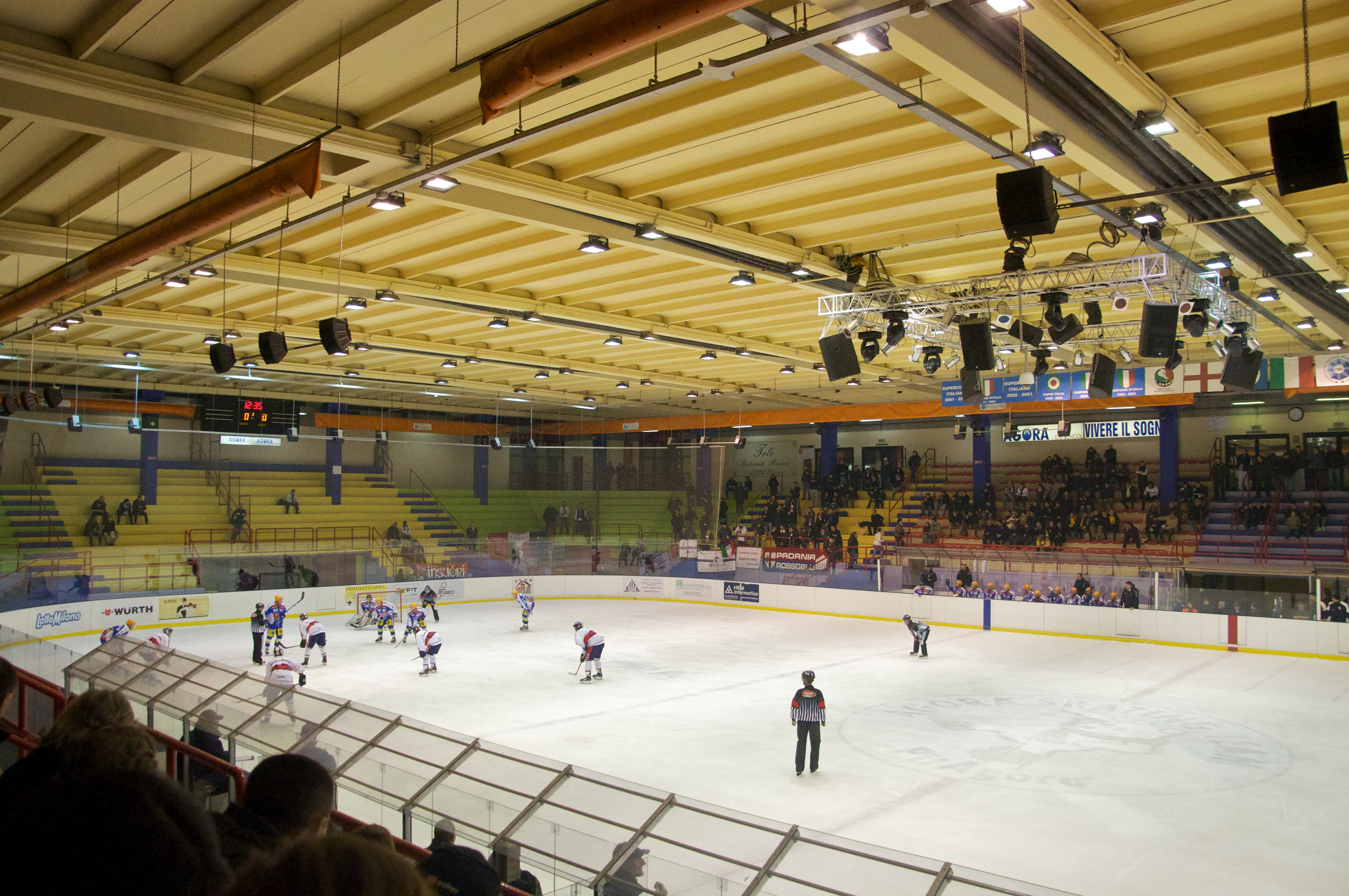
- Interactive map of Agorà Ice Stadium
- Location: Via dei Ciclamini 23, Milan, Italy
- Coordinates: 45°27′19.6″N 9°7′43.6″E
- Owner: Hockey Milano Rossoblu
- Capacity: Ice Hockey (4,000)

Construction
- Opened: 1987
- Closed: 2023

The Agorà Ice Stadium is an ice arena in Milan, Italy. Prior to its opening in 1987, Milan had had only one ice rink. It was the home of the Hockey Milano Rossoblu ice hockey team, and also hosts figure skating, speed skating, and synchronized skating. The stadium was closed in 2023.

The Agorà has a seating capacity of 4,000 and receives 150,000 to 200,000 visitors annually. It can host both national and international events. Its facilities include a standard track of 30 by 60 metres (98 ft × 197 ft) and a restaurant/bar.

The Agorà hosted the 2013 World Junior Figure Skating Championships.
