= Marco Oggian =

Italian designer, artist and illustrator

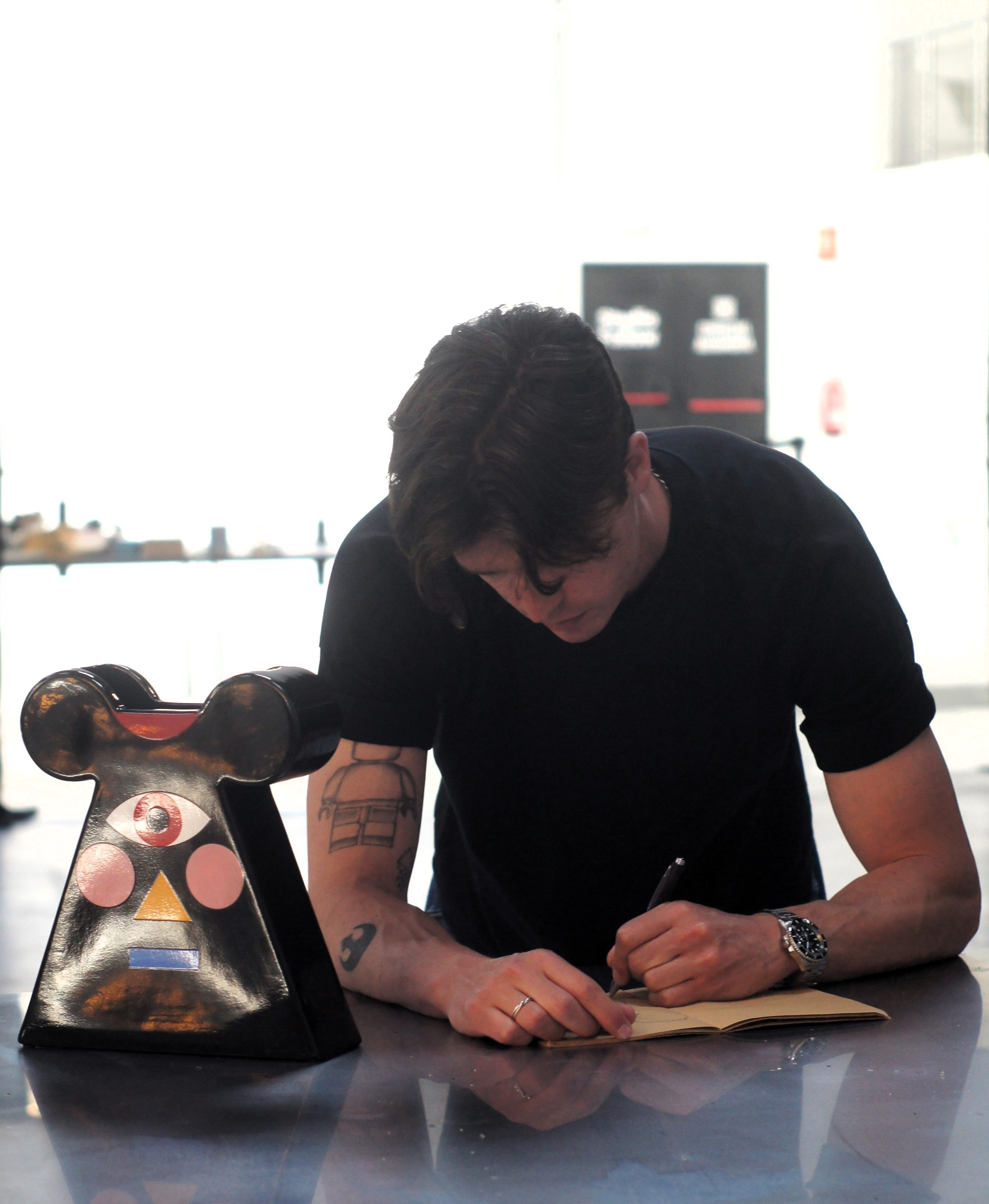
- Born: 23 March 1990 (age 36); Venice, Italy
- Known for: Designer; graphic artist
- Website: mrcggn.com; brutto.studio

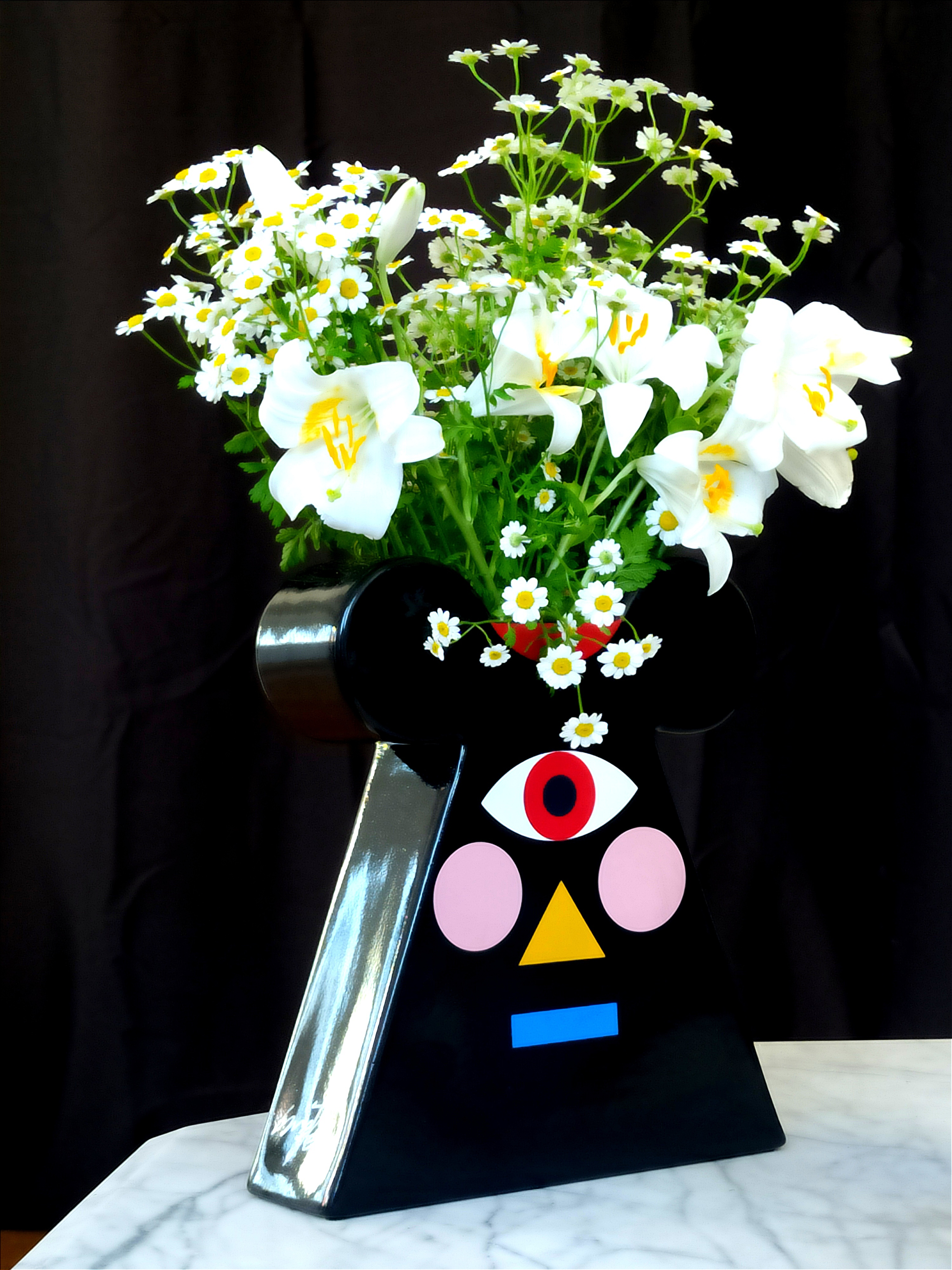
Vase Mr. Mouse

Marco Oggian (Venice, 23 March 1990) is an Italian designer, artist, and illustrator. He is known for simple geometric forms and vivid colours, often addressing social and critical themes.

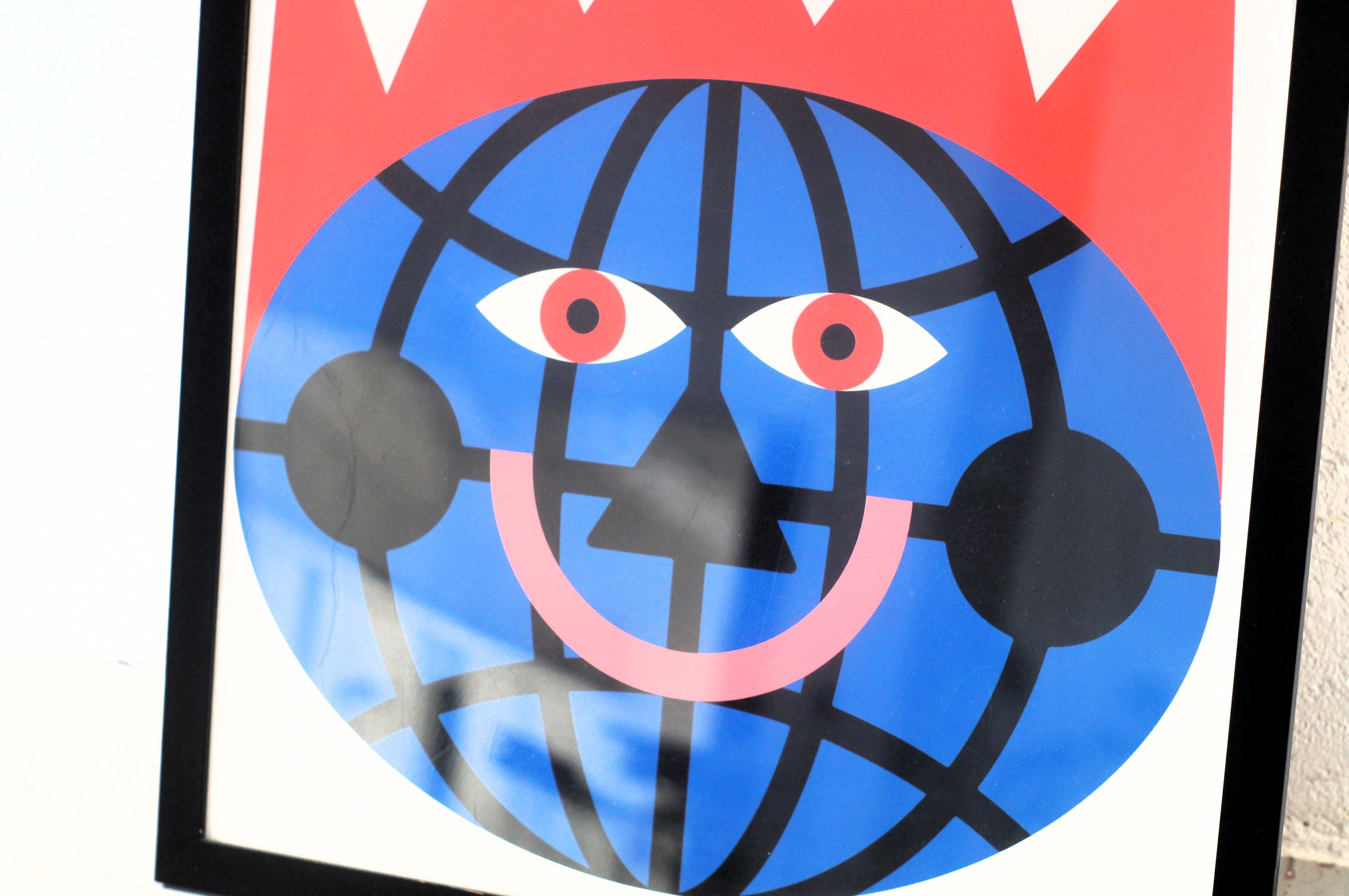
Fine Art Prints. Accept Reality

== Career ==
Throughout his career, Oggian has worked on international projects collaborating with brands such as Zara, Nike, Samsung, Campari Soda, Apple, Vogue, and North Sails. His work is characterised by bold colours, geometric shapes, and an ironic approach to social, controversial, and critical issues, including discrimination and racism.

Among his most notable projects are pieces for Qeeboo in collaboration with designer Stefano Giovannoni, the creative studio Brutto, and his partnerships with brands such as North Sails, for whom he designed a collection showcased at Milan Design Week. His work has been exhibited in galleries and museums in cities including Paris, Barcelona, Berlin, London, Milan, New York, Seoul, Turin, and Tokyo, and has appeared in over thirty books on design, branding, illustration, and typography.

He advocates a democratic vision of art and aspires to make his creations accessible to all.

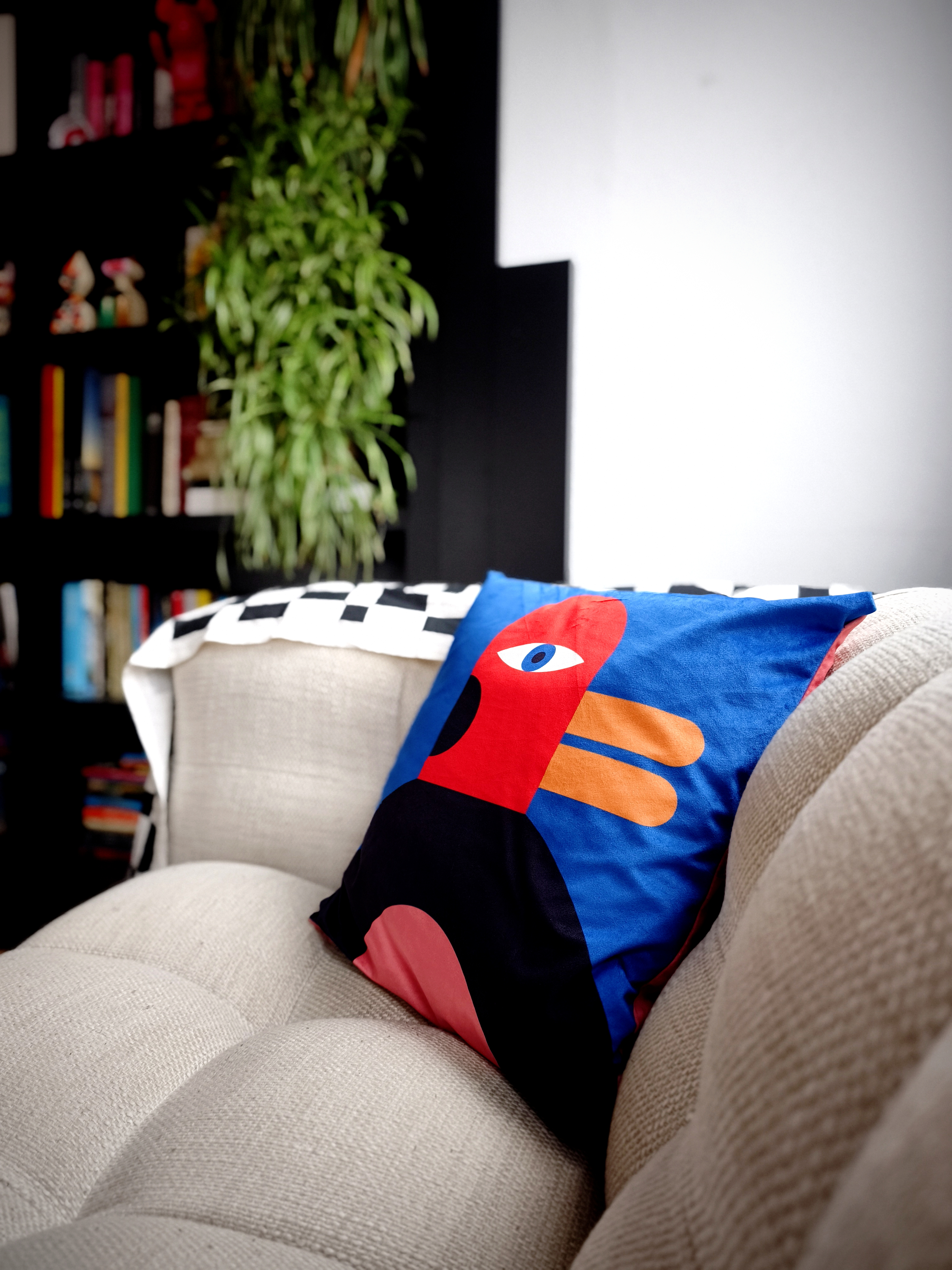
Duck cushion
