= Trix & Robert Haussmann =

Swiss architect and design duo

Trix & Robert Haussmann are an architect and designer duo based in Zürich, Switzerland. Together they founded the General Design institute (Allgemeine Entwurfsanstalt) in 1967.

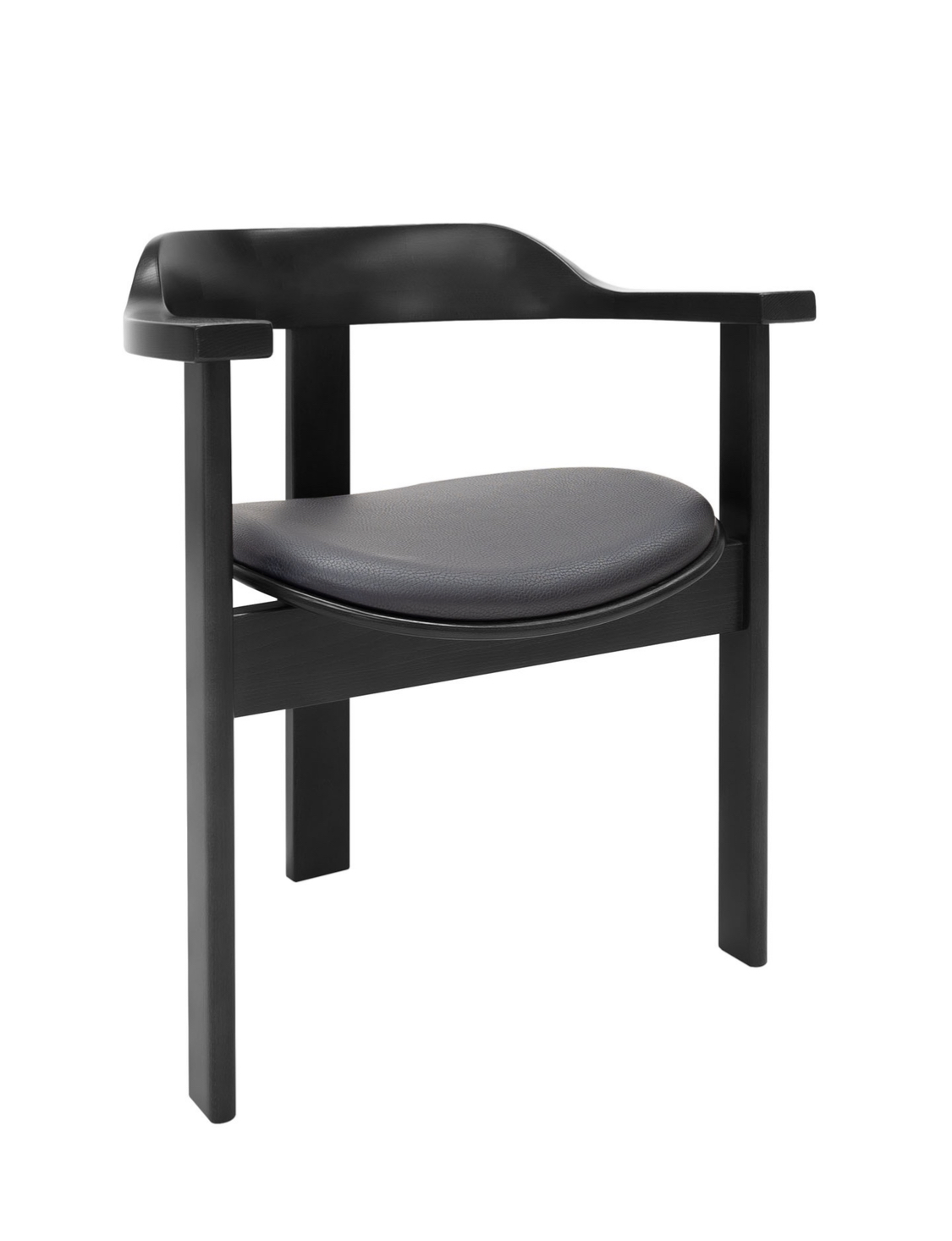
Expo Chair by Trix and Robert Haussmann, 1964, for Dietiker

== Background and influences ==
Both architects have strong roots in modern architecture. Robert Haussman (1931) studied under Gerrit Rietveld in Amsterdam, and later, in Zürich, with the Swiss designer Willy Guhl and Bauhaus member Johannes Itten. He was a professor of architecture at the State Academy of Fine Arts in Stuttgart until 1996. Trix Högl (1933) completed her architectural studies at the ETH Zurich under Werner Max Moser and Jacques Schader. She was an associate professor for architecture at the ETH Zürich until 2002.

== Exhibitions ==
Since founding their General Design Institute in 1967, they have had numerous solo exhibitions, including shows at the KW Institute for Contemporary Art, Berlin, Museum für Gestaltung, Zürich, and Kunsthaus Bregenz, Austria and Nottingham Contemporary in the UK. In 2011, they were included in the V&A exhibition, Postmodernism: Style and Subversion 1970–1990, that toured from London to Zurich. Their work is held in the public collection of the Museum of Design, Zurich.

In 2013, the Swiss Federal Office of Culture awarded Trix and Robert Haussmann the Grand Prix Design.

== Selected projects ==
Together Trix & Robert Haussmann have collaborated on numerous architectural and design projects, including the Da Capo Bar, Hauptbahnhof, Zürich, (1979–80), Shopville, Hauptbahnhof, Zurich, CH, Boutique Weinberg, Zurich CH, Boutique Courrèges, Zurich, CH, Kronenhalle Bar, Zurich, CH, Gewerbebank Baden, Baden, CH, Galleria Hamburg, Hamburg, DE and Hotel Plaza, Basel, CH.
