= Italo Lupi =

Italian graphic designer (1957–2023)

- Born: 28 March 1934; Cagliari, Italy
- Died: 27 June 2023 (aged 89); Milan, Italy
- Occupation: Writer

Italo Lupi (28 March 1934 – 27 June 2023) was an Italian graphic designer and writer.

== Life and career ==
Lupi was born in Cagliari in 1934. He studied architecture at Polytechnic University of Milan and graduated in 1959. After briefly serving as an assistant to professor Pier Giacomo Castiglioni at his alma mater, he started his career as a graphic designer at the La Rinascente Development Office, under the direction of Mario Bellini. After working in the studio of Achille and Pier Giacomo Castiglioni, he opened his own studio, and started collaborating as an art director with major companies and institutions, including IBM and the Triennale di Milano.

During his career he designed numerous logos, including for Fiorucci, Miu Miu, Cinelli, the 1983-2019 logo of the Triennale di Milano, the FIS Alpine World Ski Championships 2021, the Museo Poldi Pezzoli and the ADI Design Museum. His last assignment was as image curator of Palazzo Butera in Palermo.

Lupi also collaborated as art director and columnist with numerous architecture and design magazines, notably Zodiac (1970-3), Shop (1971-2), Abitare (1974-85) and Domus (1986-92). Between 1992 and 2007 he served as editor-in-chief of Abitare.

During his career Lupi was the recipient of numerous awards and accolades, including two Compasso d'Oro, a German Design Award, a bronze medal at the 2012 International Design Awards, the title of Royal Designer for Industry. He died in Milan on 27 June 2023, at the age of 89.
