= Domus (magazine) =

Italian architecture and design magazine

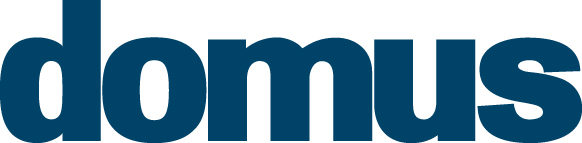
- Editor: Nicola Di Battista
- Categories: Architecture and design
- Frequency: Monthly
- Circulation: c. 51,000
- Publisher: Editoriale Domus
- Founder: Gio Ponti
- Founded: 1928
- Based in: Rozzano, Milan, Italy
- Language: English, Italian
- Website: domusweb.it/en
- ISSN: 0012-5377

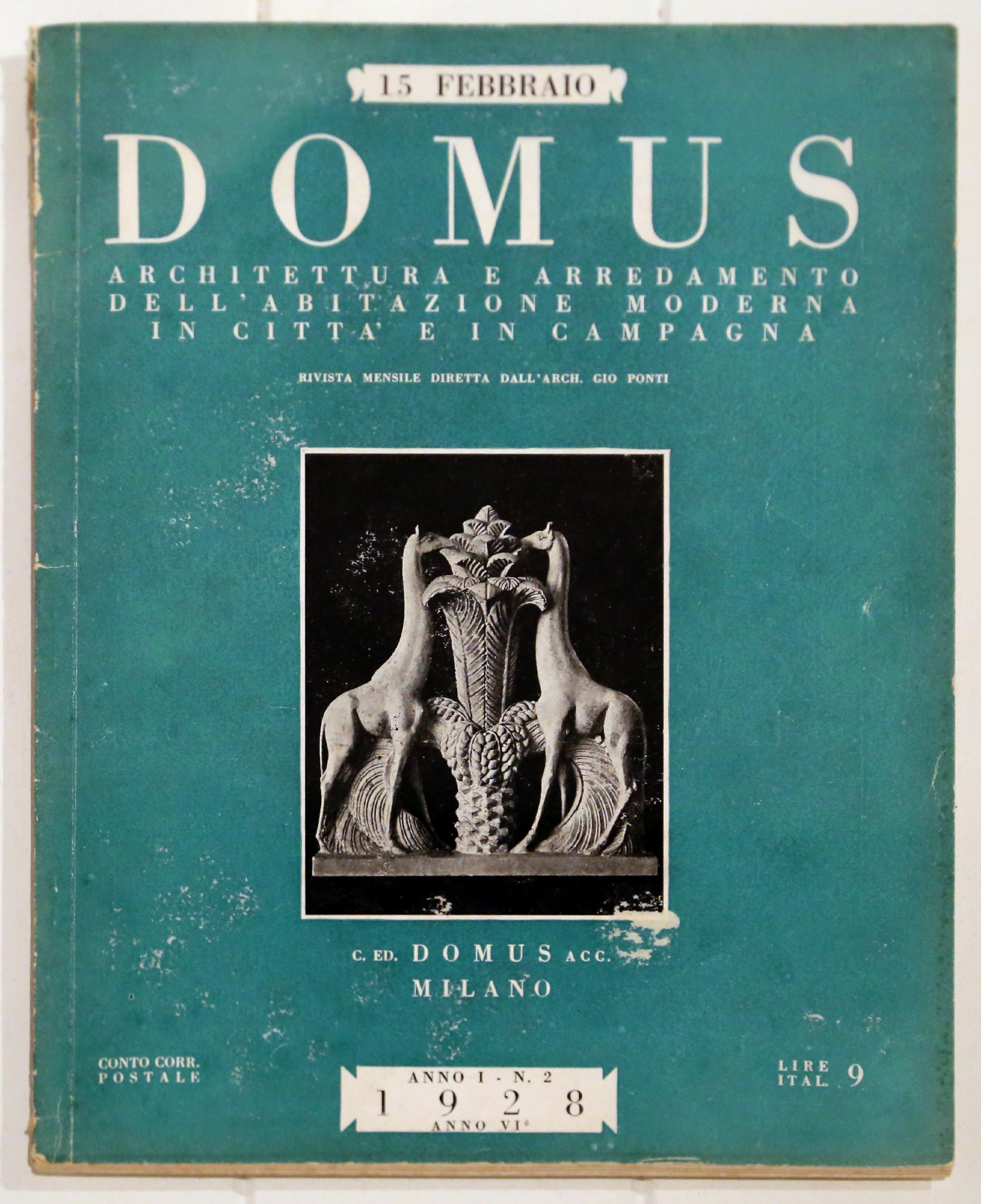
Early edition of the magazine ANNO 1 - No. 2 (February 1928)

Domus is an architecture and design magazine founded in 1928 by architect Gio Ponti and Barnabite father Giovanni Semeria. Published by Editoriale Domus, the magazine is issued 11 times a year on a monthly basis and has its headquarters in Rozzano, Milan.

== History ==
=== Foundation – WWII ===
The first issue of Domus, subtitled "Architecture and decor of the modern home in the city and in the country," was published on 15 January 1928. Its mission was to renew architecture, interiors and Italian decorative arts without overlooking topics of interest to women, like the art of homemaking, gardening and cooking. Gio Ponti was the founder of the magazine and delineated the magazine's goals in his editorials, insisting on the importance of aesthetics and style in the field of industrial production.

Gianni Mazzocchi, a, 23-year-old publisher who had moved to Milan from the Marche region, purchased Domus on 11 July 1929 and founded Editoriale Domus, which today publishes numerous magazines (Quattroruote, Meridiani, Tuttotrasporti, Il cucchiaio d'argento, etc.).

Gio Ponti left the magazine after twelve years as editor; starting in July 1941, Domus came under the direction of Massimo Bontempelli, Giuseppe Pagano and Melchiorre Bega. In October 1942, Guglielmo Ulrich took over Giuseppe Pagano's role (who, because of his involvement in antifascist politics, died on 22 April 1945 at the Mauthausen concentration camp). Melchiorre Bega became editor in October 1943. The war years required continuous changes in the magazine's direction and its printing operations were forced to move to Bergamo. Domus was published monthly throughout 1944, but was suspended in 1945.

=== The postwar period ===
Publication resumed in January 1946 with issue 205. Domus was now directed by Ernesto Nathan Rogers (from the firm, BBPR) with a new look, but affirming a line of cultural continuity with Ponti's period as editor. These were years of innovation when the magazine embraced new cultural trends and sought out the collaboration of intellectuals like Elio Vittorini and Alberto Moravia. During that same year, Editoriale Domus bought Casabella, entrusting its direction first to Franco Albini and Giancarlo Palanti and then to Ernesto Nathan Rogers (from December 1953); Casabella was sold in 1964.

In 1948, Gio Ponti returned as editor of Domus which had become a bi-monthly; in 1951, the magazine resumed publication on a monthly basis. The 1950s and '60s were marked by great vitality in architecture, the arts and design. Domus promoted everything that was new on the scene and its authors, becoming a key reference for the international debate among various artistic trends. In 1968, the magazine celebrated its 40th anniversary with issue 459 and in July 1971, the magazine published its 500th issue.

Gio Ponti was joined by Cesare Casati as managing editor in July 1976. The era was characterized by such features as Ettore Sottsass' travel diary, "Memoires di panna montata (Whipped Cream Memoires)" and Pierre Restany's "Letters" to the art world. The magazine went international with its translation into English and French until defining its current bilingual (Italian/English) format. In December 1978, Domus celebrated its 50th anniversary with an exhibition at Palazzo delle Stelline in Milan.

=== 1980s postmodernism ===
Alessandro Mendini became editor in July 1979 (Gio Ponti died in October 1979). A leading figure in post-modern design, Mendini opened Domus to the neo avant-garde. Beginning in January 1980, Ettore Sottsass took over the magazine's graphic design. In 1982, Maria Grazia Mazzocchi, Valerio Castelli, Alessandro Guerriero and Editoriale Domus founded Domus Academy, a school for designers and product design managers directed by Andrea Branzi.

Publisher Gianni Mazzocchi died on 24 October 1984, and his daughter, Giovanna Mazzocchi Bordone, took over the direction of Editoriale Domus. In 1985, Lisa Licitra Ponti became editor pro-tempore and, with the March 1986 issue, Mario Bellini became editor, engaging Italo Lupi for the new graphic design project. Domus accentuated its international calling: from 1988 to 1990, six issues included a Russian language version; a Chinese language version has been published since 1989. Bellini's term as editor ended in 1991.

=== From the 1990s to the present ===
Vittorio Magnago Lampugnani became editor in January 1992, flanked by graphic designer Alan Fletcher beginning in January 1994. Released in more than 100 countries across the globe, the magazine was now entirely bilingual.

From February 1996 to July 2000, Domus was directed by François Burkhardt, a Swiss citizen at the helm of an international editorial team for the first time in Domus' history. The magazine expanded its interests beyond the traditional disciplines of architecture, industrial design and art to the field of communications.

To celebrate its 70th anniversary in 1998, Robert Wilson created the play 70 Angels on the Façade performed at the Nuovo Piccolo Teatro in Milan. Deyan Sudjic took over as editor from François Burkhardt in August 2000 publishing his first issue in September of the same year. Simon Esterson's graphic design responded to strict requirements of linearity, simplicity and ease of reading. The editorial structure was organized into three main sections, giving more space to opinions and analysis supporting the features, with the intention of broadening the magazine's horizons to new fields of interest like car design and fashion.

Stefano Boeri was editor from January 2004 to April 2007 when Domus was characterized by interest in large architectural projects and new design frontiers, but also by its focus on some important geopolitical issues, among which the recent geo-design: the geopolitical aspects of design – how, where and why complex objects are designed today.

In 2006, the publisher decided to entrust an annual special, "Domus copyright," to a renowned international architect: Dutch architect Rem Koolhaas opened the initiative.

That same year, the German house, Taschen, published Domus 1928–1999, a monumental historical anthology of the magazine in 12 volumes. Flavio Albanese became editor in May 2007. With his new direction, Domus reinforced the presence of built architecture and city design, focusing on the discovery of new and young international talents, continuing its investigation into the relationship between multiple art forms. In 2008, the magazine celebrated 80 years of uninterrupted publication with a special issue revisiting Gio Ponti's work through original works produced by internationally renowned artists, shown at an exhibition during the Salone del Mobile in Milan.

In April 2010, Alessandro Mendini returned as editor of Domus whose subtitle, "The new utopia," was a response to the current crisis: "The history of grand transformations in architecture and design is marked by the new utopias, and it is our intention to pursue this opening line. To scour the world in search of projects that demonstrate scenarios and attitudes of living that represent a positive way of looking to the future. Not so much new utopias of a technical nature, but rather humanistic and psychological: the ecology of exterior environments is preceded by that of interiors. In this sense the new Domus re-establishes its links with its origins as a 'Magazine for the home', offering examples of the dignity of living the city, objects and the home. The new design of the magazine will also evoke memories of the Domus of the past through the classic, radiant sequencing of its articles and images." The issues published under Mendini's direction were distinguished by cover portraits drawn by Lorenzo Mattotti.

At the same time, Joseph Grima began his role as the magazine's new editor. He was mandated with two tasks: to create Domus Web whose graphic design was entrusted to Dan Hill, which went online on December 9, 2010 and to edit the paper version with graphics by Salottobuono. The April 2011 (issue 946) was the first issue published under Grima's direction. His co-editors were Marcello Minerbi and Roberto Zancan. According to publisher Giovanna Mazzocchi Bordone, Joseph Grima had the task of transforming Domus [10 ] : [...] "The magazine must delve more deeply, provide interpretive readings. The rest – trends, news, experiments – should showcase on all the platforms that today's technology allows us to use."

The semi-native iPad edition was launched in September 2012 (issues 961 – 974). The Domus app was designed by Domus creative director Marco Ferrari, with the collaboration of interaction designers Manuel Erhenfeld and Dan Hill, the app was Merit Winner at the 48th SPD Annual Awards in the App of the Year and Best News App categories. In September 2013, Joseph Grima handed the editorship over to Nicola Di Battista, deputy editor of the magazine in the 1990s, supported by a College of Masters (David Chipperfield, Kenneth Frampton, Hans Kollhoff, Werner Oechslin and Eduardo Souto de Moura) and a Study Center, comprising a team of young professionals. Di Battista's goal is to place people at the center of contemporary architecture.

== Contents ==
Founded to circulate ideas regarding style in homemaking and furnishing, over the years Domus—through its various editors—has explored a wide range of nuances in the fields of architecture, the applied arts, industrial design, art, urban planning, editorial and advertising graphics, digital communications, always with an international perspective.

== Editors ==
- 15 January 1928: Gio Ponti
- July 1941: Massimo Bontempelli, Giuseppe Pagano and Melchiorre Bega
- October 1942: Massimo Bontempelli, Guglielmo Ulrich and Melchiorre Bega
- October 1943 – December 1944: Melchiorre Bega
- 1945: publication ceased due to the war
- January 1946 (issue 205): Ernesto Nathan Rogers
- January 1948: Gio Ponti
- July 1976: Gio Ponti and Cesare Casati
- July 1979: Alessandro Mendini
- January 1985: Lisa Licitra Ponti
- March 1986: Mario Bellini
- January 1992: Vittorio Magnago Lampugnani
- February 1996: François Burkhardt
- September 2000: Deyan Sudjic
- January 2004 (issue 866): Stefano Boeri
- May 2007 (issue 903): Flavio Albanese
- April 2010 (issue 935): Alessandro Mendini
- April 2011 (issue 946): Joseph Grima
- September 2013 (issue 972): Nicola Di Battista
- January 2018 (issue 1020): Michele De Lucchi

== Local versions ==
- China (2006)
- Israel (2009)
- India (2011)
- Mexico (2011)
- América Central y el Caribe (2011)
- German version for Germany, Austria and Switzerland (8 May 2013)
- S. Korea (2018)

== Website history ==
www.domusweb.it in Italian and English went on line in September 2000 with graphic design by Deepend. At the same, Domusxchange, designed as a B2B trading partner of the main site and as a content vehicle, was presented. From the late spring of the following year, graphic design was moved in-house to the editorial offices in order to develop a simpler and friendlier interface suitable for an information site. That same year, former editor Deyan Sudjic took over website direction. Since then, graphic design has been produced in-house, varying at each change of editorship (with the exception of Mendini). Albanese and Grima were the only editors to entrust the website to outside designers: Dan Hill. All editors have shared the intent of promoting autonomous content with respect to the paper version, but at the same time hosting a certain amount of magazine content. Since 2007, the website has been enriched with a video section with special videos produced by both Domus and other subjects during special events like the Salone del Mobile.

== Archives ==
The cataloguing of over 180,000 photographic documents was completed in 2013. The Domus archives consist of published and unpublished documents ranging from correspondence between important figures to entire photographic reports, organized in different sections according to the nature and origin of the archival materials.

== See also ==
- List of magazines in Italy

== Bibliography ==
- Juliette Caputo, "Domus: 45 ans d'architecture, design, art", Domus, Milan, 1973.
- Giancarlo De Carlo, "Scritti per Domus", Domus, Rozzano, 2005.
- Charlotte & Peter Fiell (ed) Domus 1928 – 1999, Taschen, Koln 2006, 12 volumi + 1 CD–Rom.
