= Willy Guhl =

Swiss artist, architect and designer (1915–2004)

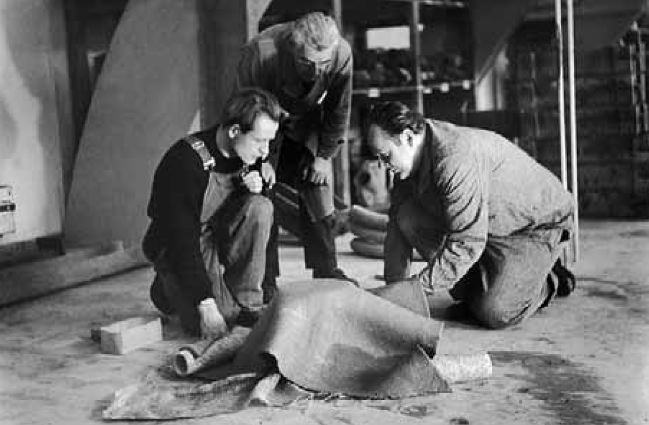
- Guhl (left) with Robert Haussmann at Eternit SA in Niederurnen, 1951
- Born: 6 July 1915; Stein am Rhein
- Died: 4 October 2004 (aged 89); Hemishofen
- Occupations: Artist, architect, designer

Willy Guhl (6 July 1915 – 4 October 2004) was a Swiss industrial designer, furniture designer, and interior designer.

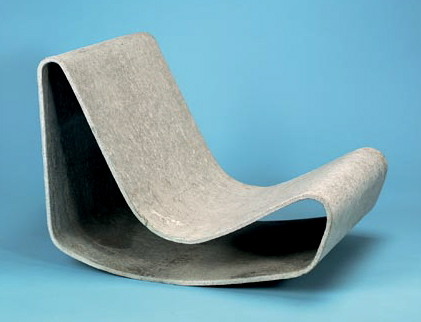
Willy Guhl's beach chair (Loop Chair prototype) in fibre-cement, 1954

== Life and career ==
Guhl was born on 6 July 1915 in Stein am Rhein. He completed an apprenticeship as a furniture joiner from 1930 to 1933. Awarded a scholarship for his outstanding results, he went on to study from 1933 to 1938 at the Kunstgewerbeschule Zürich in the class of Wilhelm Kienzle. In 1939 he founded his own studio in Zürich.

From 1941 to 1980 Guhl taught at the Kunstgewerbeschule Zürich, becoming its director in 1951. From 1971 he developed the school's product design specialisation class, one of the few such programmes in Switzerland at the time.

In 1943 he co-founded the Vereinigung Schweizer Innenarchitekten (VSI), the Association of Swiss Interior Designers, and in 1966 the Verband Schweizer Industrial Designer (SID), the Association of Swiss Industrial Designers.

His sustained interest in industrial production and new manufacturing methods brought him into close collaboration with industry, notably Eternit (Schweiz) AG, furniture manufacturer Dietiker + Co, and agricultural machinery maker AEBI. A significant representative of Swiss Neo-Functionalism, Guhl became internationally known above all for his Loop Chair — a lounge chair formed from a single continuous strip of fibre-cement Eternit — designed in 1954 and awarded the Die Gute Form prize in 1955. Guhl redesigned the chair in 1998 to remove asbestos from the original material; it remains in production today.

Guhl died on 6 October 2004 in Stein am Rhein.

== Selected exhibitions ==
- 1985: Willy Guhl — Gestalter und Lehrer (Designer and Teacher), Museum für Gestaltung Zürich
- 2022: Willy Guhl — Denken mit den Händen (Thinking with the Hands), Museum für Gestaltung Zürich

== Selected bibliography ==
- Renate Menzi and Museum für Gestaltung Zürich (eds.): Willy Guhl — Denken mit den Händen. Lars Müller Publishers, Zürich, 2023. ISBN 978-3-03778-714-4
- Lotte Schilder Bär: "Willy Guhl". In: Isabelle Rucki and Dorothee Huber (eds.): Architektenlexikon der Schweiz — 19./20. Jahrhundert. Birkhäuser, Basel, 1998, p. 234. ISBN 3-7643-5261-2
- Andrea Weibel: "Willy Guhl". In: Historisches Lexikon der Schweiz, 16 March 2006.
