= Andrea Branzi =

Italian architect and designer (1938–2023)

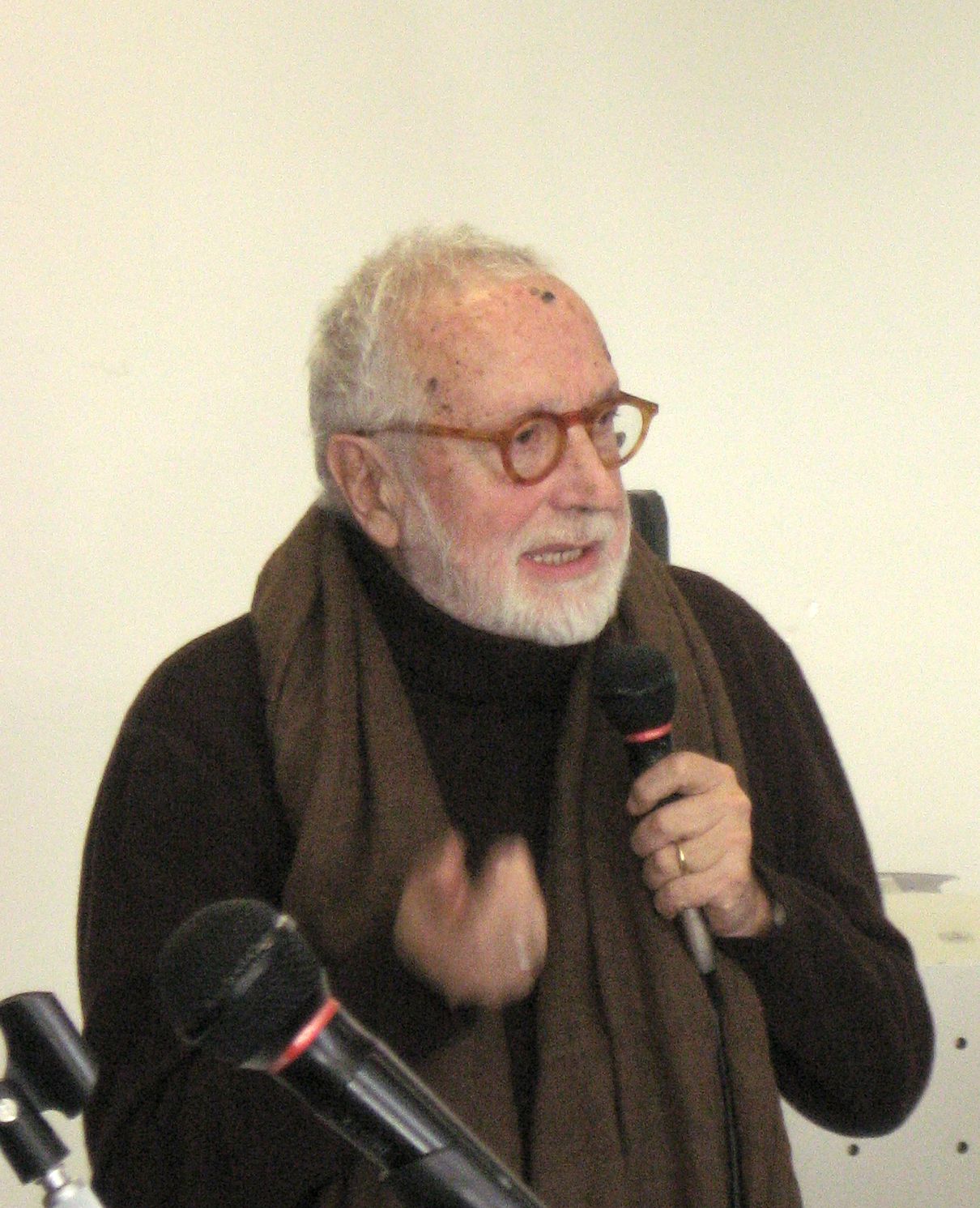
- Andrea Branzi at the opening of the Domus Academy academic year (2008)
- Born: 30 November 1938; Florence (Kingdom of Italy)
- Died: 9 October 2023 (aged 84); Milan
- Occupation: Architect, designer, university teacher
- Employer: Cor Unum
- Awards: honorary Royal Designer for Industry (2008)
- Website: www.andreabranzi.it

Andrea Branzi (30 November 1938 – 9 October 2023) was an Italian architect, designer, and academic. He was born and raised in Florence, though he lived and worked in Milan for much of his career. He was a professor and chairman of the School of Interior Design at the Polytechnic University of Milan until 2009.

== Life and career ==
Branzi studied as an architect at the Florence School of Architecture. He received his degree in 1966, then founded Archizoom Associati with Gilberto Corretti, Paolo Deganello, Massimo Morozzi in 1966 in Florence where they developed the No-Stop City. In 1976, he established Studio Alchimia and in the 1980s began to associate with the Memphis Group.

Branzi also served as the cultural director of Domus Academy, Italy’s first postgraduate design school, founded in 1982, for its first ten years. His design works are included in permanent collections of museums such as the Centre Georges Pompidou, Paris; the Metropolitan Museum of Art, New York; Museum of Fine Arts Houston, Houston; Museum of Modern Art, New York; Victoria & Albert Museum, London; Vitra Design Museum, Weil am Rhein, and the ADI Design Museum in Milan.

Branzi died on 9 October 2023, at the age of 84.

== Awards and honors ==
In 1979, Andrea Branzi was awarded the prestigious Italian industrial design award Compasso d'Oro.

In 2005, Branzi received his second Compasso d'Oro Award.

In 2008, he was named an Honorary Royal Designer for Industry by the Royal Society for the encouragement of Arts, Manufactures and Commerce (RSA) in the UK.

On 15 October 2018, he was awarded the Rolf Schock Prizes by the Royal Swedish Academy of Fine Arts.
