= Studio Alchimia =

Italian post-radical design group

Studio Alchimia was a post-radical avant-garde group founded in Milan in 1976 by Alessandro Guerriero and his sister Adriana with the stated mission of "materializing a non-existent thing into being."

== History ==
Studio Alchimia was an interdisciplinary and multiform group whose activities included seminars, production of experimental video, clothing design, theatrical set design, product design, decorative arts, performance art, and architecture. Alchimia presented their first group of furniture in the exhibition "Bau.Haus uno" in 1978. "Bau.Haus uno" included work by Ettore Sottsass Jr., Alessandro Mendini, Andrea Branzi, Trix & Robert Haussmann, U.F.O., Michele De Lucchi and Paola Navone. Alchimia's 1980 exhibition "Bau.Haus due" included textile work by Daniela Puppa.

Studio Alchimia's core membership included the designers Alessandro Guerriero, Alessandro Mendini, Bruno Gregori Giorgio Gregori, Arturo Reboldi, Pier Carlo Bontempi and Carla Ceccariglia. The Studio was organized by Adriana Guerriero-Reali, Tina Corti and Donatella Biffi. On the website Alchimia Milano you can find a list of all people who worked at or with Alchimia.

== Exhibitions ==
Studio Alchimia exhibited their work at the Milan Triennial, The Musée d'Art Moderne de la Ville de Paris, Galleria d'Arte Moderna, Milan, and the 1980 Venice Biennale. In 2011 their work was featured in the "Postmodernism: Style and Subversion 1970-1990" exhibition at the Victoria and Albert Museum in London.

== Awards ==
Studio Alchimia was awarded the Compasso d'Oro in the Design Studio category in 1981 for design research
