= Alessandro Mendini =

Italian designer and architect (1931–2019)

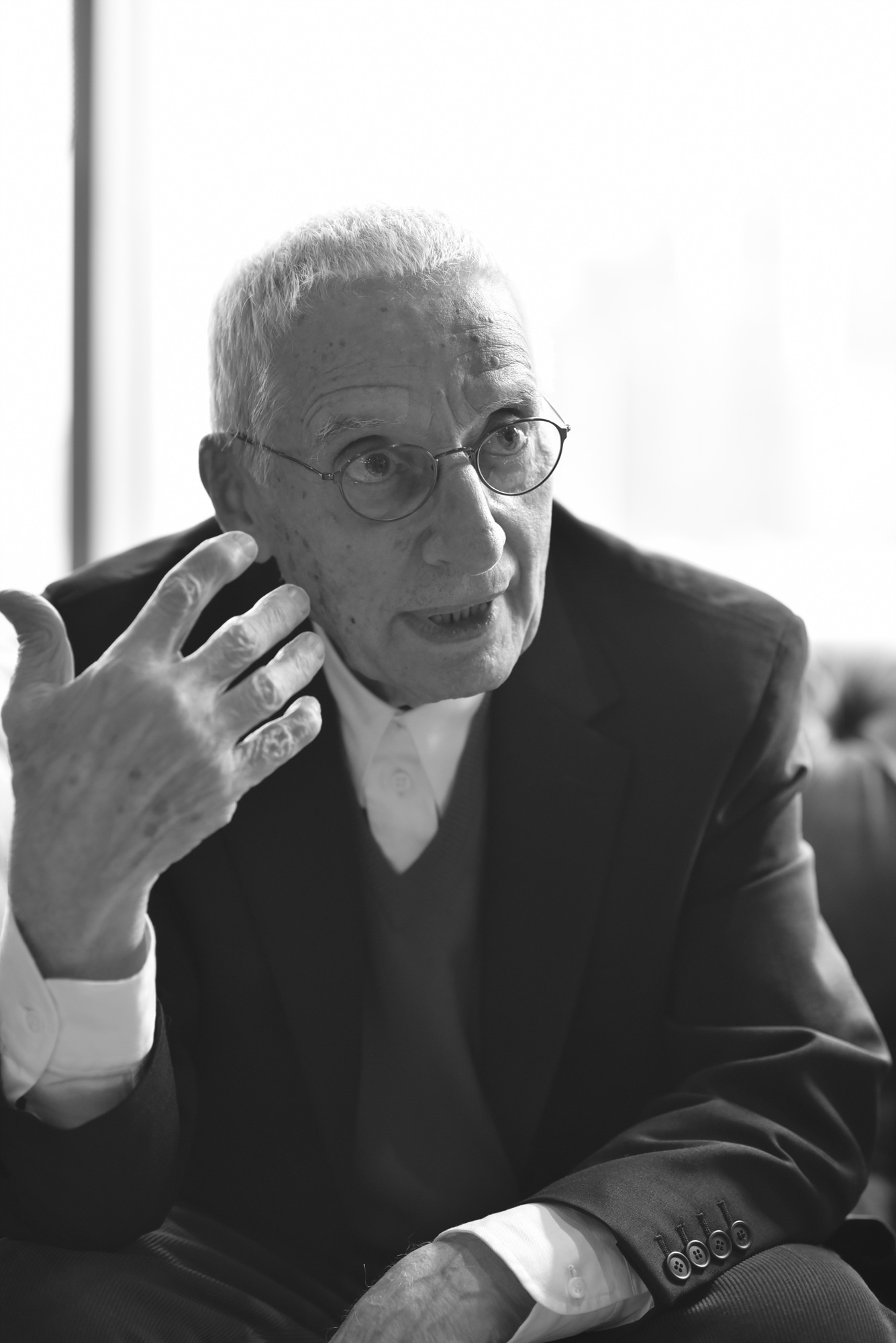
- Born: 16 August 1931; Milan
- Died: 18 February 2019 (aged 87); Milan
- Occupations: Architect, designer, editing staff, visual artist, photographer
- Awards: honorary doctor of the École normale supérieure de Cachan (2011)

Alessandro Mendini (16 August 1931 – 18 February 2019) was an Italian designer and architect. He played an important part in the development of Italian, Postmodern, and Radical design. He also worked, aside from his artistic career, for Casabella, Modo and Domus magazines.

The character of his design is marked by what was his strong interest in mixing different cultures and different forms of expression; he created graphics, furniture, interiors, paintings and architecture and also wrote several articles and books. He was renowned as an enthusiastic member of jury in architectural competitions for young designers. He taught at the University of Milan.

Mendini was born in Milan. He graduated from Politecnico di Milano in 1959 with a degree in architecture and worked as a designer with Marcello Nizzoli. He was the editor-in-chief of Domus magazine from 1979 to 1985 and changed the landscape of modern design through his quintessential works of postmodernism, such as the Proust Armchair and the Groninger Museum. Just as works of the Renaissance period expressed human values and sensibilities, Mendini contributed to bringing into the heart of design those “values” and “sensibilities” that have been eclipsed by commercialism and functionalism. He collaborated with companies such as Cartier, Gufram, Hermès, Vacheron Constantin, Swarovski, Venini, and Supreme, Alessi, Philips, Swatch, Roche Bobois, Tucano, and Louis Vuitton.

From 1989 up until his death in Milan in 2019 he ran his own practice in Milan, the Atelier Mendini, together with his younger brother Francesco Mendini (b. 1939). In 2022, he was inducted into the 2022 Milan Hall of Fame.

== Career ==
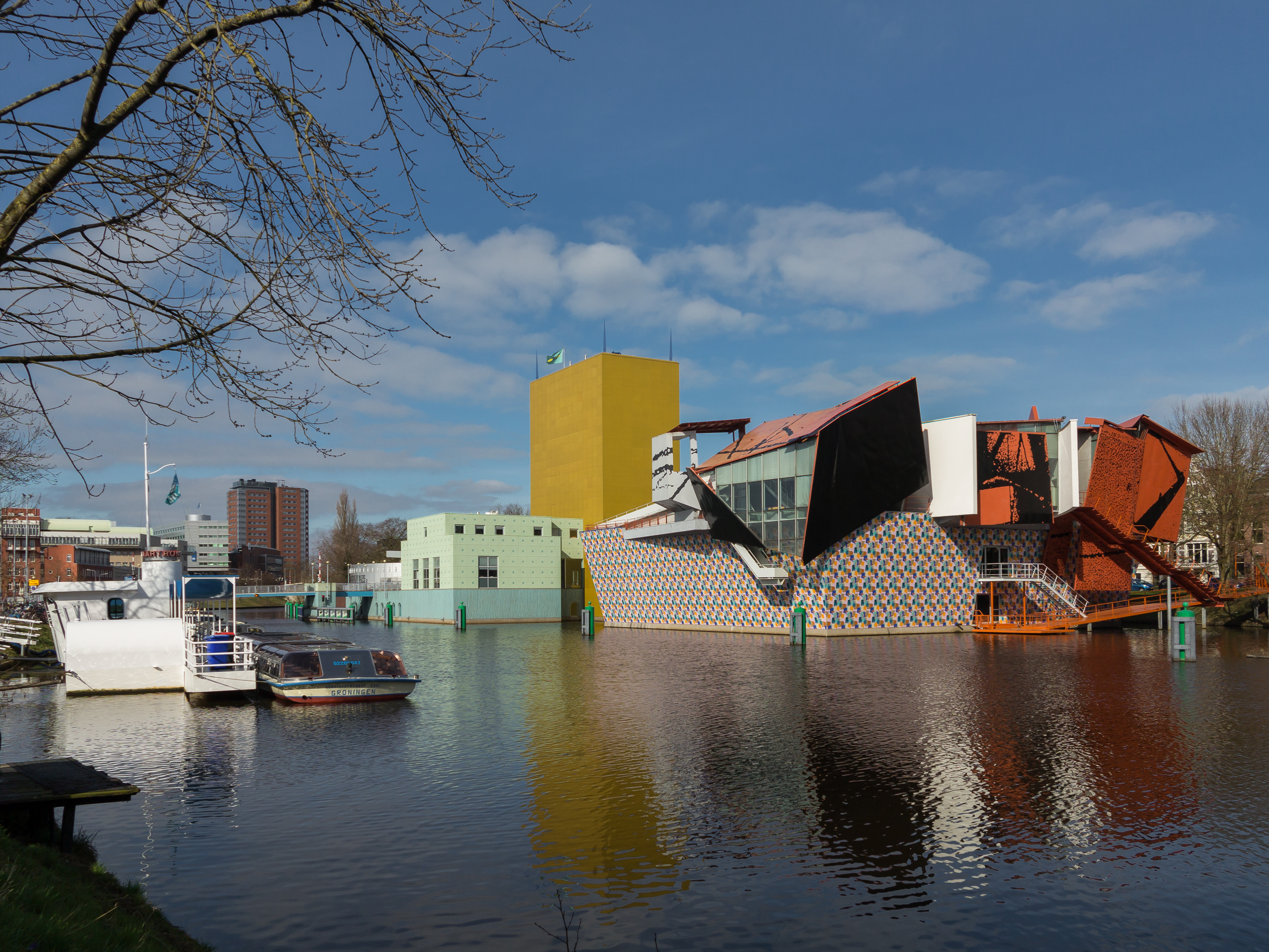
Groninger museum 1989

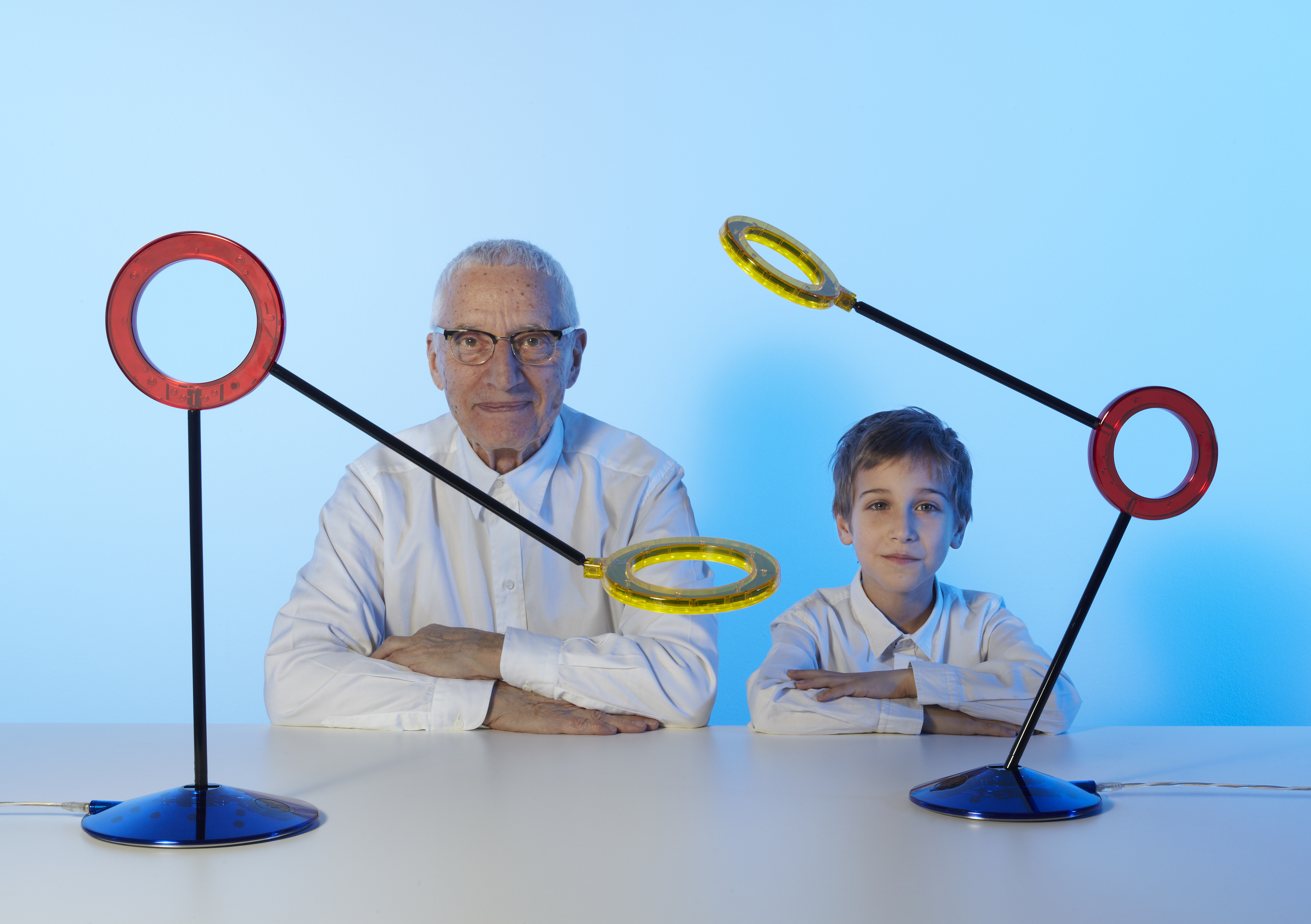
RAMUN amuleto 2010

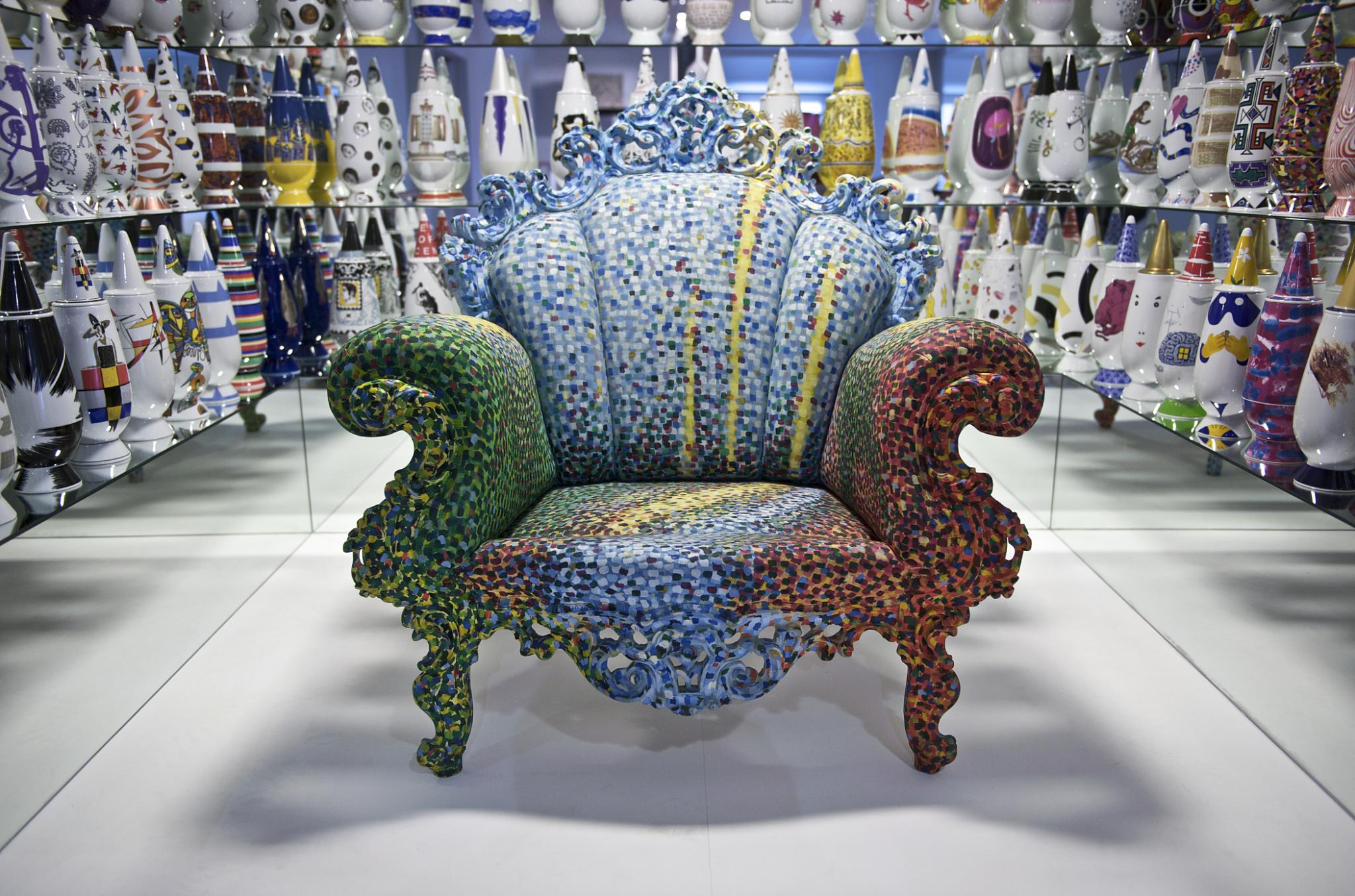
Proust armchair 1978

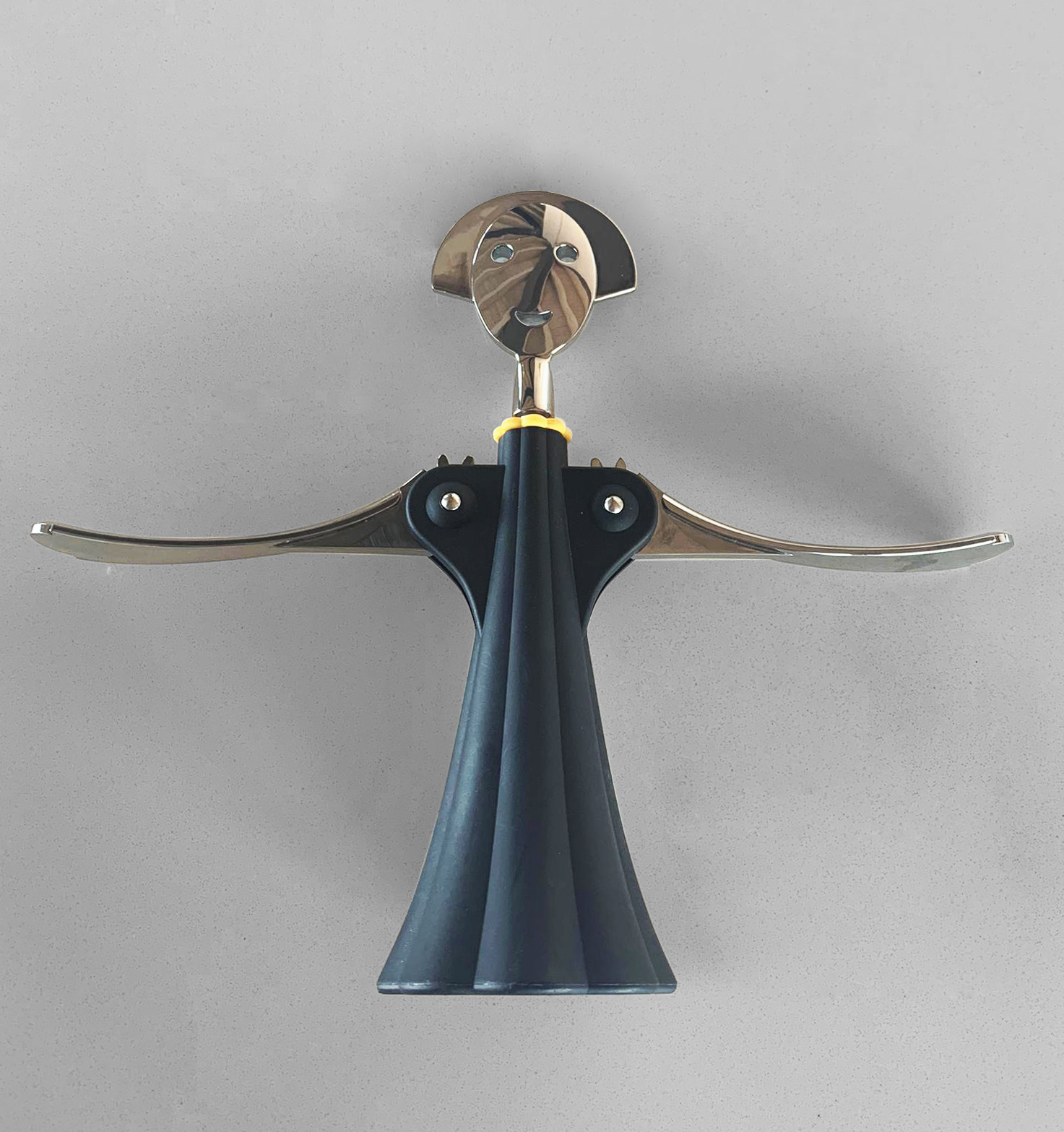
Alessi Anna G. corkscrew

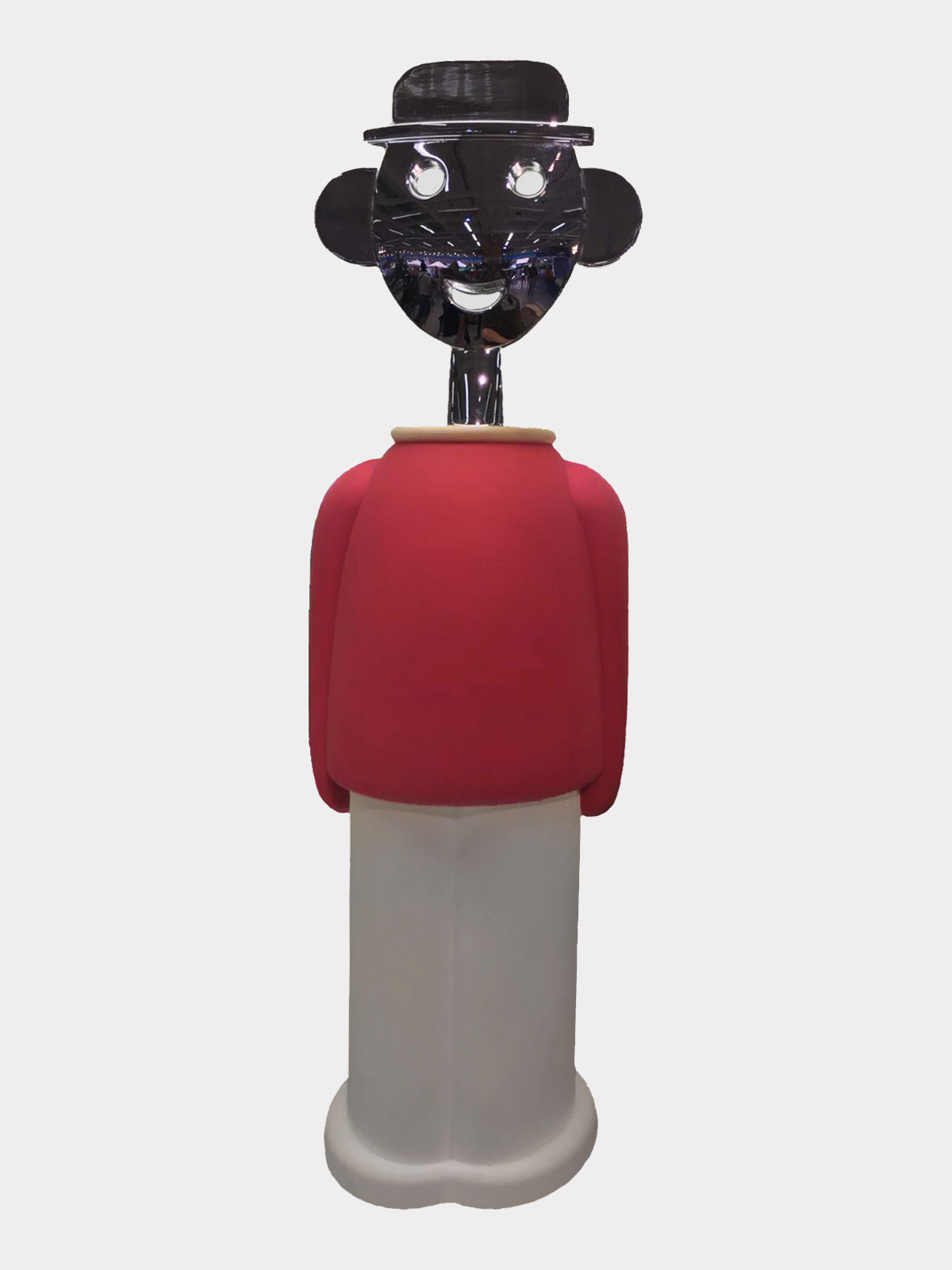
Alessi Alessandro M. bottle opener

In the 1970s Mendini was one of the main personalities of the Radical design movement. He became one of the founding members of the "Global Tools" collective, which was set up in 1973. In 1978 he joined the Studio Alchimia as a partner and there he worked with Ettore Sottsass and Michele De Lucchi. Mendini created a Proust chair that combines existing designs and abstract forms with a new concept of Re-Design. This chair proves that his experimental attempts are possible not only by experiment but also by realistic design logic. In 1982 he co-founded Domus Academy, a private postgraduate design school in Milan.

As an architect, he designed several buildings; for example the Alessi residence in Omegna, Italy; the theater complex "Teatrino della Bicchieraia" in the Tuscan city of Arezzo; the Forum Museum of Omegna, a memorial tower in Hiroshima, Japan; the Groninger Museum in The Netherlands and the Arosa Casino in Switzerland. Especially, The Groninger Museum is considered one of the most amazing postmodern buildings of the late 20th century, and was also selected as one of the “1001 Buildings You Must See Before You Die.”

His work in product design was influential in the sense that it pushed the boundaries of what products could be. A notable example is his Lassú chair from 1974, a chair built on top of a pyramid structure, which forgoes conventional notions of function. Mendini was addressing the domestic object as a conduit for spirituality, an idea reinforced by his ritualised burning of the chair, photographed for placement on the cover of Casabella in 1975.

As designer, the historical value of the RAMUN amuleto lamp designed in 2010 is the ring shape that accentuates the strengths of LED, which enhances lighting uniformity. The use of a transparent material flaunts the mechanism of the lamp. A mix of various colors in the minimalist structure, consisting of circles and straight lines without any spring or wire, inspires human sensibility. Thanks to its beautiful design and superior performance, the lamp is permanently displayed at the Moderne der Pinakothek in Munich, Germany, The Chicago Athenaeum Museum of Architecture and Design, the Groninger Museum in Netherlands, the Design Museum Denmark, DDP in Korea and the Tsinghua University Art Museum in China.

Amuleto was chosen as one of 100 objects representing Made in Italy design at the 2019 Italian Design Days, an event promoted by the Italian Ministry of Foreign Affairs and the Ministry of Cultural Heritage, and received the Good Design Award from The Chicago Athenaeum Museum of Architecture and Design.

== Exhibition ==
From 16 January – 10 May 2026, the Estorick Collection of Modern Italian Art exhibited Alessandro Mendini. The exhibit was the first solo exhibition of his work in the United Kingdom and featured paintings, drawings and other decorative objects.

== Awards ==
Alessandro Mendini was awarded several international prizes, including the Compasso d'Oro in 1979, 1981 and in 2014. In 2011, he was awarded with the title Doctor Honoris Causa of the Ecole normale supérieure de Cachan. In 2014, he was awarded The European Prize for Architecture by The Chicago Athenaeum and The European Centre for Architecture Art Design and Urban Studies. He held an honorary title from the Architectural League of New York as well as the title of Chevalier des Arts et des Lettres from the French Republic. He was awarded A&W Designer of the Year—considered the "Oscars of Design"--in 2017. In 2022, he was inducted into the 2022 Milan Hall of Fame .

== Quotes about Mendini ==
"Even if you've never heard of Alessandro Mendini, you're bound to have been affected by his work. That's because our lives would be different without him." 
– Alice Rawsthorn[citation needed]

"Alessandro Mendini is one of the rare, most iconic architects and architectural minds in the history of art and architecture and clearly within the profound ranks of Leonardo Da Vinci, Palladio, Alberti, and Ledoux. His philosophic thinking is more than original. He has pushed concept beyond the perimeters of the inventive, relentlessly searching, in a most non-compromising way, for the most essential design idea. And the results center on the most visionary and far-reaching of our times. In an era where architectural ideas are copied and duplicated worldwide faster than 'viral', Mendini and his works remain singular, prophetic, and original with the unique finger print of nothing less than a genius architect." 
– Christian Narkiewicz-Laine[citation needed]

"The Groninger Museum building in Groningen, The Netherlands, was designed by Alessandro Mendini and opened in 1994. We kept collecting works by the great Italian artist and were happy to acquirean Amuleto lamp. This lamp summarizes the ideals of the postmodern design, functional, yet colourful and playful. As director of the museum, turning on another Amuleto lamp on my desk was the first action every morning. It provided light and comfort all day. When I – recently – retired, the Amuleto lamp was the first thing that I took with me and installed at home." 
– Andreas Blühm — Groninger Museum[citation needed]
