= Domus Academy =

Design school in Milan, Italy

- Type: private school
- Established: 1982
- Managing director: Giorgio Lospennato
- Location: Milan, Italy; 45.4456°N 9.1744°E
- Campus: via Carlo Darwin 20; 20143 Milan
- Website: domusacademy.com
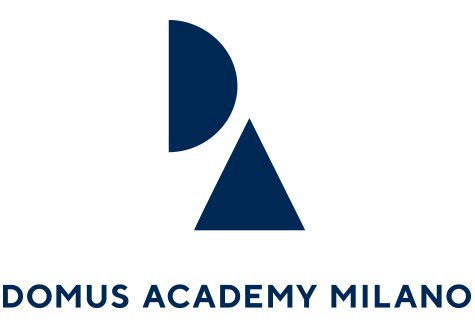

Domus Academy is a private school of design in Milan, in Lombardy in northern Italy. It offers undergraduate, post-graduate and professional courses in fashion, industrial design, and design management. It is not listed by the Ministero dell'Istruzione, dell'Università e della Ricerca, the Italian ministry of education, among the institutions authorised to award degrees in music, dance and the arts.

== History ==
Domus Academy was founded in 1982 by the Mazzocchi family, owners of Editoriale Domus, which publishes Domus and Quattroruote magazines. Maria Grazia Mazzocchi was president of the school. Gianfranco Ferré was on the staff from 1983 to 1989, and Andrea Branzi was cultural director for the first ten years. In 2009 the school was bought by Laureate Education of Baltimore, Maryland, for an estimated ten million euros. In 2018 Laureate sold it to the British group Galileo Global Education.

The institution received a Compasso d'Oro award from the Associazione per il Disegno Industriale in 1994, one of seven corporate recipients among the thirty awards made in that year. It is a member of the Cumulus Association.

== Rankings ==
In 2026 the school was ranked at number 62= in the art and design subject subdivision of the QS World University Rankings, up from its 201–260 ranking in 2025. In the UI GreenMetric World University Rankings for 2025 it was ranked at number 501 of the 1745 institutions assessed for sustainability, while in the Times Higher Education Impact Rankings for sustainability it was placed in the 1001–1500 bracket. It was not listed in the Times Higher Education World University Rankings for 2026.

== Alumni ==
Alumni include Anna Dello Russo and Neil Poulton.
