= Martine Bedin =

French architect and designer

- Born: 1957 (age 67–68); Bordeaux, France
- Known for: Design

Martine Bedin is a French architect and designer. She was a member of the Memphis Group.

== Biography ==
Bedin was born in 1957 in the port of Bordeaux where she knew Nathalie Du Pasquier who would be a fellow designer. She learnt about architecture in Paris. She was awarded a scholarship in 1978 and as a result she went to live in Florence. She discovered modern architecture there with Adolfo Natalini and the Superstudio group.

In 1979, Natalini invited her to Milan, when she met the designer Michele De Lucchi and the architect Ettore Sottsass. Also in 1979, her Casa Decorata was displayed at the Milan Triennial XVI. She worked with Sottsass who was based in Milan.

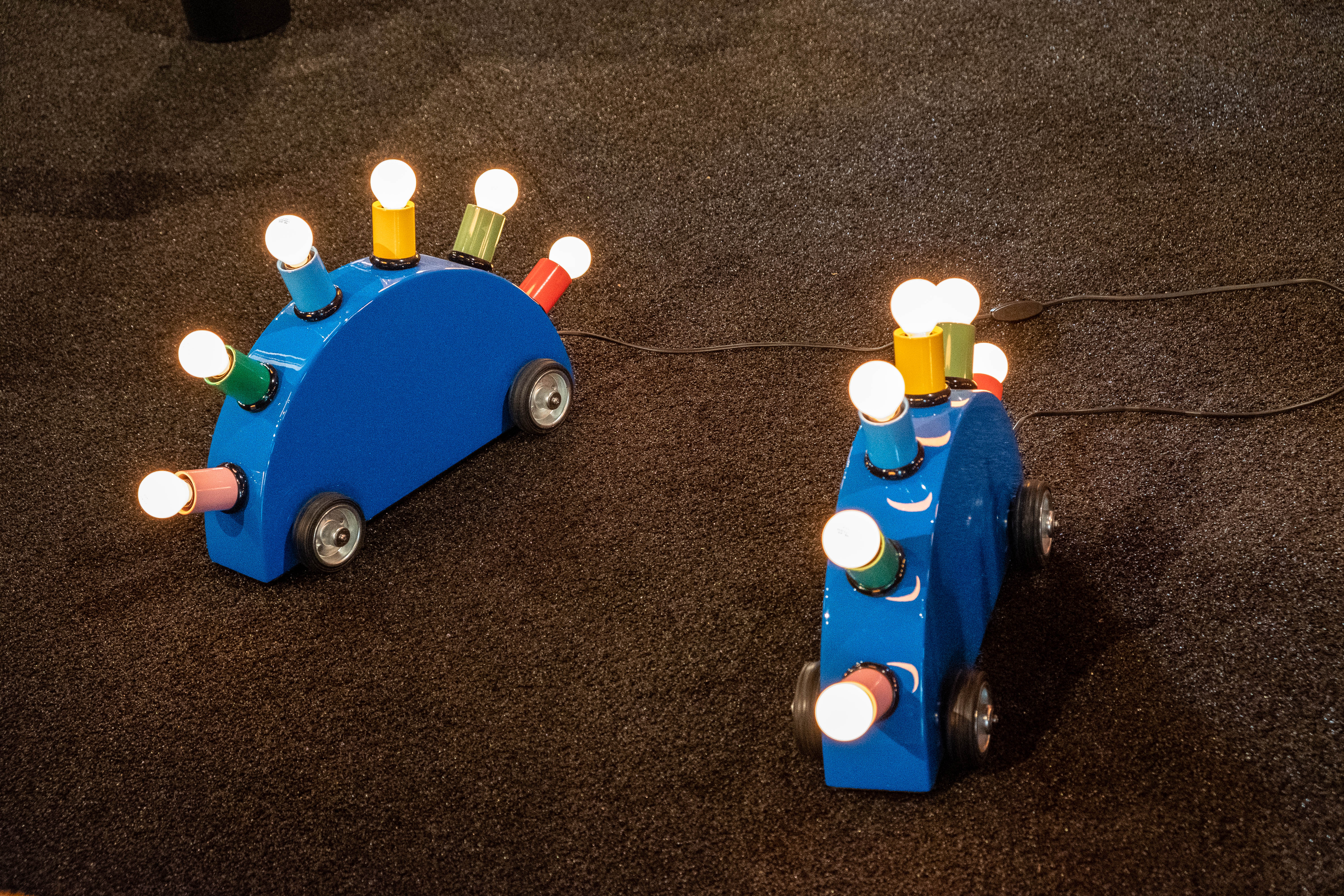
Super Lamps

In December 1980, Bedin was a co-founder of the Memphis-Milano Group when the Italian postmodern design collective was formed during a gathering at Barbara Radice's home in Milan. Bedin contributed to their debut collection in 1981 which included work by Matteo Thun, Andrea Branzi, Michele De Lucchi, Georges Sowden, Nathalie Du Pasquier, and Marco Zanini. She designed what she called the Super Lamp for the collection. She described it as "like a small dog that I could carry with me". The design for the lamp was found by Sottsass and his wife Barbara Radice in Bedin’s sketch book. Bedin offered the design to Sottass, but he instead invited her to work on it at his studio in Milan. There she manufactured it under her name. It is the Memphis Group’s most profitable object and the original prototype was later acquired by the Victoria and Albert Museum in London for their post-modern collection.

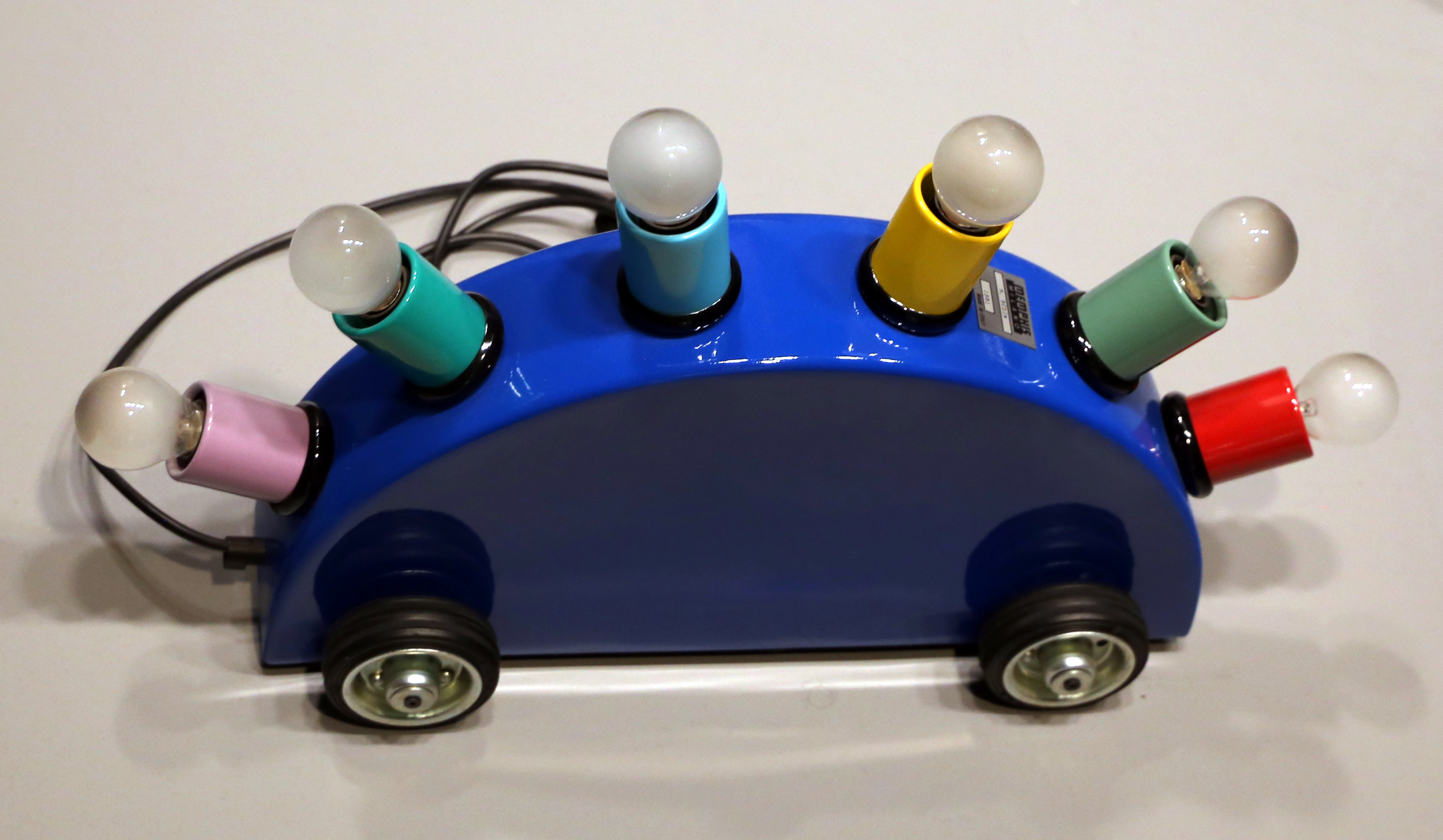
Super Lamp, Designed by Bedin for the Memphis Group in 1981

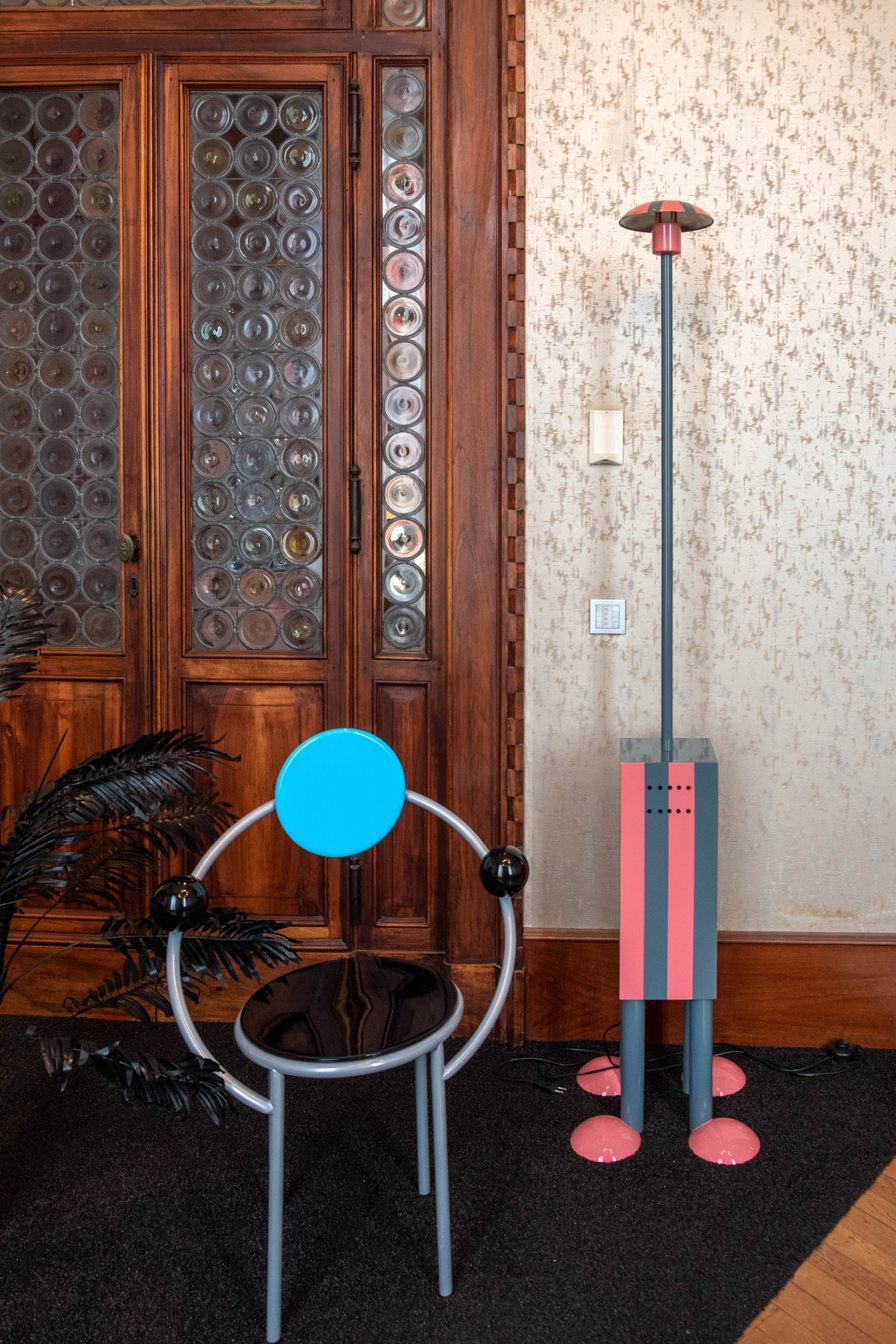
Bedin's "Terminus" lamp together with Michele De Lucchi's "First Chair" from 1981

In 1982, she opened a design and architecture office in Milan, and returned regularly to Paris, where she taught design at the Ecole Camondo.

In 1986, the city of Nîmes created Les Ateliers de Nîmes, and invited her with Jean Nouvel, Philippe Starck, Ross Lovegrove and Gérard Barrault to reflect on the city's major projects. She designed graphics and the interior design of the city's buses. She transformed a bus into a mobile meeting room and fitted out the public toilets in the city's Place de la Couronne.

In 1987, the French historical monuments entrusted her with the development of the reception of the Palais du Tau, Reims Cathedral, and the Château de Chambord. In 1989, she reorganized the library and the documentation center of the Caisse des Monuments Historiques, in the Hôtel de Sully in Paris. She designed a collection of handbags for Louis Vuitton as well as a new monogram canvas. Two chairs are produced by Promosedia in Udine, Italy.

In the summer of 1991, she launched her publishing house, la Manufacture familiale in Bordeaux, and the creation of a unique collection of large pieces of furniture for the BDX gallery. In 1992, she obtained a Carte de Blanche from the VIA for which she created a sofa and two armchairs, Persona non grata.

During the summer of 1994, she built her first house on the heights of Bordeaux, La Maison Rouge. In October 1995, she exhibited four houses in the nave of the CAPC, as part of their Architectures exhibition. Some of her works are kept at the Museum of Decorative Arts and Design in Paris or are part of the National Fund for Contemporary Art.

In 2017 she was dividing her time between Paris and Corsica.

== Awards and honors ==
In 1993, she was made a knight of the Ordre des Arts et des Lettres.
