= Cigierre =

Italian restaurant company

- Type: Società per azioni
- Industry: Food service
- Founded: 1995; 31 years ago in Martignacco, Italy
- Founders: Marco Di Giusto and Antonio Maria Bardelli
- Headquarters: Tavagnacco, Italy
- Number of locations: 342 (June 2026)
- Area served: Italy, France, Switzerland, Monaco
- Key people: Marco Di Giusto (CEO)
- Brands: Old Wild West, Wiener Haus, America Graffiti, Pizzikotto, Shi's, Smashie
- Owner: Funds advised by BC Partners (majority)
- Number of employees: 4,980 (June 2026)
- Website: www.cigierre.com/en

Cigierre – Compagnia Generale Ristorazione S.p.A. is an Italian restaurant company that operates and franchises several restaurant chains. Founded in 1995 in Martignacco, near Udine, the company manages brands including Old Wild West, Wiener Haus, America Graffiti, Pizzikotto, Shi's and Smashie.

The group operates restaurants in Italy and other European countries, including France, Switzerland and Monaco. Cigierre is majority-owned by funds advised by the private equity firm BC Partners, with QuattroR holding a minority stake since 2025.

In the first half of 2026, Cigierre reported a network of 342 restaurants, comprising 215 directly operated locations and 127 franchised restaurants. The group employed approximately 4,980 people.

== History ==
=== Foundation and early development ===
Cigierre was founded in 1995 by Marco Di Giusto and Antonio Maria Bardelli in Martignacco, near Udine, in the Italian region of Friuli-Venezia Giulia. The company initially developed restaurant concepts at the Città Fiera shopping centre in Torreano di Martignacco.

In 2002, Cigierre opened its first Old Wild West restaurant, a steakhouse with an American Old West theme. The company subsequently expanded the chain through franchising, beginning in 2005.

In 2007, the company developed Wiener Haus, a restaurant concept inspired by Central European beer halls and cuisine.

During its early expansion, the private equity firm Paladin Capital Partners acquired a stake in Cigierre. In 2012, the investment group L Capital, associated with LVMH, also invested in the company.

=== Acquisitions and expansion ===
In 2015, Cigierre acquired Shi's, a Japanese restaurant chain based in the Udine area.

In November 2015, BC Partners announced an agreement to acquire a majority stake in Cigierre from Marco Di Giusto, L Capital and Paladin Capital Partners. The transaction, completed in early 2016, valued the company at approximately €300 million.

In 2016, Cigierre acquired Pizzikotto, a restaurant chain originating in Emilia-Romagna, specialising in pizza. That year, the group reported more than 300 million euros in sales and operated over 200 restaurants.

In October 2017, the group acquired control of America Graffiti, a restaurant chain inspired by American diners of the 1950s. The acquisition contributed to the expansion of the group's restaurant portfolio and its network-wide sales, which were reported at approximately €400 million.

In October 2018, Cigierre acquired a majority stake in Temakinho, a restaurant chain specialising in Japanese–Brazilian fusion cuisine. At the time, Temakinho operated ten restaurants across Italy, the United Kingdom and Spain, including locations in Milan, Rome, London, Ibiza and Formentera.

=== Recent developments ===
In 2023, Cigierre launched Smashie, a restaurant concept focused on smash burgers. The company also established the Cigierre Academy, a training centre for its employees and franchisees.

On 1 March 2024, Cigierre completed the sale of Temakinho to the German investment company Mutares. At the time, the chain operated ten directly managed restaurants and four franchised locations, including restaurants at Italian airports and in Lyon, France.

In March 2025, the Italian private equity fund QuattroR acquired a minority stake in Cigierre through a capital increase, alongside investments from Anthilia Capital Partners and members of the company's management. BC Partners retained majority ownership.

In 2024, Cigierre's restaurant network recorded approximately €545 million in sales, with 362 restaurants under its different brands.

In October 2026, the company reported that its network had generated €264 million in sales during the first half of the year, including €180 million from directly operated restaurants. It also reported EBITDA of €39 million and projected network-wide sales of €551 million for the full year.

== Restaurant brands ==
An Old Wild West restaurant in Avezzano in 2017.

Cigierre has developed and acquired several restaurant chains, operating through a combination of directly managed restaurants and franchised locations.

- Old Wild West: The group's flagship restaurant chain, established in 2002. Its restaurants are inspired by the American Old West and specialise in hamburgers, grilled meat and Tex-Mex cuisine.
- Wiener Haus: A restaurant chain inspired by Central European cuisine and beer halls, serving dishes such as schnitzel alongside German and Austrian beer styles.
- America Graffiti: Acquired by Cigierre in 2017, this chain is inspired by American diners of the 1950s.
- Pizzikotto: Acquired in 2016, the brand specialises in pizza and Italian cuisine.
- Shi's: A Japanese restaurant chain acquired in 2015, focusing on sushi and Japanese-inspired fusion cuisine.
- Smashie: A quick-service restaurant brand launched in 2023, specialising in smash burgers.

=== Former brands ===
- Temakinho: A Japanese–Brazilian fusion restaurant chain in which Cigierre acquired a majority stake in 2018. The business was sold to Mutares in March 2024.

== Awards and recognition ==
- Retailer of the Year: Cigierre's Old Wild West brand received the Italian Retailer of the Year award in the table-service restaurant category on several occasions, including in 2013, 2015 and 2016.
- CNCC Retailer Award 2016: Cigierre received awards in the Food and Restaurant category, as well as a special award recognising innovation in restaurant formats and marketing.
- SMAU Innovation Award 2017: Cigierre was recognised at the SMAU innovation awards in Milan for its digital transformation initiatives developed in collaboration with the Italian software company Zucchetti.
