= Massimo Iosa Ghini =

Italian architect and designer (born 1959)

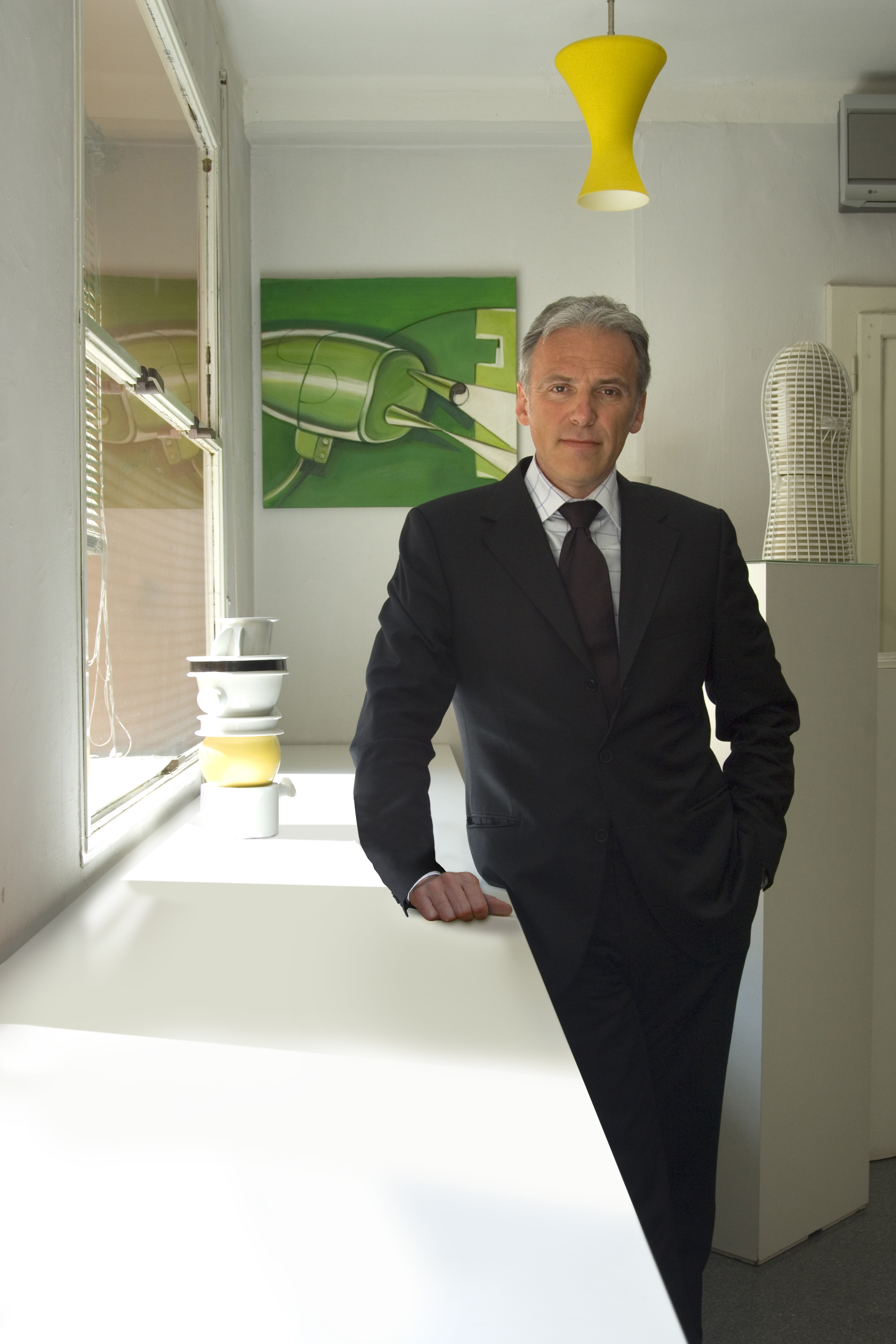
- Born: 18 June 1959 (age 67); Bologna, Italy
- Education: Milan Polytechnic
- Occupation: Architect
- Practice: Iosa Ghini Associati
- Buildings: Ferrari Factory Store, Serravalle Scrivia; IBM, Rome; People Mover, Bologna
- Website: iosaghini.it

Massimo Iosa Ghini (born 18 June 1959) is an Italian architect, designer, and professor, known for his contributions to the Bolidist Movement and his work with Memphis Group architects such as Ettore Sottsass and Michael Graves. His career spans decades and includes projects in Italy, the United States, and Russia. He owns a substantial collection of furniture, reflecting his futuristic design style. In 1990, he founded the architecture and design firm Iosa Ghini Associati in Milan.

== Schooling ==
Massimo Iosa Ghini was born in Bologna, Italy, on 18 June 1959. Initially interested in illustration, he developed a passion for architecture and studied it at Milan Polytechnic. He graduated in the 1980s, and the fast-paced nature of the decade influenced much of his later work. After graduating, he worked on furniture and set design for the Italian RAI TV network.

In 1981, his unconventional designs drew the attention of the Memphis Group, a Milan-based collective of architects and designers whose furniture incorporated colors, shapes, and patterns that challenged traditional design conventions. Works from this period include "Bertrand" sideboard and the "Otello" armchair, one of which was sold at auction from the collection of the late David Bowie in 2016.

Iosa Ghini has held teaching positions at Sapienza University in Rome, the Hong Kong University of Science and Technology, and Ferrara University.

== Bolidism ==
Massimo Iosa Ghini is recognized as a pioneer of Bolidism, an artistic style that borrows elements from futurism and often focuses on human and machine interaction.

== Architecture ==
In 1990, Iosa Ghini co-founded Iosa Ghini Associati with his wife, Milena Mussi. Since then, his firm has worked with international groups on large-scale residential, commercial, and public space projects, including the 2015 design for the Ferrari Factory Store in Milan.

In 2012, the Italian Pavilion at the Venice Architecture Biennale featured Iosa Ghini's work on the "Seat Pagine Gialle" offices in Turin in their exhibition, "Architecture del Made in Italy."

== Product design ==
Several of Iosa Ghini's works were featured in the Memphis Project. His furniture concepts belong to museum collections. Iosa Ghini has received several design awards, including the Good Design Award from the Chicago Athenaeum, the Roscoe Award, the IAI Green Design Award in China, the iF Product Design Award, and the Red Dot Award.

== Work ==
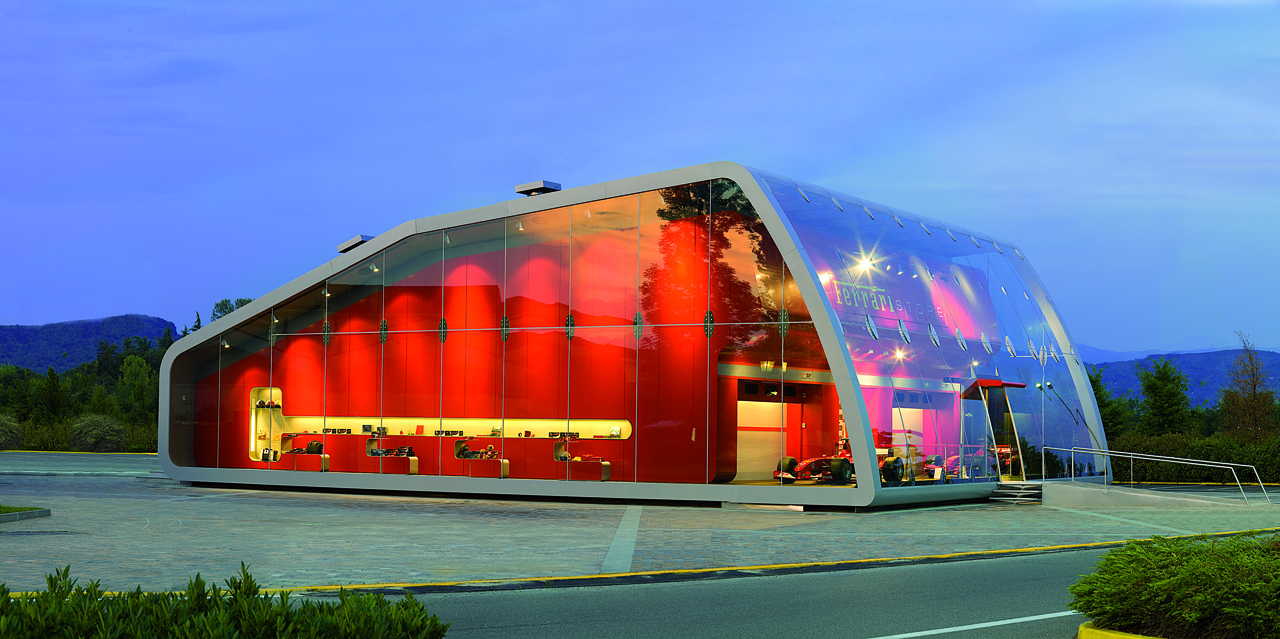
Ferrari Factory Store

The Iosa Ghini website features the following projects:

- Brickell Flatiron, Miami (USA) - Currently under construction
- Marconi Express, People Mover, Bologna (Italy)
- OKO Residential Building, Moscow (Russia) - Completed in 2016
- "Linea di Luce" (Italy) - Completed in 2014
- IBM Italia, IBM Software Executive Briefing Center, Rome (Italy) - Completed in 2010
- Garage San Marco, Venice (Italy) - Completed in 2009
- Ferrari Factory Store, Serravalle Scrivia (Italy) - Completed in 2009
- Ferrari, Galleria Museo Ferrari, Maranello (Italy) - Completed in 2004
- Boscolo Group, New York Residence, Budapest (Hungary) - Completed in 2004
- Kiko Make Up Milano, Stores - Ongoing since 2006
- Superga, Stores - Established in 1997

== Bibliography ==
- Massimo Iosa Ghini, Sillavengo, Edition Rossi Schreiber, 1991
- Massimo Iosa Ghini Disegni, Kalòs, 1992
- Massimo Iosa Ghini, N.N. Edizioni, Düsseldorf, 1993
- La Stazione della metropolitana Kroepke a Hannover, Electa, Milan, 2000
- 15 anni di progetti, Electa, Milan, 2001
- Car Corporate Image, Electa, Milan, 2002
- Design del Negozio - lo Spazio Esperienziale, 2002
- Esercizi di architettura - Involucri – Exercises in architecture, Electa, Milan, 2003
- Massimo Iosa Ghini da designer ad architetto, Editrice Compositori, Bologna, 2005
- Massimo Iosa Ghini, Disegni di architetture, Antonia Jannone Galleria, 2007
- Sostenibile Ma Bello. Progetti di Iosa Ghini Associati Editrice Compositori, Bologna, 2009
- Design del XX secolo, Charlotte & Peter Fiell, Taschen, 2011
- Agora / Form and Technology / IBM Software Executive Briefing Center – Rome, Electa, Milan, 2012
- I protagonisti del design – Massimo Iosa Ghini, Vol. 33, Hachette Fascicoli, Milan, 2012
- Massimo Iosa Ghini, Skira Editore, Milan, 2013
