= Matteo Thun =

Italian architect and designer

Matteo Thun (Mathäus Antonius Maria Graf von Thun and Hohenstein, 17 June 1952 Bolzano, Italy) is an Italian architect and designer.

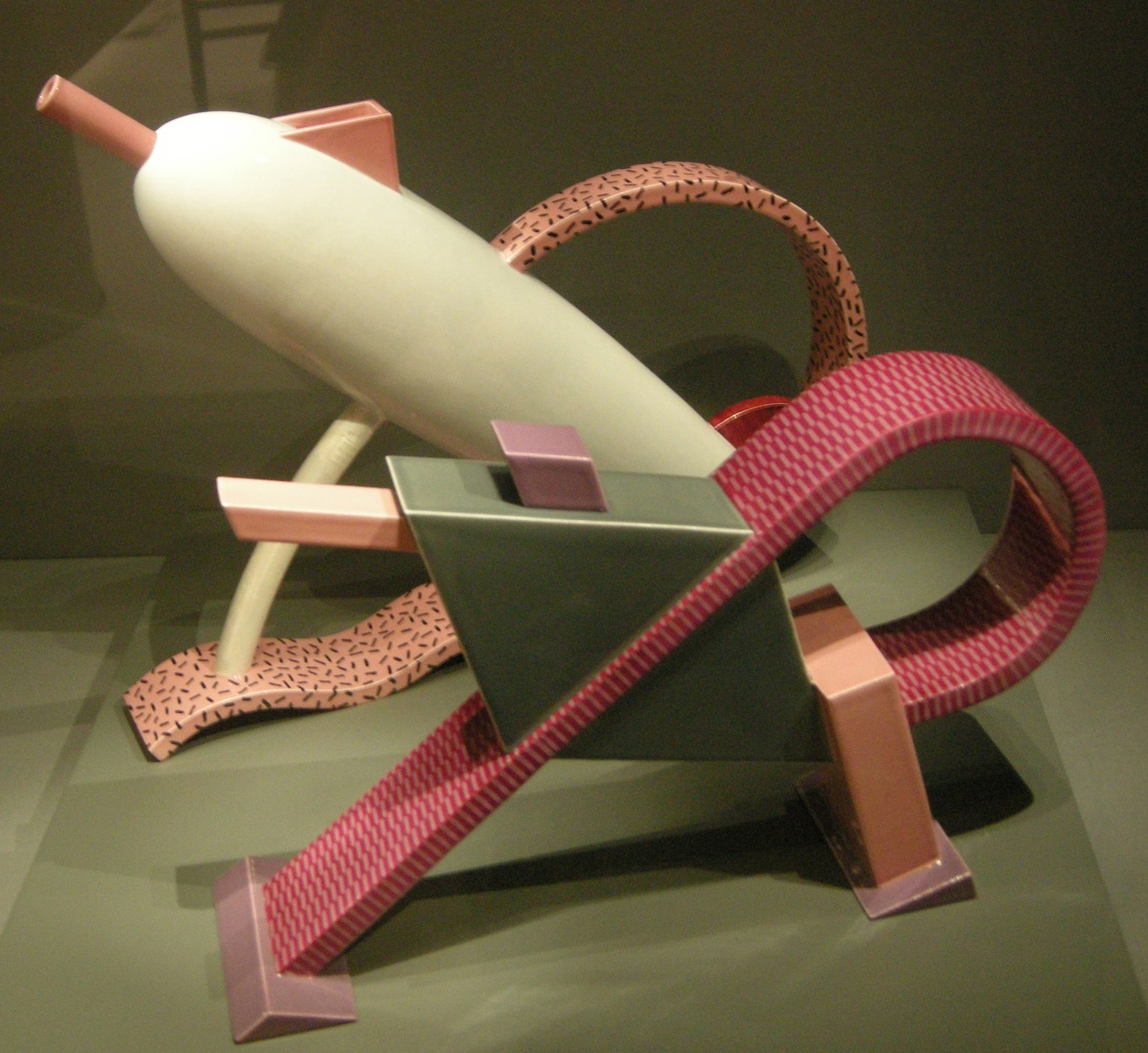
Matteo Thun, Laurum marinus, teapot and coffeepot, Alessio Sarri Ceramiche, 1982

== Early life ==
Mathäus Antonius Maria Graf von Thun und Hohenstein was born in Bolzano in 1952. He was the eldest son of the Helene Grabmayr von Angerheim and Otmar von Thun-Hohenstein, who were ceramicists and proprietors of Thun Ceramic Workshops, an artisanal ceramic firm based out of the basement of their family's castle, Ansitz Klebenstein.

Matteo Thun studied at the Salzburg Academy under Oskar Kokoschka and Emilio Vedova. He graduated in 1975 with a degree in architectural studies at the University of Florence.

== Career ==
In 1978 he moved to Milan, met Ettore Sottsass, and in 1981 co-founded Sottsass Associati and the Memphis Group. In 1984 he founded his own studio and worked for Swatch as art director from 1990 to 1993. From 1983 to 2000 he was professor of design and ceramics at the University of Applied Arts in Vienna.

He founded Matteo Thun & Partners, a multicultural architecture and design studio with headquarters in Milan, Italy and a subsidiary in Munich, Germany. The company operates internationally and develops hospitality, residential, headquarters, retail and urban design projects and master planning. Together with his partner Antonio Rodriguez, the office employs 70 experts from the fields of architecture, design and communication. Thun's wife Susanne has been the trend researcher for the business for 30 years. The couple's two sons work in artistic professions.

== Work (selection) ==
=== Architecture ===
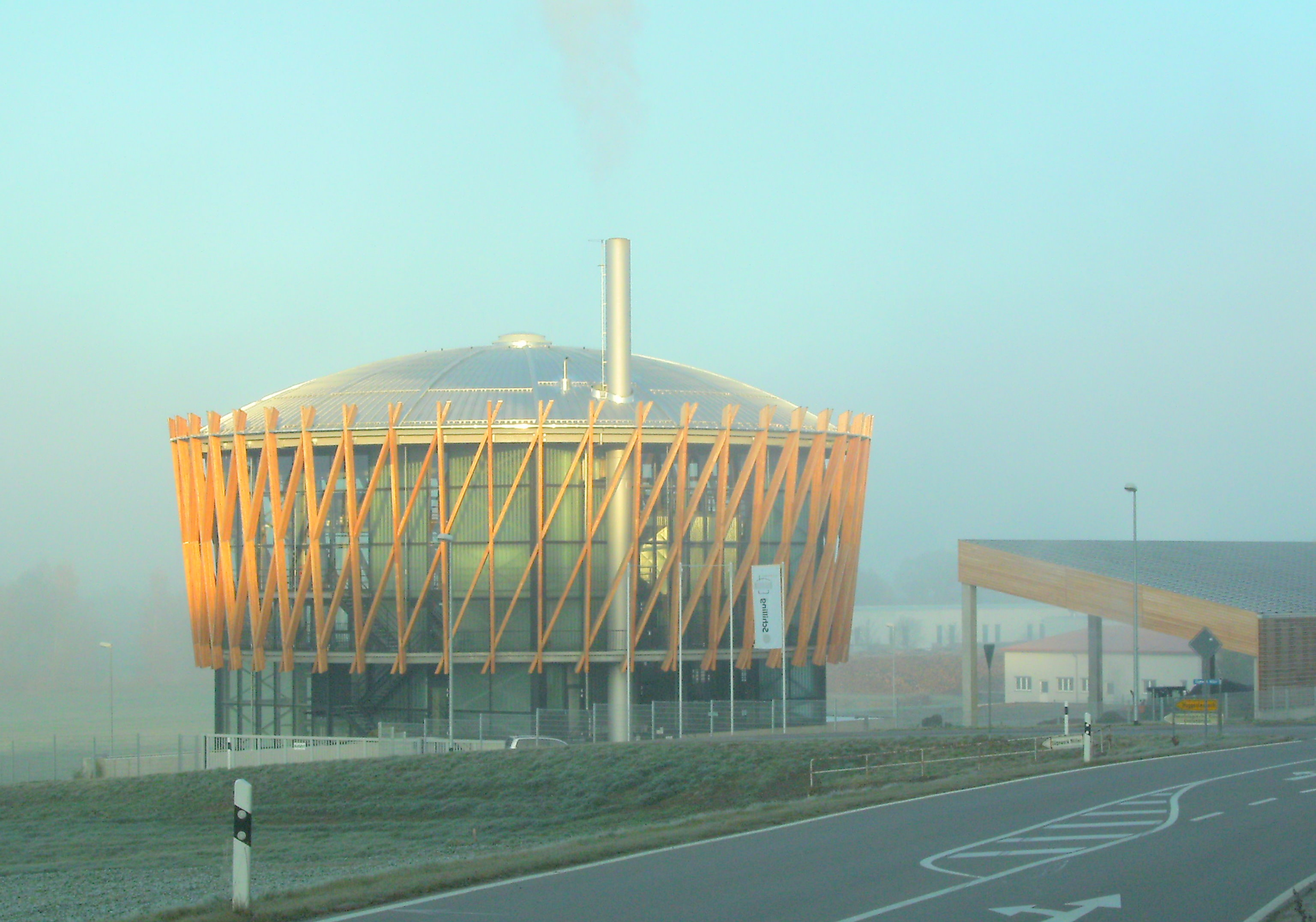
Bio Power Station, Schwendi, Germany

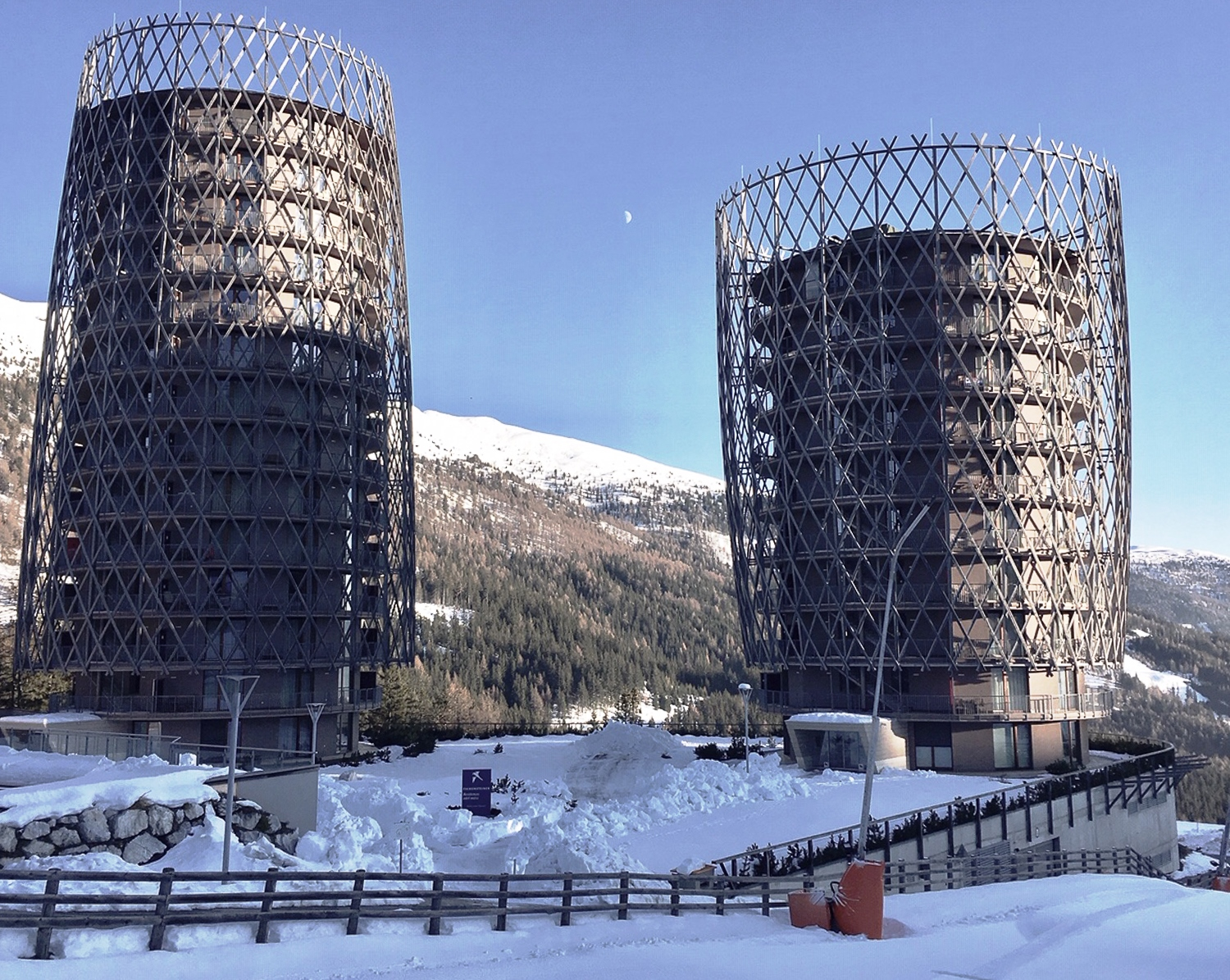
Apartmenthotel Cristallo, Katschberg, Austria

- 1990 – O Sole Mio, prefabricated house system
- 2001 – City Hotel Side, Hamburg
- 2003 – Vigilius Mountain Resort
- 2006 – Hugo Boss Headquarters Switzerland, Coldrerio
- 2008 – Worldwide "Retail System" for Porsche Design
- 2008 – Thun Store, Bolzano
- 2009 – Holzwerk Schilling Biomass Power Plant
- 2015 – JW Marriott Venice Resort + Spa, Sacca Sessola
- 2017 – Worldwide "Design Standard" for IntercityHotels
- 2017 – Waldhotel Healthy Living at Bürgenstock Resort

=== Design ===
Memphis

- 1987 – Bulgari watches
- 1986 – Campari glasses
- 2001 – Illy Cup Espresso Cups and Cafe Accessories
- 2002 – Zucchetti Bath collections
- 2005 – Artemide Lamp Collections
- 2008 – Zwilling J. A. Henckels Kitchenware
- 2011 – Duravit Bath collections
- 2012 – Venini Vases
- 2013 – Geberit shower toilet
- 2015 – Klafs Sauna, Steam
- 2015 – Axent shower toilet
- 2017 – Fantini Bath collections

=== Literature ===
The index book

== Recognition ==
Matteo Thun received several Wallpaper* Magazine Awards, Red Dot Awards, Good Design Awards, IF Product Design Awards and Green Good Design Awards for his Product Designs.

For his Architecture and Interior projects his office was awarded by Green Good Design Architecture, European Hotel Design Award/Architecture + Interior, Hospitality Design Award, MIPIM Award and the Wellness Travel Award.
