= Memphis Group =

Italian design collective

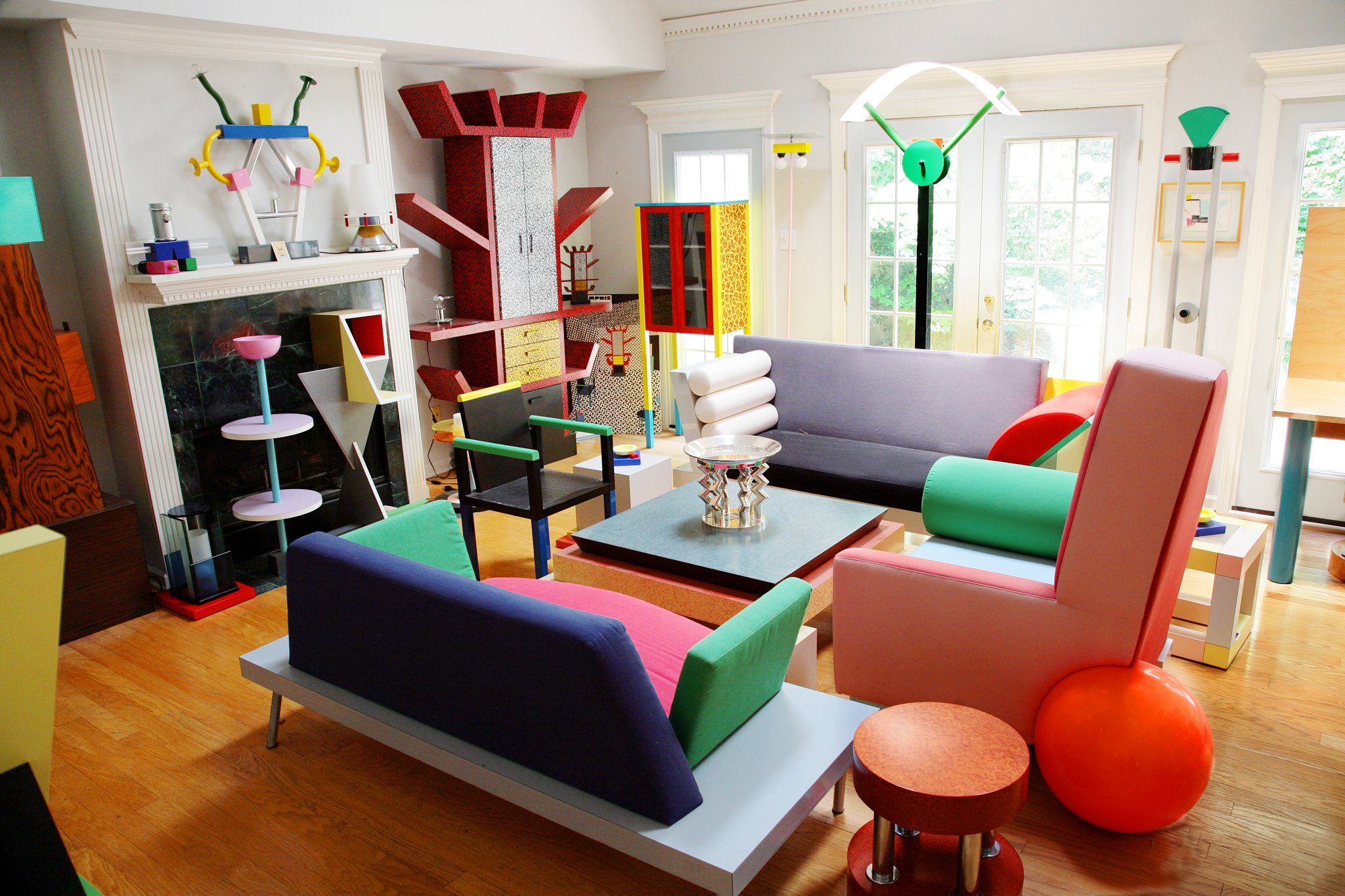
A collection of objects by the Memphis Group

The Memphis Group, also known as Memphis Milano, was an Italian design and architecture group founded by Ettore Sottsass. It was active from 1980 to 1987. The group designed postmodern furniture, lighting, fabrics, carpets, ceramics, glass and metal objects.

The Memphis Group's work often incorporated plastic laminate and terrazzo materials and was characterized by ephemeral design featuring colorful and abstract decoration as well as asymmetrical shapes, sometimes arbitrarily alluding to exotic or earlier styles and designs. Despite the original group's disbandment, Memphis Design went on to become a ubiquitous aesthetic in popular culture of the mid-1980s to mid-1990s, overtaking the earth tones of the 1970s and early 1980s. In the late 1990s, Memphis was succeeded by the Y2K aesthetic.

== Background ==
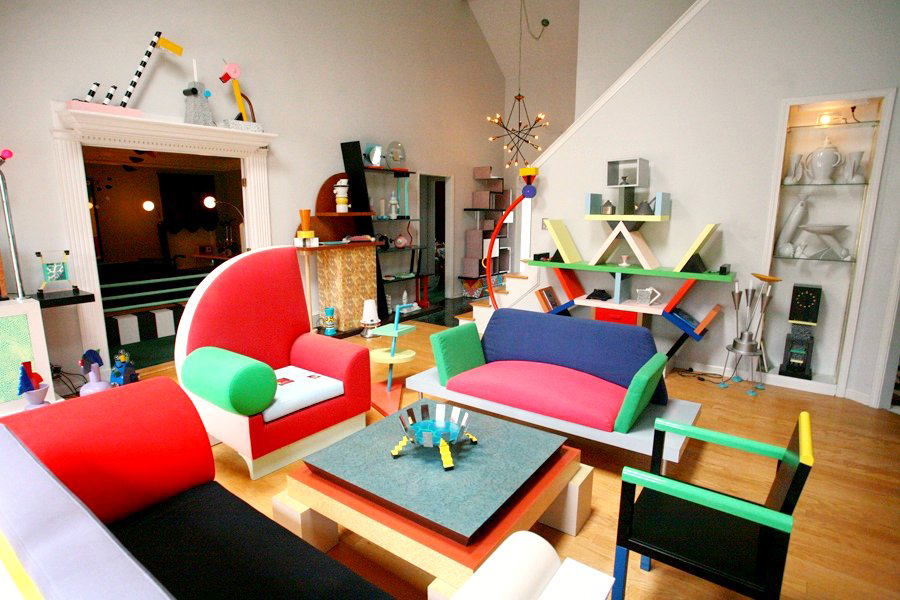
Memphis Group furniture featured within a living room space

Memphis was born on the evening of December 6, 1980, when Sottsass invited a group of young designers and architects to discuss the future of design. Together, they wanted to change the concept of what design had been focused on, which had been Modernism and aimed to do so by creating and forming a new design collective. After their initial meeting, the group went away to brainstorm different ideas and concepts, and three months later came back together ready to share over a hundred drawings they had produced during that time.

The inspiration behind naming themselves "Memphis" came about during their first meeting when Bob Dylan's record "Stuck Inside of Mobile with the Memphis Blues Again" had been playing repeatedly in the background. "Memphis" is the name of a city in Tennessee, which was named after a capital city of ancient Egypt. The group of designers used the ambiguity behind the name to represent and symbolise their ambiguous design philosophies of furniture, objects and textiles. Sottsass showed great interest in the middle-class taste, the traditions of the Third World and the East, and unspoiled nature.

Sottsass left the group in 1985 to focus on his design and architecture firm, Sottsass Associati. The group disbanded in 1987.

== Impact ==
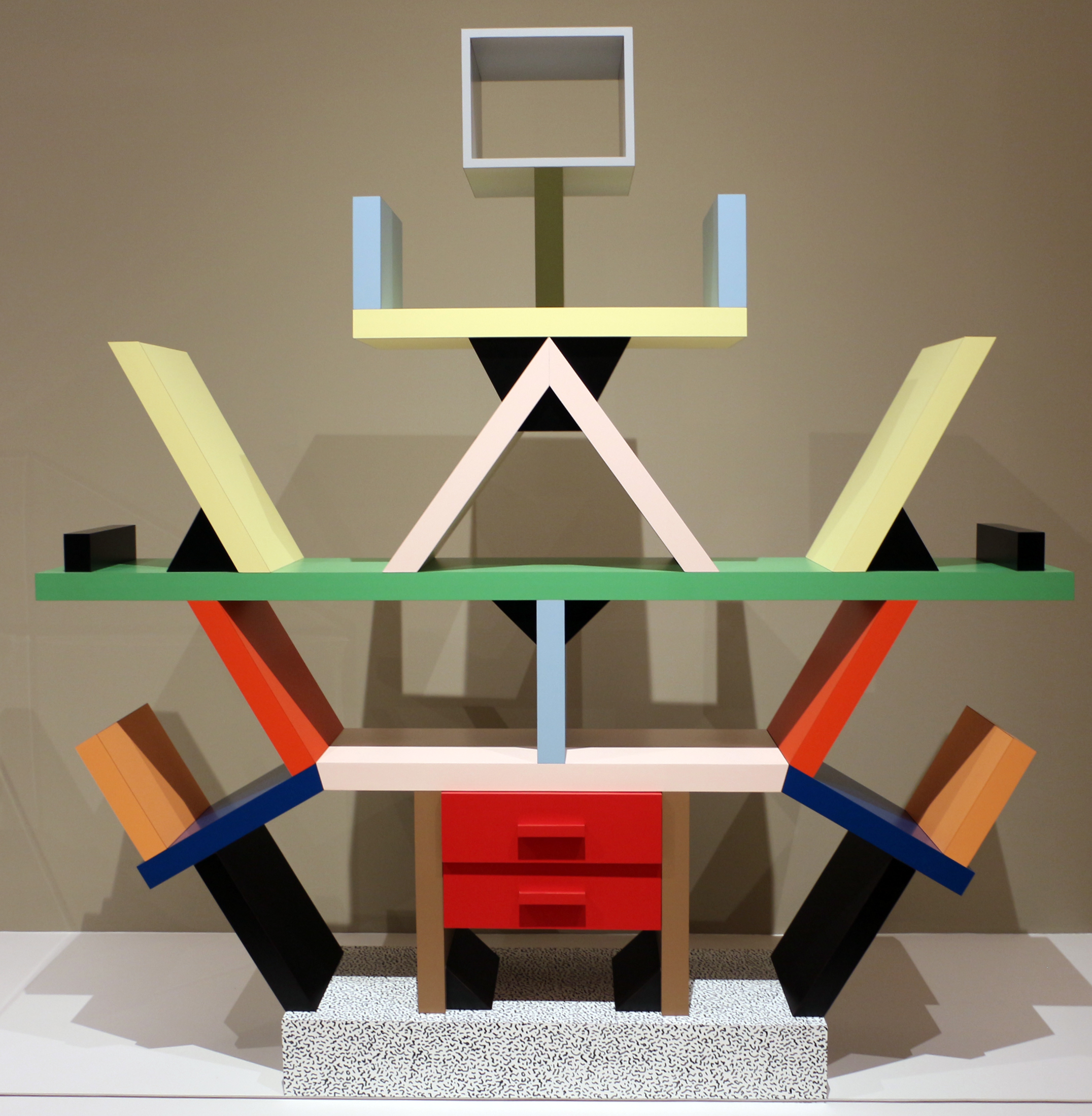
Carlton room divider by Ettore Sottsass for Memphis, 1981

Memphis' colorful furniture has been described as "bizarre", "misunderstood", "loathed", and "a shotgun wedding between Bauhaus and Fisher-Price". Terence Conran, arguably the leading figure in British design, said of Memphis that "Sottsass meant it as a joke! It's joke junk." Jasper Morrison, the British furniture designer, recalled the "cold sweat" and "shock and panic" he felt upon his first encounter with Memphis products, but also the sense of being "immediately freed by the total rule-breaking" they represented.

During their active years, the group designed a series of non-conformist furniture. One of their most popular and well-known designs is the "Carlton" Room Divider, a totemic pole incorporating a variety of bright colours, solid shapes and voids. The structure itself is constructed using cheap plastic laminates, though designed to be sold by a luxury market, and incorporates a series of equilateral triangles, both real and implied.

Memphis Design was heavily featured in the popular culture of the mid-1980s to mid-1990s, such as in television, movies, video games, furniture, mall architecture, household items, and clothes. Surfing, skateboarding, skiing, and BMX companies were quick to adopt the aesthetic into their designs. Television shows such as Miami Vice showcased many architectural examples. Nickelodeon used the style as the basis for their Double Dare set design. In the late 1990s, Memphis was supplanted by the Y2K futurism aesthetic.

Memphis Group served as inspiration for the Christian Dior's Fall/Winter 2011–2012 haute couture collection fashion show, for the Winter 2015 Missoni collection. In the 2010s, Memphis Design styles were often incorporated into the vaporwave Internet aesthetic.

Notable Memphis style collectors included fashion designer Karl Lagerfeld and musician David Bowie. Bowie, a passionate collector of the design collective's pieces, described the "jolt" and "impact" of entering a room with a Memphis cabinet. He noted that its effect was "visceral," especially when it first emerged. After Bowie's death in 2016, part of his collection, including the pieces he owned from the Memphis Group, was auctioned off at a Sotheby's auction.

A "flat, geometric, figurative" illustration style "usually made up of solid colours", popular in the late 2010s, particularly with startups, was dubbed "Corporate Memphis" by Wired Magazine for its resemblance to Memphis style.

== Designers ==
Being the founder of the group, Ettore Sottsass became the leader of the Memphis Group and is now one of the most well known Italian post-War designers.

Martine Bedin, a French designer, was also a member of Memphis. She first joined the group when she was in her twenties and was deemed in charge of overlooking all Memphis lighting that was produced. Her father had been an engineer and she was also continuously 'playing with forbidden things', all of which contributed to her designated position. During her time in Memphis, Bedin designed and thought of numerous ideas. Her design of the Super lamp placed on wheels, first designed in 1978, supposedly represented, along with a group of other objects, "friend-like" items. Bedin's lamp was later produced in an artisanal workshop, where all Memphis products were manufactured, and her first prototype is now featured in the Victoria & Albert Museum, in London, England.

Peter Shire, a sculptor, designer and potter originally from California, was another figure who formed the Memphis Group. He was first discovered thanks to Wet: The Magazine of Gourmet Bathing, a lifestyle publication on the west coast that Sottsass's partner on occasion would contribute to. In one article featuring Shire's teapots in 1977, he quoted "I'm not much of a tea-drinker [...] Actually my first impulse is to put Coke in teapots. I'm a big Coke drinker and I'd love to see Coke flowing out of the teapots and foaming on the ground." His unique approach and attitude later secured him a spot as a member of Memphis.

After Memphis's disbandment in 1987, members went their separate ways. Some, including Nathalie Du Pasquier, a French-born ex-member of the group, have collaborated with brands and companies in recent years. In 2013, she and the Danish company HAY collaborated where she designed and created Memphis-esque patterned bags. She later on also collaborated with American Apparel, a Canadian-founded fashion company that moved to California, where she designed one of their collections.

The designs of the Memphis Group have acted as an inspiration to many other fashion companies, such as Dior and Missoni, who were inspired to design fashion collections based on Memphis's original work.

Memphis included contributions from many international architects and designers. Notable members include:

- Martine Bedin
- Andrea Branzi
- Aldo Cibic
- Michele De Lucchi
- Nathalie du Pasquier
- Massimo Iosa Ghini
- Michael Graves
- Shiro Kuramata
- Javier Mariscal
- Alessandro Mendini
- Barbara Radice
- Peter Shire
- Ettore Sottsass
- George Sowden
- Matteo Thun
- Marco Zanini
- Marco Zanuso

== Gallery ==
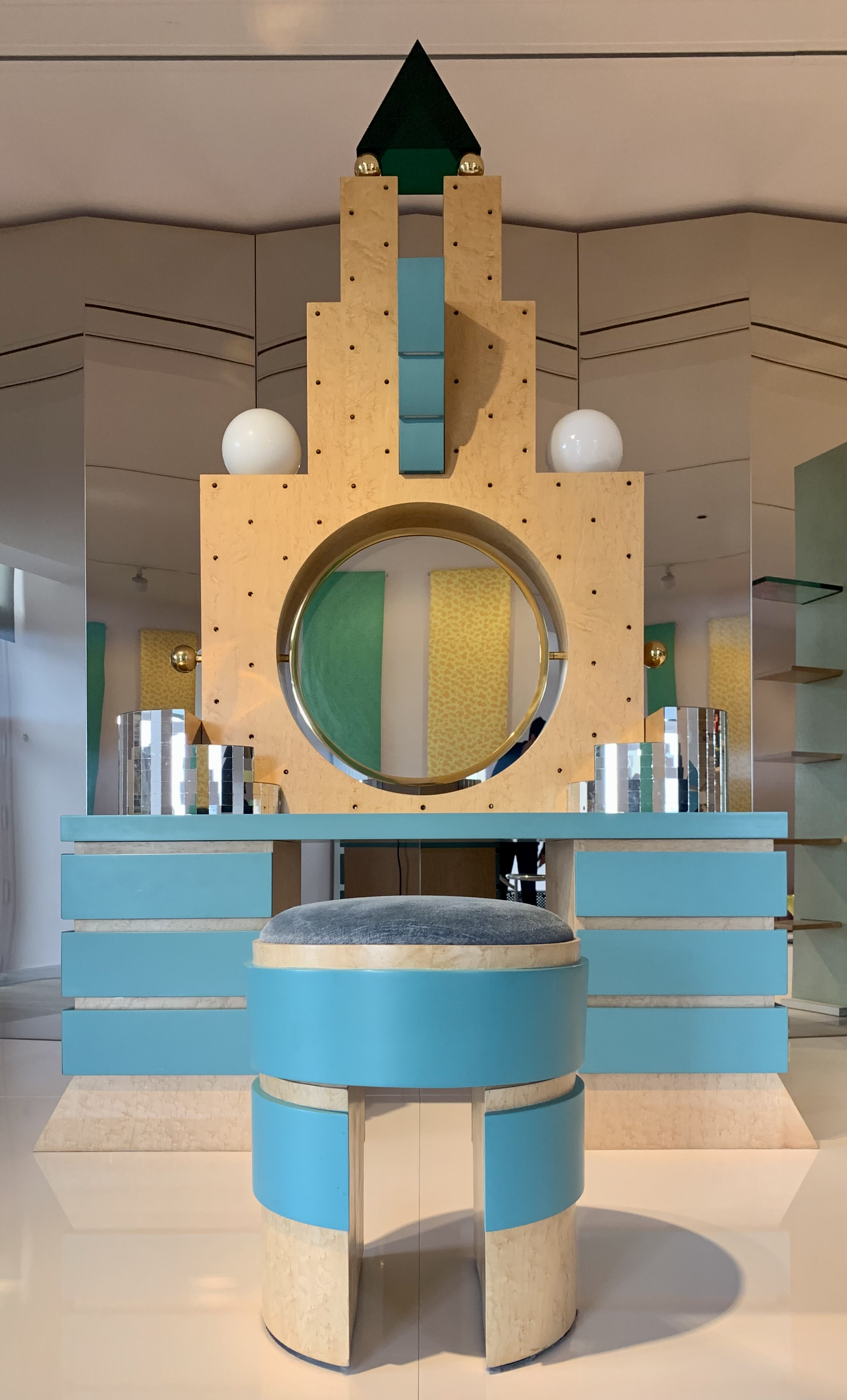
Plaza dressing table and stool, by Michael Graves, 1981, painted wood, natural rosehips, mirrors and bulbs, Museum of Decorative Arts, Paris

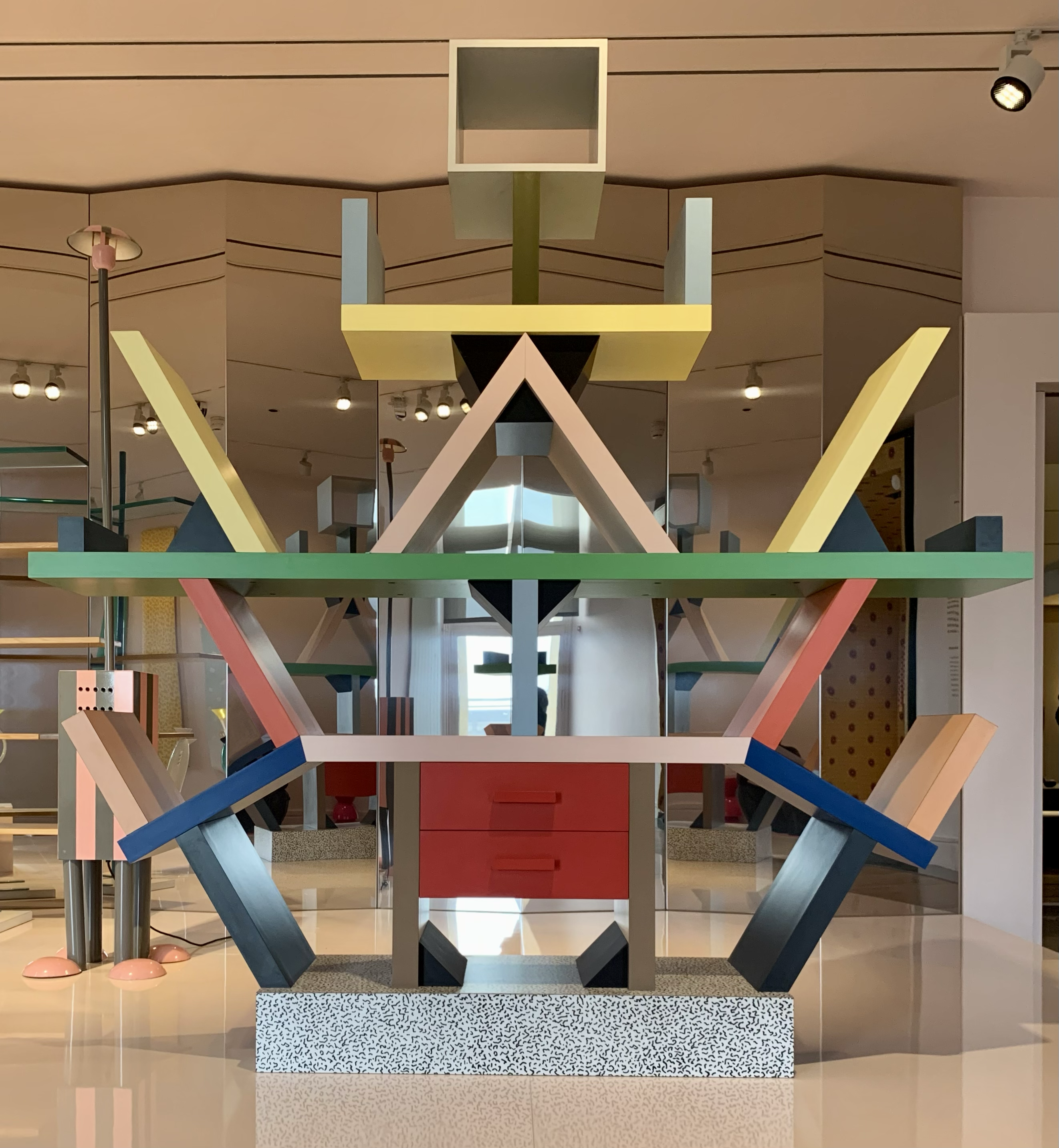
Carlton Bookcase, by Ettore Sottsass, 1981, wood veneer and plastic laminate, Museum of Decorative Arts, Paris

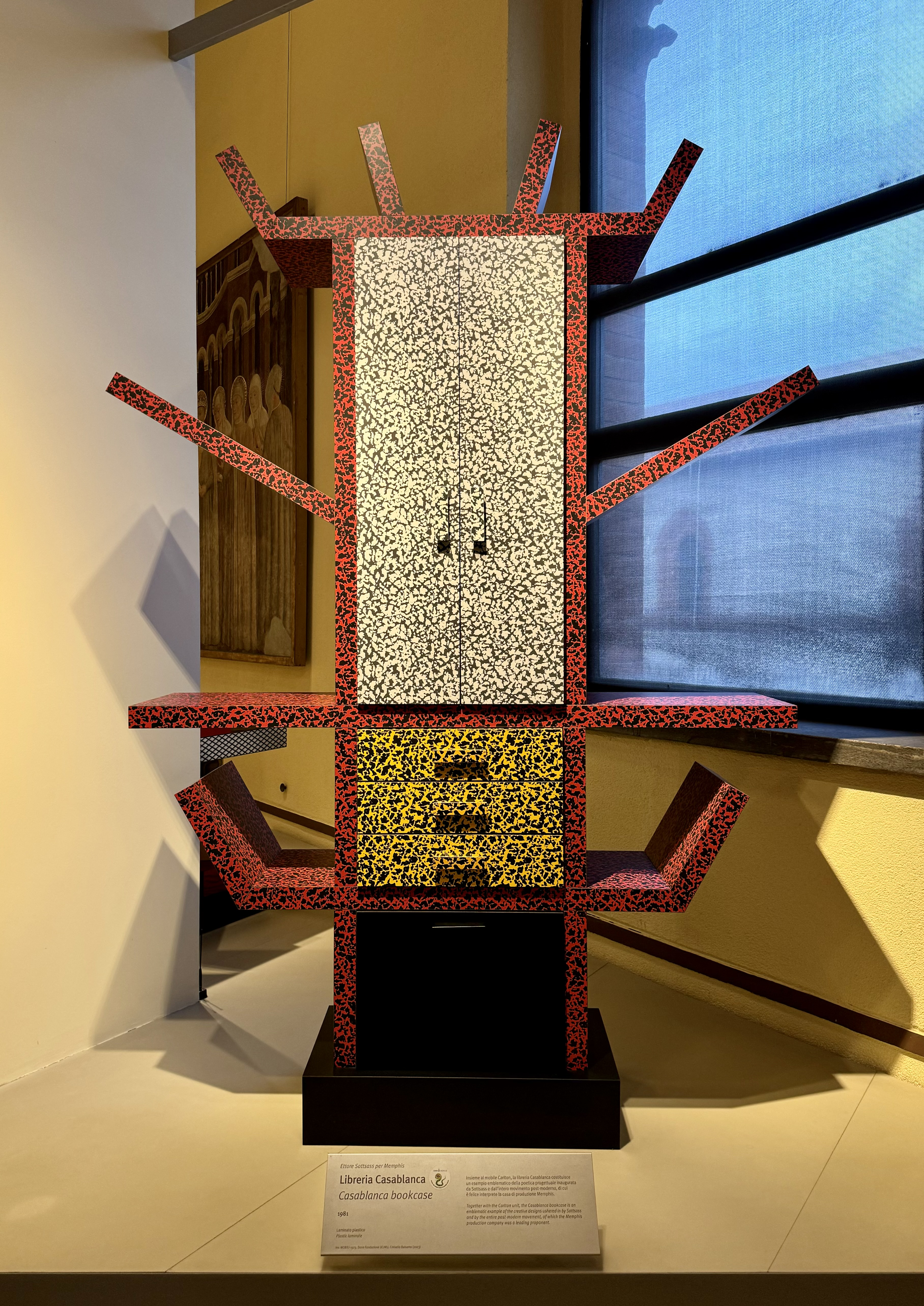
Casablanca Bookcase, by Ettore Sottsass, 1981, plastic laminate, Antique Furniture & Wooden Sculpture Museum, Milan, Italy

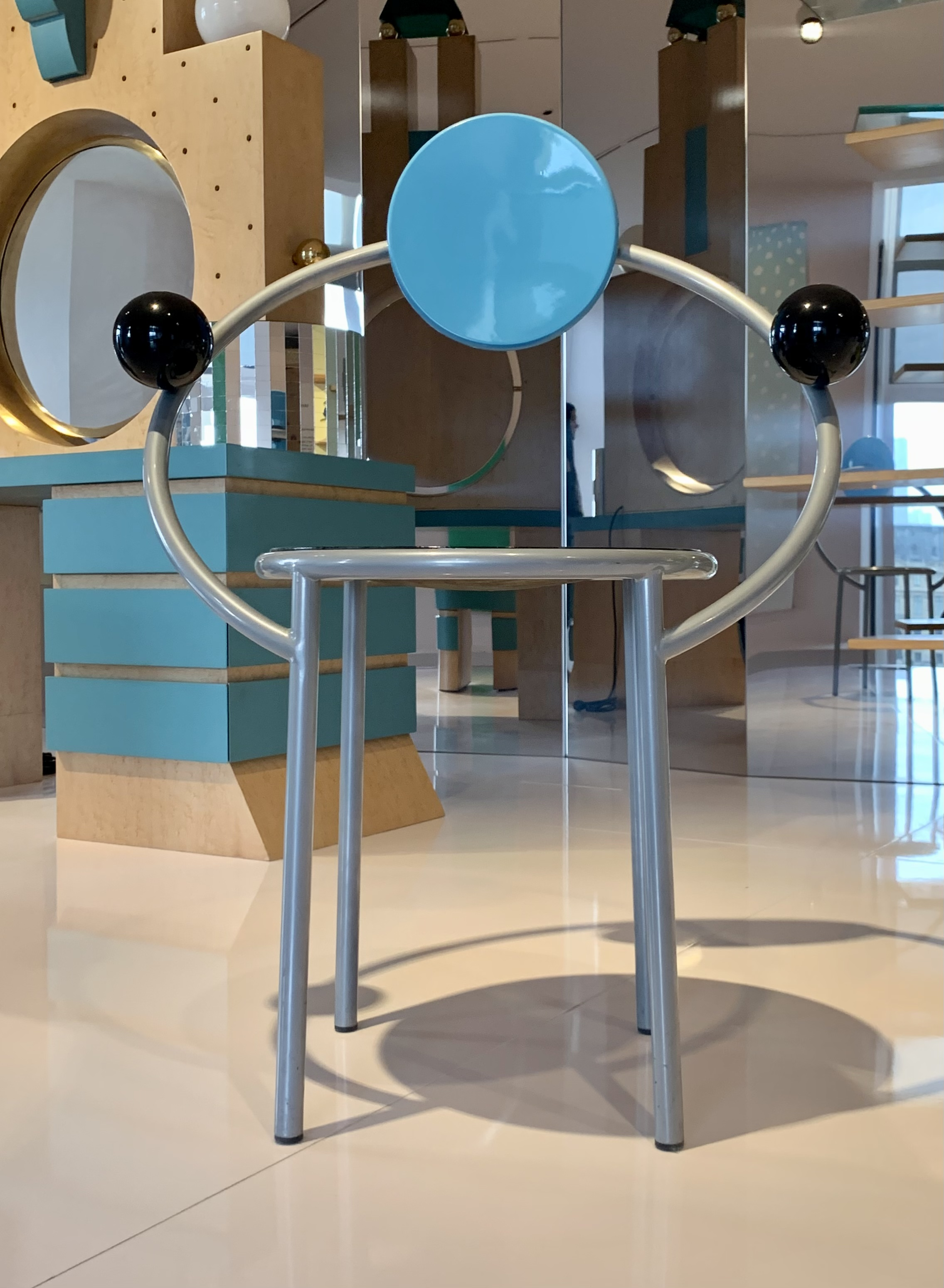
Chair, by Michele de Lucchi, 1983, metal and wood with epoxy lacquer, and plastic, Museum of Decorative Arts, Paris

== See also ==
- Postmodernism – Artistic, cultural, and theoretical movement
- 1980s in fashion
- 1990s in fashion
- Vaporwave – Online musical genre and visual aesthetic
- Global Village Coffeehouse – Design aesthetic
- Y2K aesthetic – Internet aesthetic
- Frutiger Aero – Design style and Internet aesthetic
- Hyperconsumerism – Consumption of goods beyond ones necessities
