= Old Wild West =

Italian restaurant chain

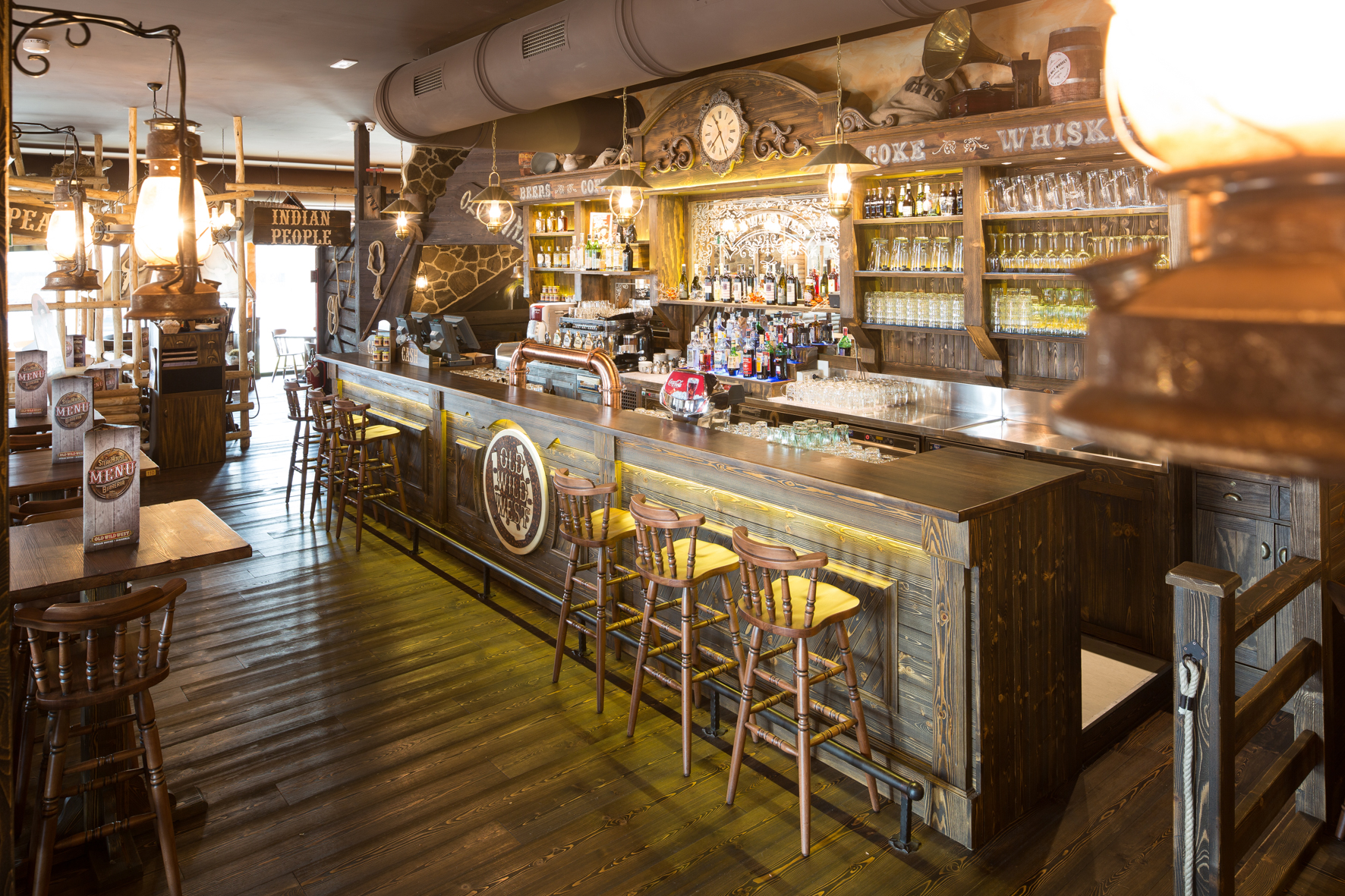
- Interior of an Old Wild West restaurant
- Industry: Restaurant
- Founded: 2002; 24 years ago in Martignacco, Italy
- Founder: Marco Di Giusto
- Headquarters: Tavagnacco, Italy
- Area served: Italy; France; Switzerland; Monaco
- Products: Hamburgers, Tex-Mex cuisine, grilled meat
- Parent: Cigierre (Compagnia Generale Ristorazione S.p.A.)
- Website: www.oldwildwest.it/en

Old Wild West is an Italian restaurant chain specialising in hamburgers, Tex-Mex cuisine and grilled meat. Founded in 2002, the chain is owned by Cigierre (Compagnia Generale Ristorazione S.p.A.) and operates restaurants in Italy, France, Switzerland and Monaco. The company reports operating more than 260 restaurants.

The chain's menus and restaurant interiors are inspired by the American Old West. It has also operated restaurants in Belgium, Croatia, Georgia and Australia.

== History ==
Old Wild West was established in 2002 by Marco Di Giusto, with its first restaurant opening at the Città Fiera shopping centre in Martignacco, near Udine, Italy. The chain began expanding through franchising in 2005, when its first franchised restaurant opened in the Bicocca district of Milan.

The brand belongs to Cigierre, an Italian restaurant group that also operates Wiener Haus, America Graffiti, Pizzikotto, Shi's and Smashie.

=== International expansion ===
In February 2016, Old Wild West expanded into Croatia, opening a restaurant at the Arena Centar shopping centre in Zagreb. The chain had previously expanded into Belgium and Switzerland and operated approximately 130 restaurants at the time.

In June 2016, the chain entered Georgia, opening a restaurant in Tbilisi.

In July 2019, Old Wild West opened its 200th restaurant in Italy.

In September 2019, the chain expanded to Australia, opening a restaurant in the Perth metropolitan area.

=== Awards and advertising ===
In 2018, Old Wild West received the Insegna dell'Anno ("Retail Chain of the Year") award in the table-service restaurant category for the fifth time.

The chain has used several Italian celebrities in its advertising campaigns. Actor and television presenter Ezio Greggio appeared in its advertising in 2014.

In February 2017, actress and television presenter Lodovica Comello became an advertising spokesperson for the chain.

In April 2018, motorcycle racer Andrea Dovizioso and television commentator Mauro Sanchini joined Comello in an advertising campaign broadcast on Sky Sport MotoGP and TV8.

In April 2023, actor Lino Banfi appeared in a television advertising campaign for the chain.

== Sports sponsorship ==
Old Wild West was the title sponsor of the Italian men's Serie A2 and Serie B basketball championships for the 2017–18 and 2018–19 seasons, under an agreement with Lega Nazionale Pallacanestro.

The chain also sponsored Parma Calcio 1913, becoming the club's secondary shirt sponsor for the 2020–21 season after previously sponsoring its youth teams.

In July 2023, Old Wild West became the main shirt sponsor of Palermo FC for the 2023–24 football season.
