= America Graffiti =

Italian restaurant chain

- Interior of an America Graffiti restaurant in Forlì
- Industry: Food service
- Founded: 2008; 18 years ago in Forlì, Italy
- Founder: Riccardo La Corte
- Number of locations: 22 (2026)
- Area served: Italy
- Products: Hamburgers, hot dogs, Tex-Mex cuisine, American-style food
- Parent: Cigierre
- Website: www.americagraffiti.it

America Graffiti is an Italian restaurant chain and restaurant franchise specialising in American cuisine and Tex-Mex food. Founded in 2008 in Forlì, Emilia-Romagna, its restaurants are inspired by the diners and popular culture of the 1950s United States, with interiors featuring vintage American memorabilia, rock and roll imagery and retro furnishings.

The chain has been part of the Italian restaurant group Cigierre since 2017. As of 2026, America Graffiti operated 22 restaurants across Italy.

== History ==
=== Foundation and expansion ===
America Graffiti was founded in 2008 in Forlì by restaurateur Riccardo La Corte, who developed the concept from his interest in American cuisine and the culture of the 1950s. He and his wife, Cinzia Daltri, opened the first restaurant in Via Costanzo II in February of that year.

The business developed two principal restaurant formats: the American Diner, offering table service, and the American Fast Food, designed for quicker meals and counter service. The first fast-food-format restaurant opened in Forlimpopoli in 2010.

The expansion of America Graffiti into a franchising business involved Riccardo La Corte's brother Fabio La Corte, Stefano Landi and other business partners. The franchising network began developing in the early 2010s, with restaurants opening in several Italian regions.

By late 2016, the chain had approximately 60 restaurants in Italy. Its network generated more than €70 million in annual sales and supported approximately 1,500 jobs, including employment associated with its franchised operations.

In December 2016, America Graffiti opened a training and administrative centre alongside its original restaurant in Forlì. The facility included offices, kitchens and spaces for professional training and meetings with franchisees.

=== Awards and acquisition by Cigierre ===
In May 2017, America Graffiti received the Best Format award at the Foodservice Award Italy, an industry event held in Milan.

On 25 October 2017, the Italian restaurant group Cigierre, controlled by the private equity firm BC Partners, reached an agreement to acquire America Graffiti Franchising S.r.l. The acquisition, valued at approximately €35 million, was expected to be completed by the end of November 2017. At the time, America Graffiti had a network of 63 restaurants and fast-food outlets.

The acquisition incorporated America Graffiti into Cigierre's restaurant portfolio alongside brands such as Old Wild West, Wiener Haus and Shi's.

=== Recent developments ===
On 1 January 2024, America Graffiti S.r.l., then a wholly owned subsidiary, was merged into Cigierre – Compagnia Generale Ristorazione S.p.A. The America Graffiti restaurant brand continued to operate under the ownership of Cigierre.

In December 2025, two restaurants associated with the chain's original founder, Riccardo La Corte, closed in the Forlì area. The closures affected the historic restaurant in Forlimpopoli and the location at the Punta di Ferro shopping centre in Forlì. La Corte attributed the closures to the expiration of the premises' leases and the terms proposed for renewal. Another America Graffiti restaurant in Via Costanzo II remained in operation under different management.

As of November 2026, America Graffiti's official website listed 22 restaurants in Italy.

== Restaurants and menu ==
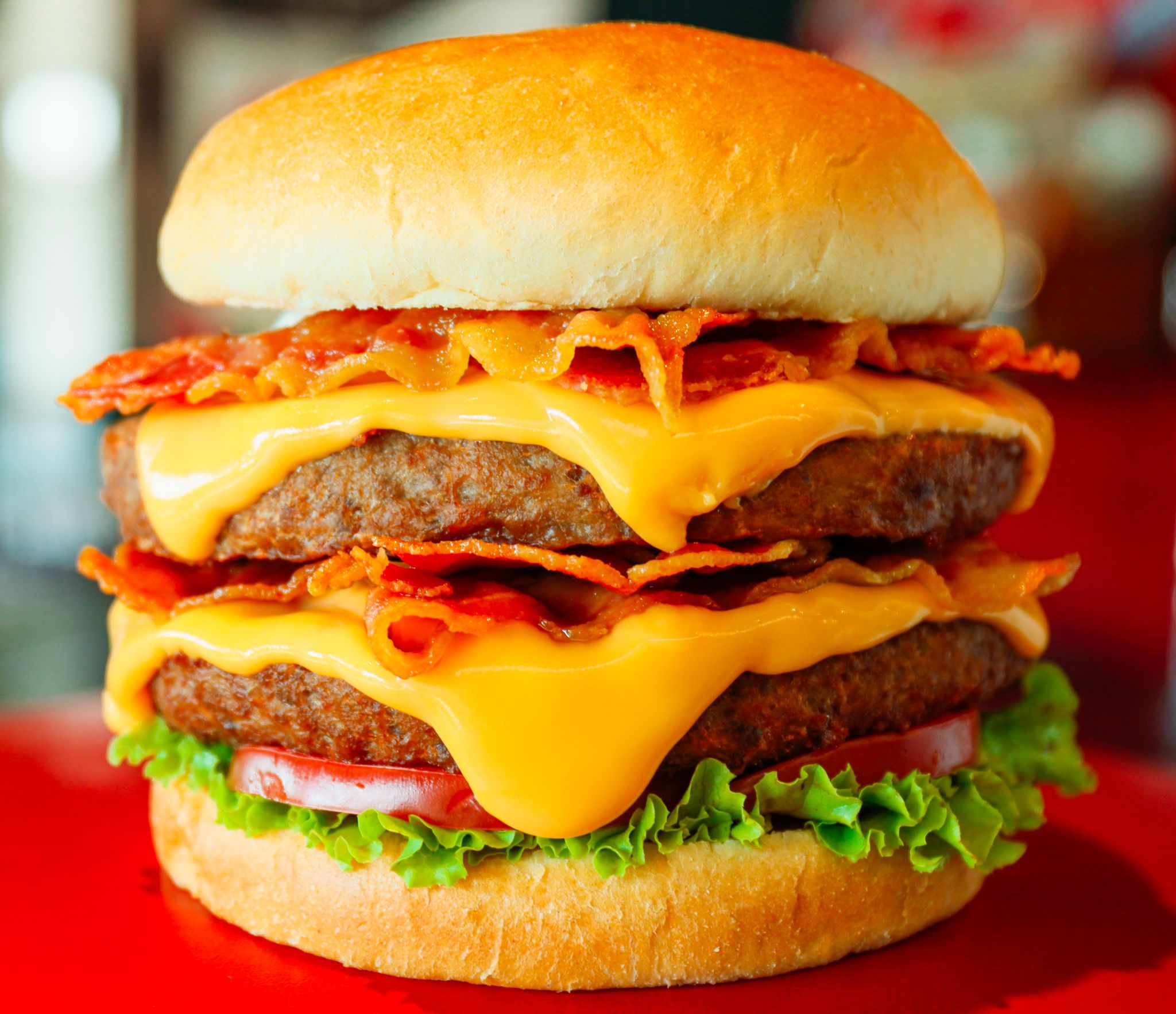
A Double Double Burger served at America Graffiti

America Graffiti's restaurants are modelled on mid-20th-century American diners. Their interiors commonly feature neon signs, vintage automobile licence plates, petrol pump decorations, pinball machines, jukeboxes and references to American cinema and rock and roll music. Other design features include black-and-white chequered floors, red seating and decorations inspired by muscle cars and drive-in restaurants.

The chain's menu is primarily inspired by American cuisine and includes grilled meats, hamburgers, hot dogs, finger food, nachos and other Tex-Mex specialities. It also offers pasta prepared in Italian-American styles and dishes associated with American brunch.

Desserts include brownies, cookies, doughnuts, cheesecake and apple pie, alongside American-style milkshakes and pancakes. The chain also offers vegetarian and vegan dishes, with gluten-free options available at certain locations.

== Gallery ==
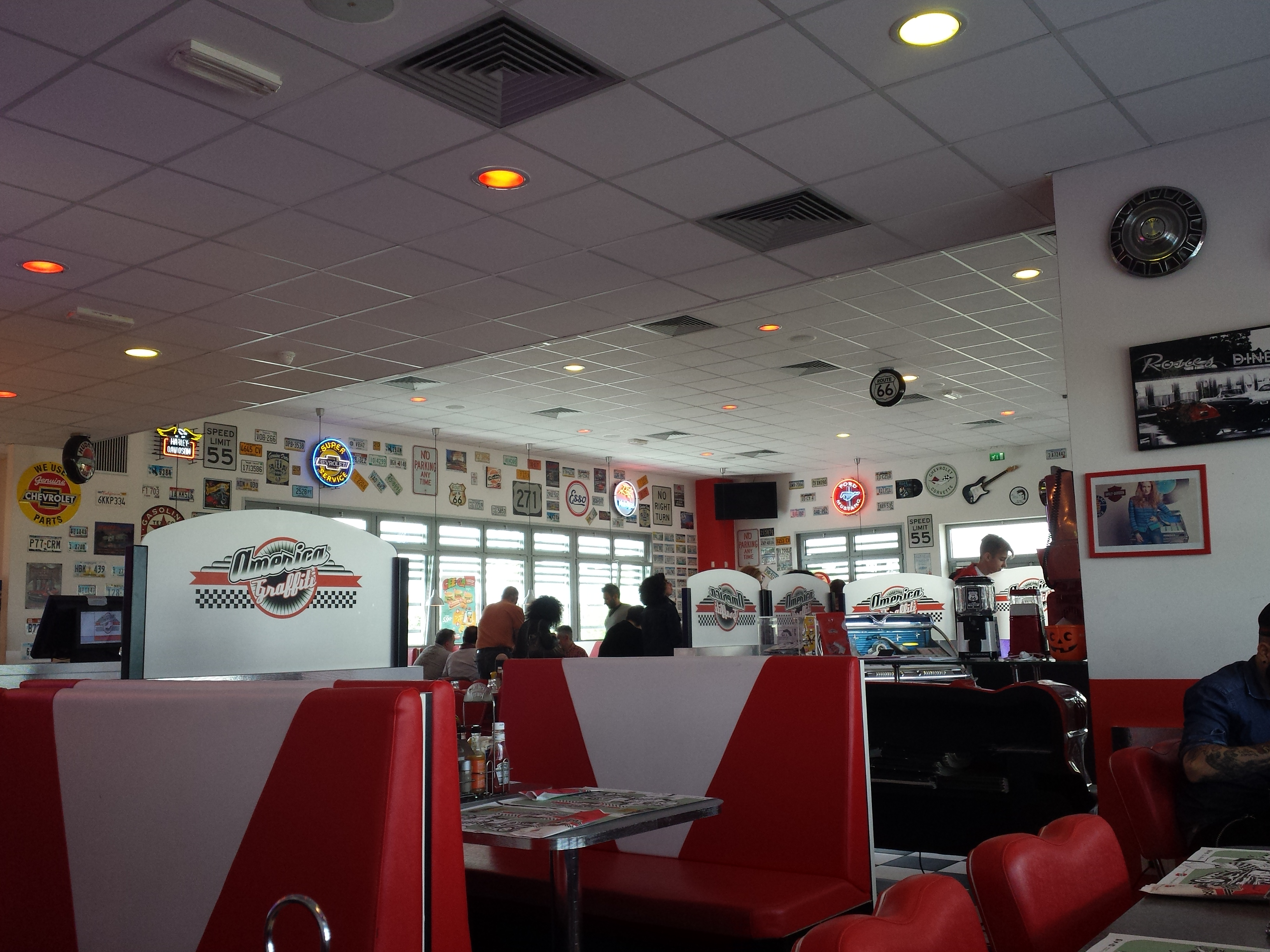
Interior of an America Graffiti restaurant in Castel Maggiore, near Bologna

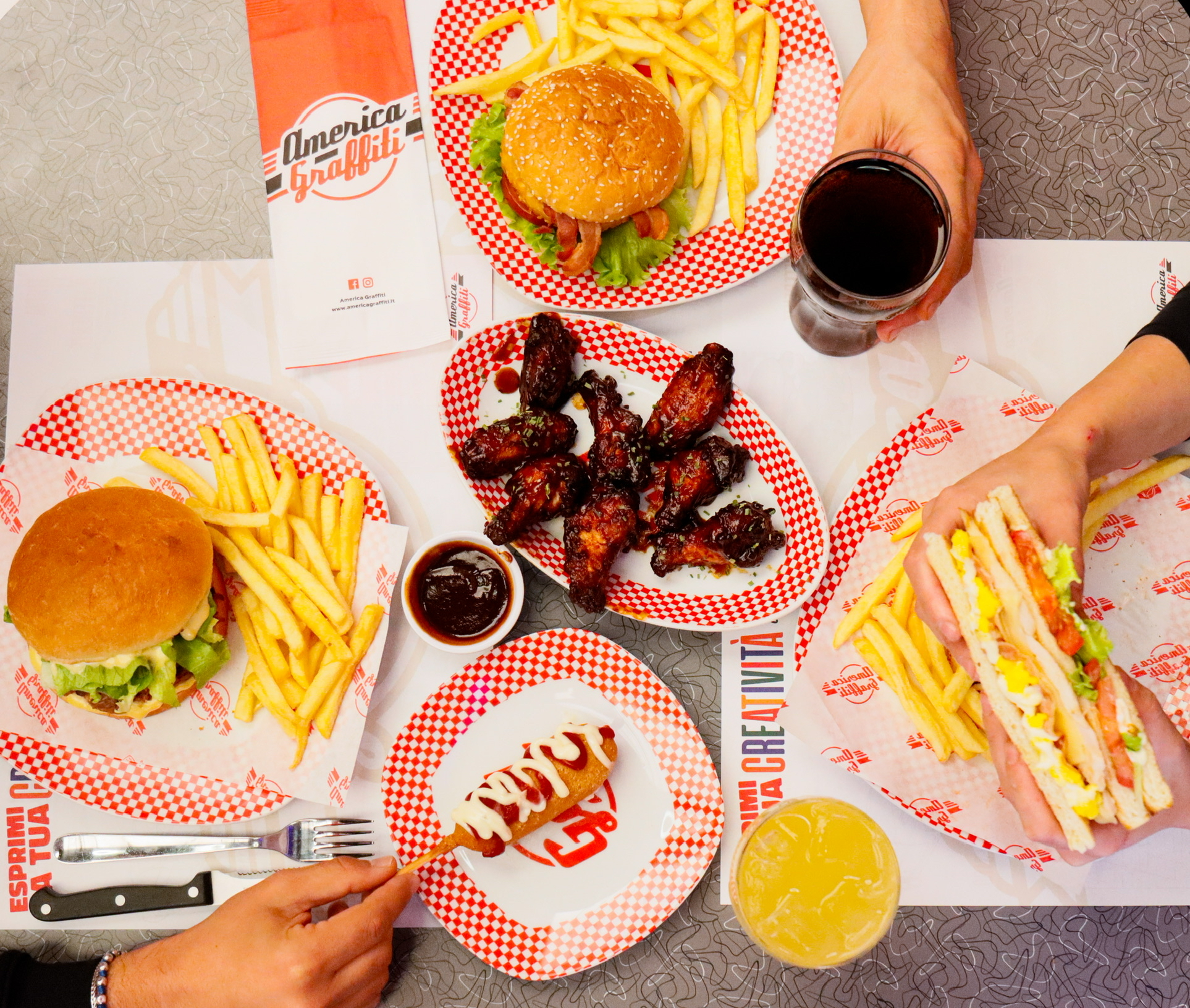
American-style food served at America Graffiti

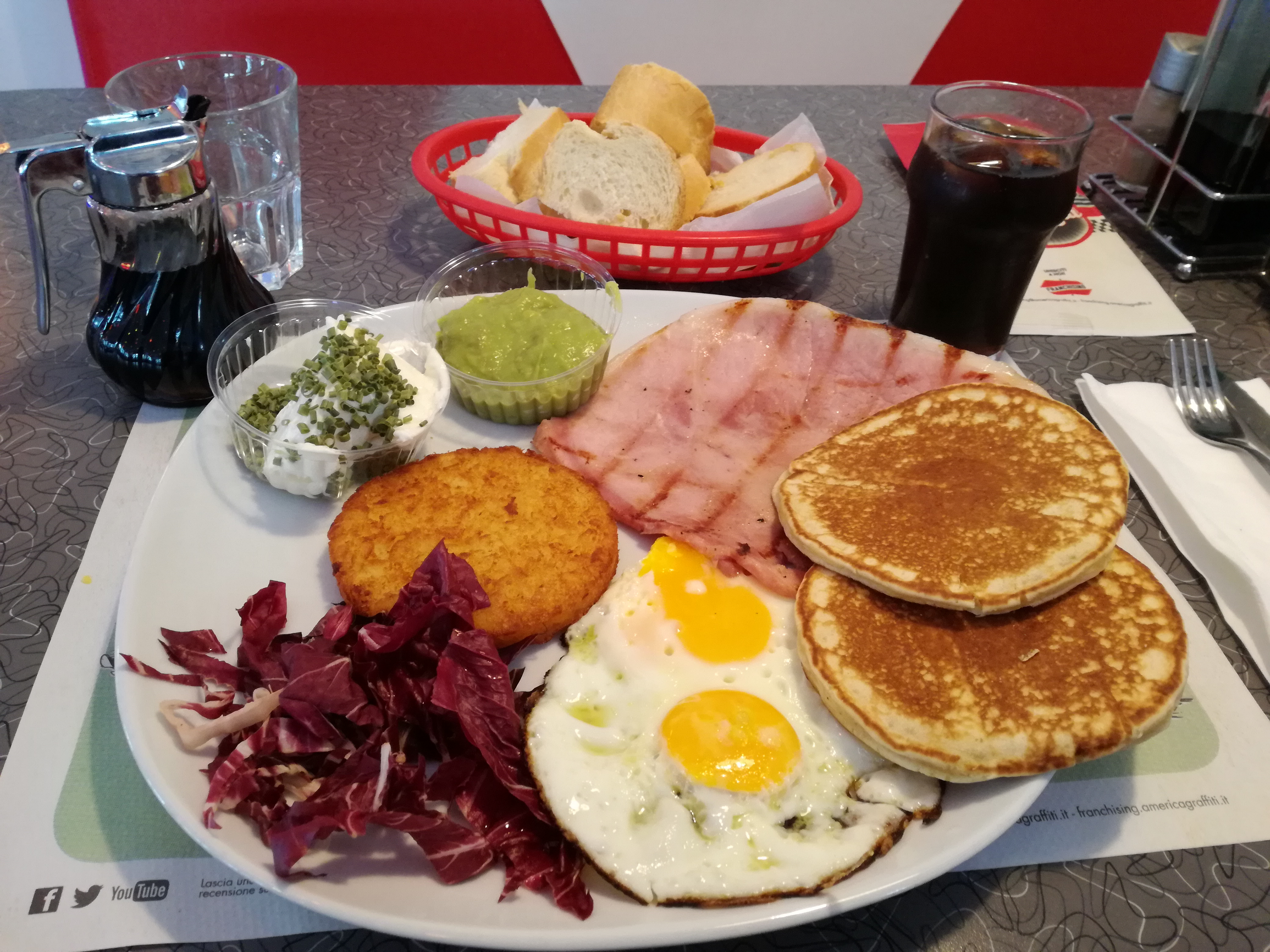
Brunch dishes

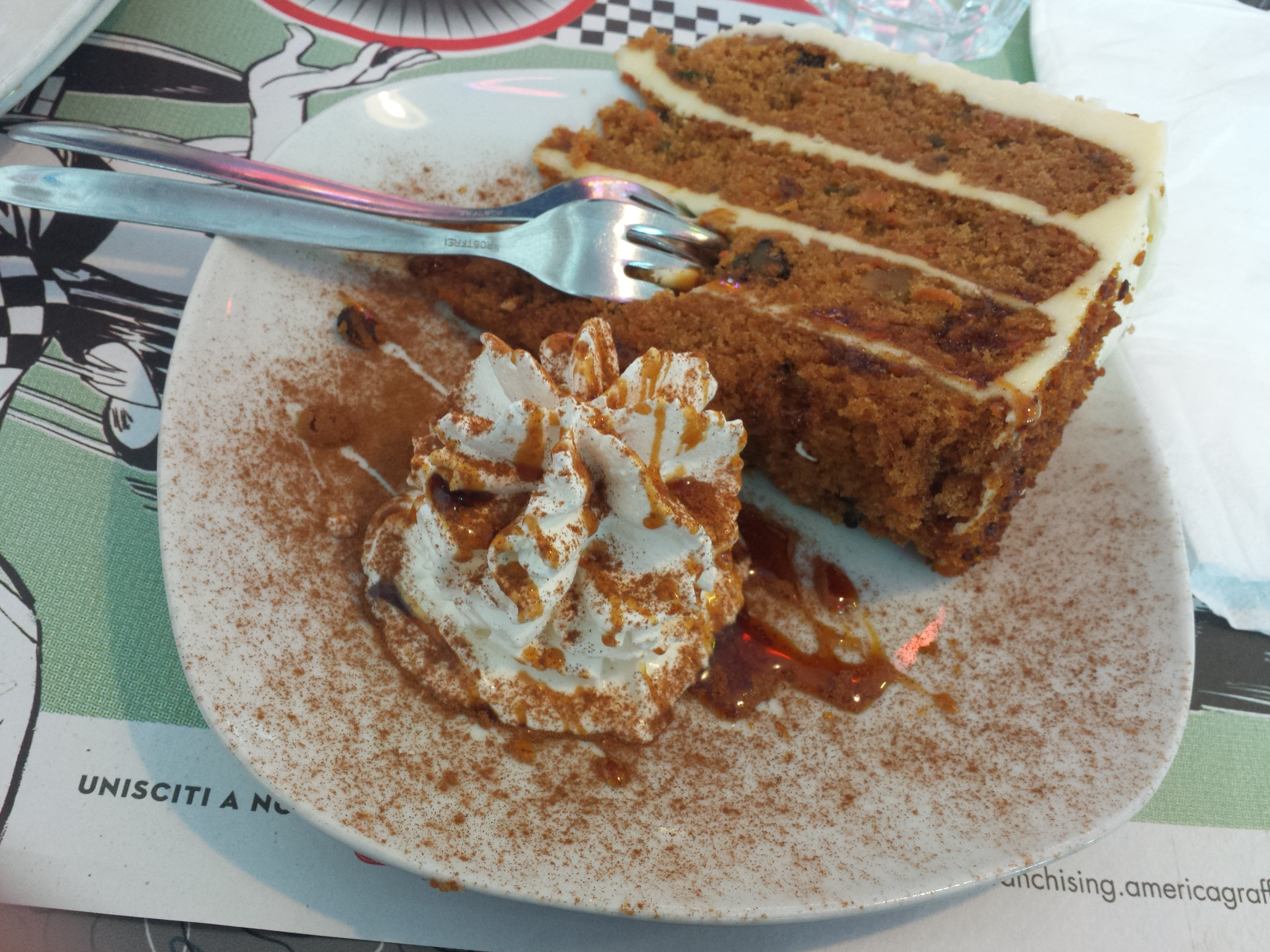
Carrot cake

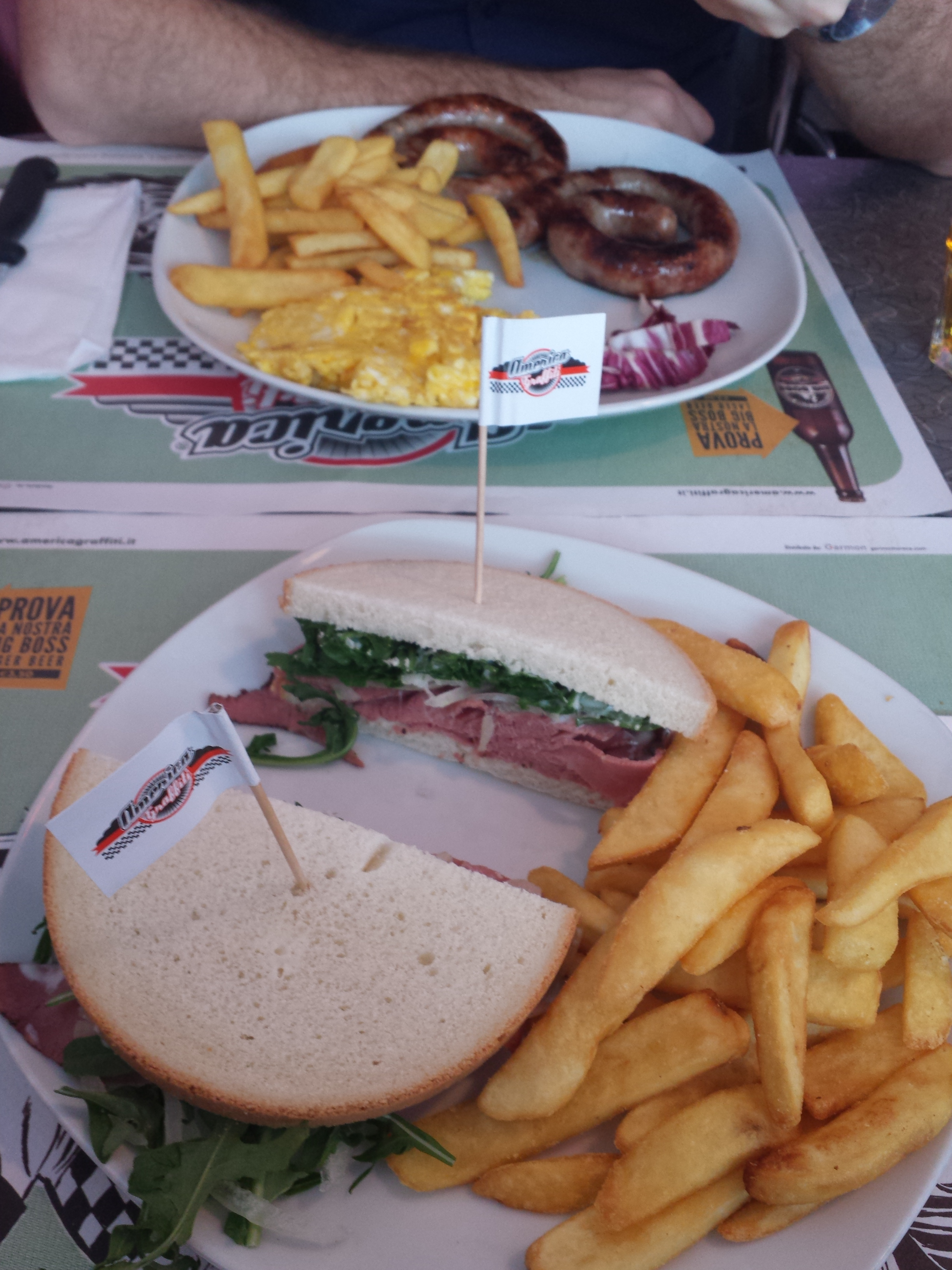
Fast-food dishes

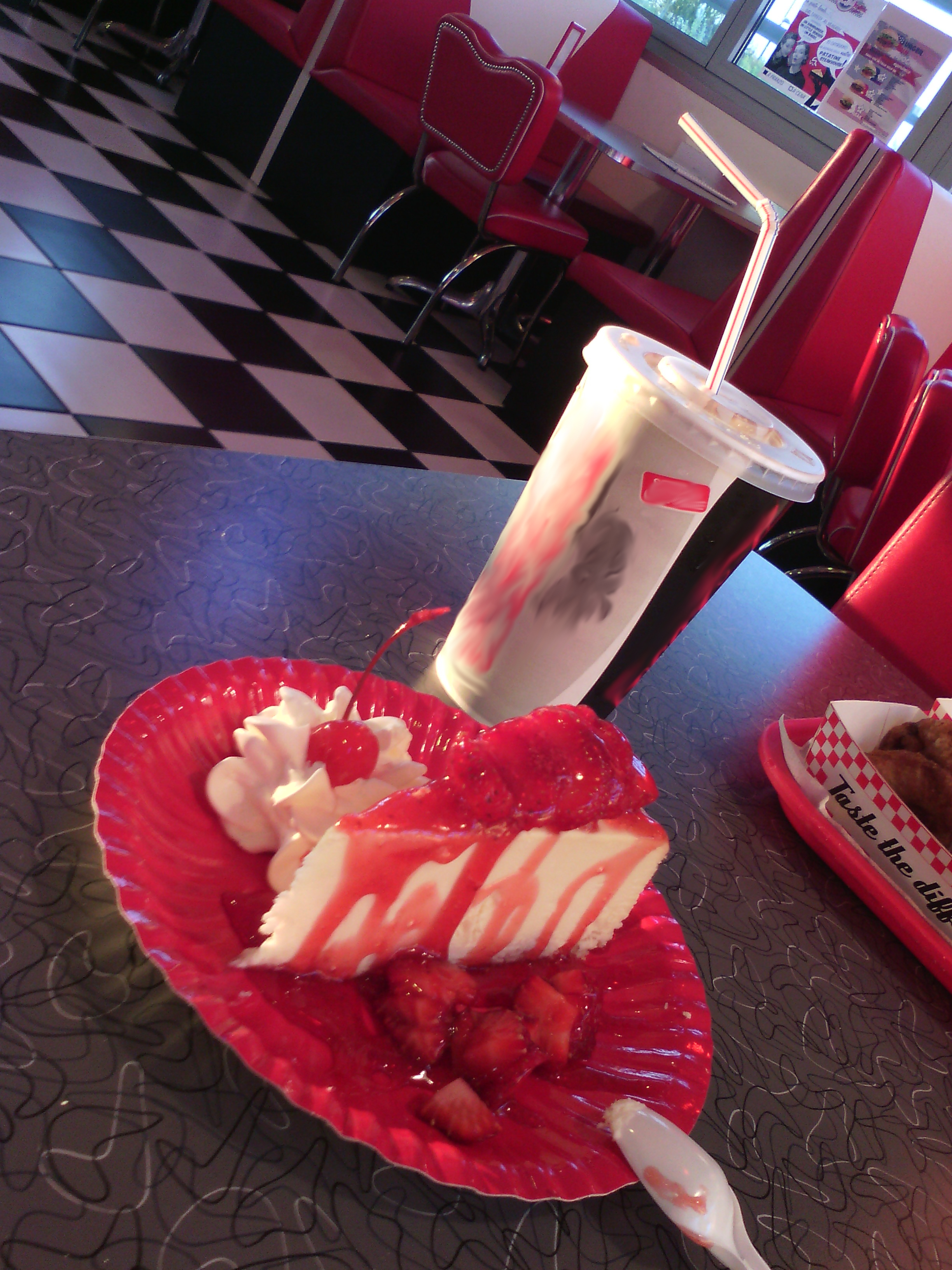
Cheesecake

== See also ==
- Cigierre
- Old Wild West
- Diner
- American cuisine
