= Barbara Radice =

Italian design critic, writer, and editor

Barbara Radice (born 29 November 1943) is an Italian design critic, writer, and editor.

== Early life and education ==
Barbara Radice was born in Como, Italy, and graduated from the Catholic University of Milan in 1968.

== Career ==
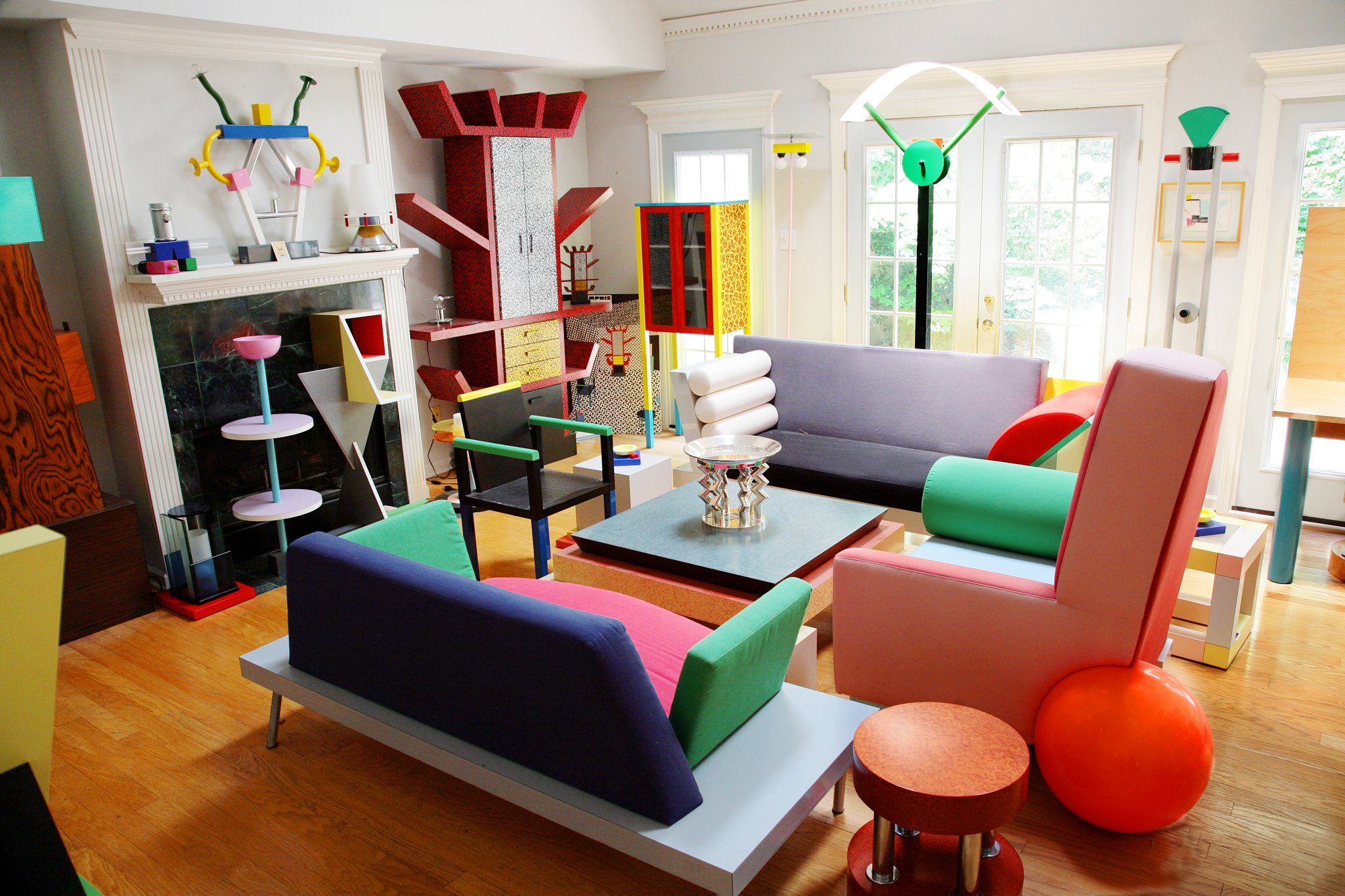
Memphis Group furniture

Radice is one of the seven founding members of the Memphis Group, and the only non-architect among them. The Italian postmodern design collective was formed during a gathering at her home in Milan in December 1980.

In her critical writing, Radice defined the themes and theories of this new aesthetic movement, and would become the group's de facto historian and chronicler. In 1984 she published Memphis: Research, Experiences, Results, Failures and Successes of New Design, a manifesto for the group's design philosophy. In it she focused on the broad output of the group's designers, from laminates and glass designs by Ettore Sottsass to patterned fabrics by Nathalie du Pasquier and ceramics by Matteo Thun.

Radice served as editor of the design and architecture magazine Terrazzo (published from 1988 to 1997) which she began in collaboration with Ettore Sottsass. The publication's name has a double meaning: it is both the Italian word for "terrace" (in Radice's version, a "place of encounter") and a reference to the popular style of flooring known by that name.

Radice is also Sottsass's biographer and widow, and is involved in preserving his legacy and that of the Memphis Group. She curated the 2017 exhibit "Ettore Sottsass – There Is a Planet" for the 2017 Milan Triennial.

In 2018, Radice came into conflict with the Stedelijk Museum in Amsterdam over a retrospective of Sottsass's work. The museum claimed that the estate was too controlling and released a statement describing being given "too little scope for interpretations we wished to explore in the presentation." Radice and the estate's gallery owner Ernest Mourmans turned the blame on the institution, suggesting that the curatorial team was "adversarial", and refused to loan objects for the show. The differences could not be resolved and the show was ultimately cancelled.

== Publications ==
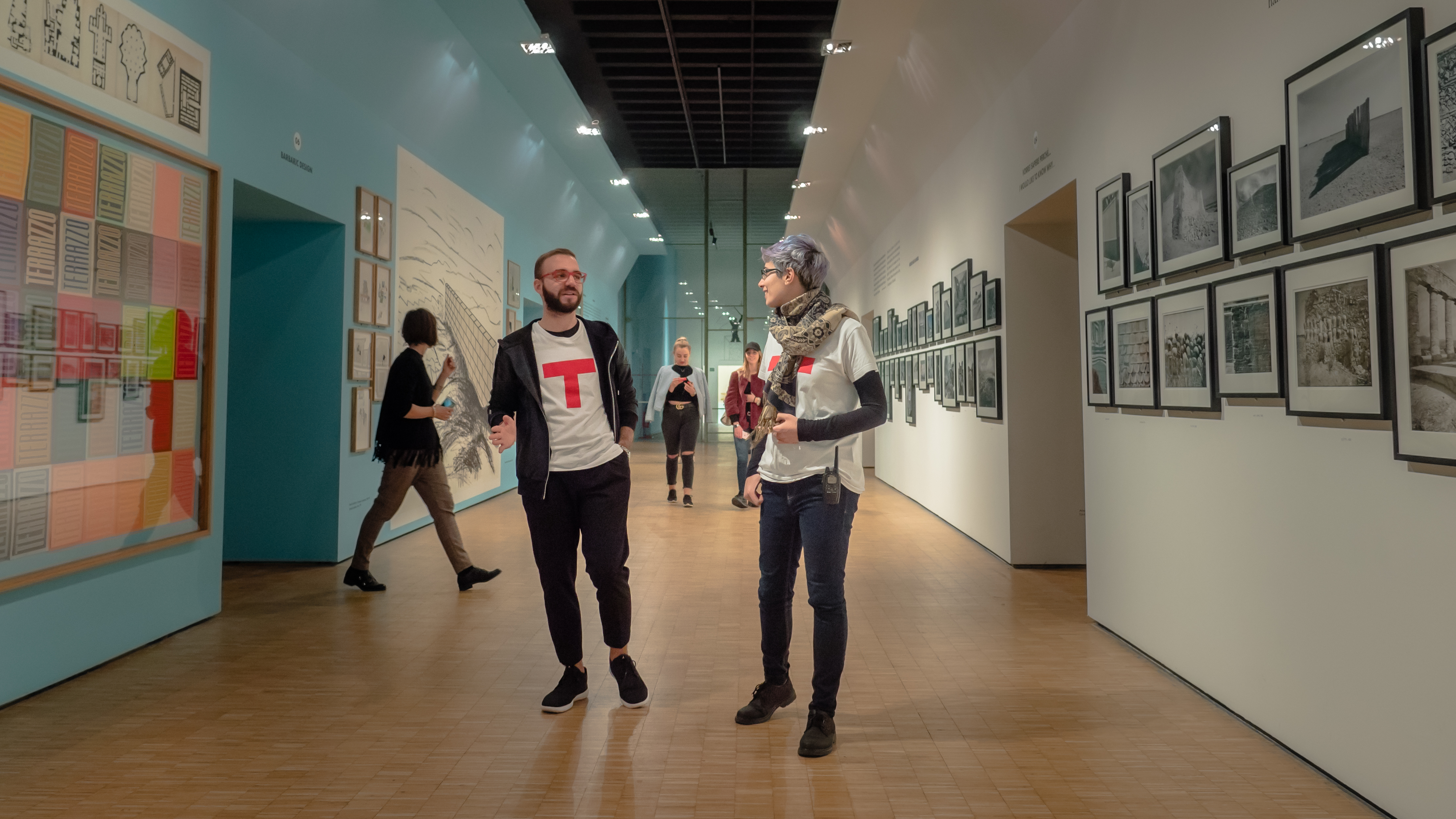
Exhibition view of "Ettore Sottsass – There is a Planet", curated by Barbara Radice for the Milan Triennial in 2017.

- Elogio del banale, Torino. Studio forma, Torino & Alchymia, Milano, 1980.
- Memphis: Research, Experiences, Results, Failures and Successes of New Design. Rizzoli, 1984
- Jewelry By Architects. Electa, Milan, 1987.
- Ettore Sottsass: A Critical Biography, Thames & Hudson. 1993
- Ettore Sottsass: Scritti. Neri Pozza Editore, Milan, 2002 (edited with M. Carboni)
- Metafore. Skirà Editore, Milan, 2002 (edited with M. Carboni)
- Memphis: The New International Style. Mondadori Electa, Milan, 2008.
- Ettore Sottsass: There is a Planet. Catalogue for exhibition at Triennale Design Museum, Electa, 2016

== Personal life ==
Barbara Radice was married to fellow Memphis member and designer Ettore Sottsass until his death in 2007. The couple met in 1976 at the Venice Biennale.
