= Vigiljoch =

Mountain in Italy

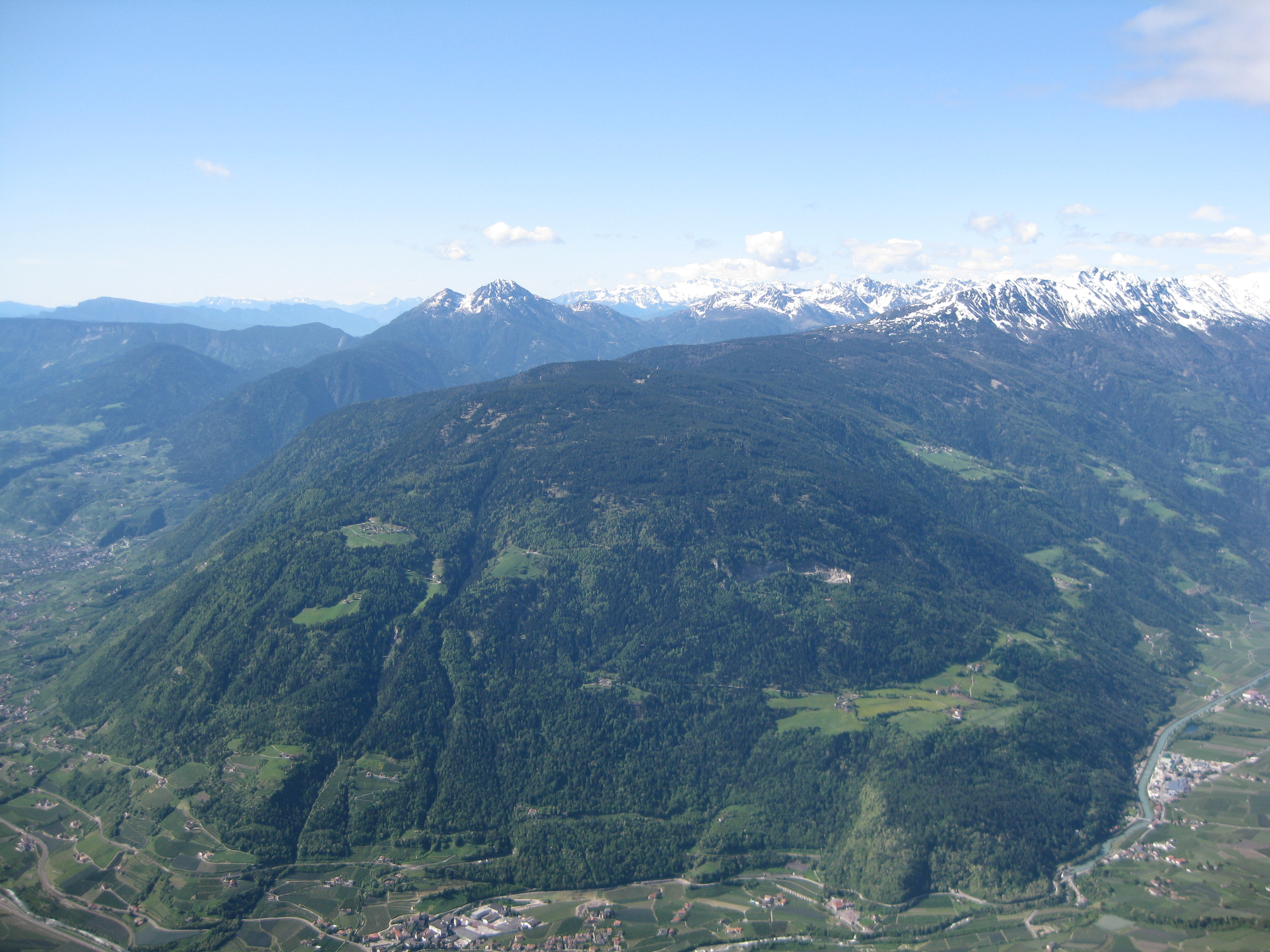

Highest point
- Elevation: 1,906 m (6,253 ft)
- Coordinates: 46°38′50.5″N 11°6′1″E

Geography
- Location: South Tyrol, Italy

The Vigiljoch (Italian: Monte San Vigilio) is a mountain pass (also standing for the nearby mountain) near Lana in South Tyrol, Italy. The pass is at elevation 1,743 m, whereas the nearby summits northeast of the pass (Larchbichl, Bischofskofel, Marlinger Joch) are insignificantly higher.
