= Zucchetti =

Italian business

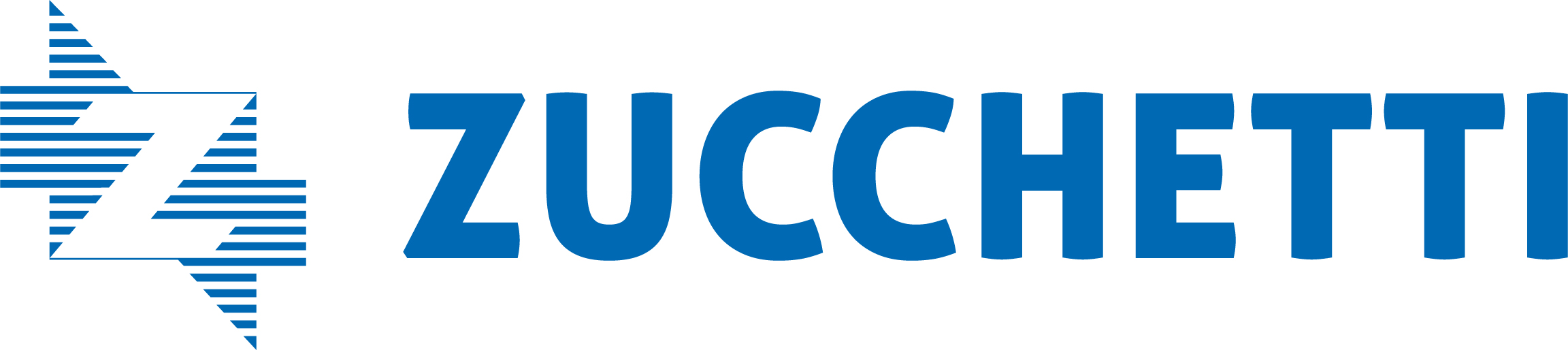
Zucchetti logo

Zucchetti (pronounced [dzukˈketti; tsuk-]) is an Italian software company with a focus on the banking and insurance industries.

== History ==
In 1977 Zucchetti Chartered accountant produced the first software in Italy for the automatic processing of tax returns. The software immediately became a product to be commercialized in Italy.

Then in 1978, Zucchetti was founded: a company to manage orders, sales and assistance services to all the chartered accountants who use accounting and tax solutions.

In 1983 the process of business diversification began with the development of other software solutions: Payroll, Time and Attendance, and the first management programs for companies.

Straddling the 1980s and 1990s, through the acquisition of IT companies, the Zucchetti Group was founded. The company from Lodi extended its presence in different trades: ERP systems, access control, industrial automation, and robotics.

In 2008 the founder Domenico Zucchetti decided to step down in favour of his son Alessandro and his daughter Cristina.

The worldwide business transactions began and in a short time Zucchetti had a direct presence in France, Germany, Romania, Brazil and U.S.A.

Zucchetti Group closed 2015 with €386 mln turnover, more than 105.000 active clients, 1.100 partners who sell its solutions, 200 of which are outside Italy

Starting from January 2019, Zucchetti reinforced its presence abroad, with all TCPOS subsidiaries becoming direct Zucchetti's offices in Austria, Bulgaria, France, Germany, Mexico and Switzerland.

== Products ==
Zucchetti produces management and tax solutions for companies, professionals and trade associations about:

- Management activities and ERP;
- Document Management;
- Business Intelligence;
- Personnel and HR Management in big companies;
- Payroll Management and Payroll outsourcing;
- Safety at work;
- Digital storage;
- Attendance, access control and video surveillance (hardware and software);
- Data center;
- Accounting and tax software;
- Collaborative portal;
- Organisation and management of individual professional activities and professional consultancy;
- Software for laws firms;
- Management of bankruptcy procedures, revocations and compound interests.

In addition, Zucchetti also produces complementary services for:

- Projects development – System integration;
- Editorial and informative online services (Company's Certificate issued by the Chamber of Commerce);
- Management control;
- Digital printing and online outsourced mailing.
- Telematics, M2M, Internet of Things, satellite geolocalization, management and control of the corporate fleet.

== Locations ==
The Headquarters are located in Lodi, Via Solferino 1. In Italy, Zucchetti has offices also in Ancona, Arezzo, Aulla (MS), Bergamo, Bologna, Brescia, Erba (CO), Florence, Genoa, Gravina in Puglia (BA), Milan, Modena, Naples, Padua, Parma, Piacenza, Reggio Emilia, Rimini, Rome, Rovigo, Verona, Vicenza and Udine.

Internationally, the company has offices in Brazil, China, France, Germany, Romania, Spain, Switzerland and the USA.

== Bibliography ==
- "Numeri uno", Mauro Castelli, Il Sole 24 Ore, 2002
- "L'impresa Nuova. Una saga avvincente per imprenditori, manager e curiosi.", Spirali, 2004
- "Zucchetti avanti tutta", Datamanager, giugno 2015
- "Zucchetti con i partner in direzione grandi aziende", Channelcity, maggio 2016
