= UFO (Florence) =

Former architectural group in Florence, Italy

UFO was a design and architectural group founded in Florence, Italy, active between 1967 – 1978. A major part of the Radical architecture and design movement of the late 1960s, they studied under Umberto Eco at the University of Florence. Fellow alumni included the founders of Superstudio and Archizoom Associati.

UFO was founded in the lead up to the 1968 movement in Italy in which students of working backgrounds tried to change Italy's traditional capitalist and patriarchal society through direct action, such as occupying universities. Amongst this period of social upheaval, UFO aimed to drive social change through architecture and ‘transform the practice of architecture into an event itself’ (Gianni Pettena). Their occupation of the Architectural Department at Florence University, beginning in February 1968, was more than political. The faculty provided a workshop for prototypes of objects that the group deployed onto the streets of Florence, as well as exchanging ideas with fellow students.

== Founders and Members ==
UFO was founded in 1967 by Carlo Bachi, Lapo Binazzi, Patrizia Cammeo, Riccardo Foresi and Titti Maschietto. Initially, Sandro Gioli was also a member, and Massimo Giovannini, Mario Spinella, Rodolfo Bracci and Claudio Greppi were also temporary members. UFO's name, Unidentified Flying Object, was intended to reflect their anonymous and 'open structure'.

== Career ==
Dissatisfied by the limitations and ineffectiveness of post-war modern design, radical architects sought to use their profession as a tool for societal change and to challenge the idea of architects’ role in society. UFO's works include Urboeffimeri (1968), La Lampada Dollaro (1969), Case ANAS (1969–1973) and Il Giro d'Italia (1972).

Nightclubs, as a new type of space for multidisciplinary experimentation and creative liberation, and symbols of resistance to Italy’s patriarchal society, became ideal platforms in which to develop Radical architecture’s concepts.Wayback Machine Build, baby, build: when radical architects did disco

UFO’s main work in this space was at the Bamba Issa in Forte Dei Marmi, in the years between 1969 – 1971.

UFO were among the founders of Global Tools, a network of designers and architects similar to the Arts & Crafts movement founded to promote and share alternative design and art ideas.

The initiative was launched in the editorial office of Casabella magazine in January 1973. In addition to UFO, and other radical architecture groups Archizoom, Gruppo 9999 and Superstudio, the founding members were individual designers such as Ettore Sottsass and Gaetano Pesce. The magazines Casabella and Rassegna also joined.

Their last performative work was at the 1978 Venice Biennale, Performance in Barca (1978).

== Exhibitions ==
Since the early 2010s, UFO’s legacy in Radical architecture, and the movement’s influence on design, architecture and culture, has been explored in several international exhibitions: at the Vitra Design Museum, the ICA in London, Palazzo Strozzi in Florence, the Frac in Orléans, the Centro Pecci, host to Gruppo UFO’s first solo exhibition, UFO STORY, in 2012, and again as part of a wider exhibition on radical architecture in 2021.
