= Ettore Sottsass =

Italian architect and designer (1917–2007)

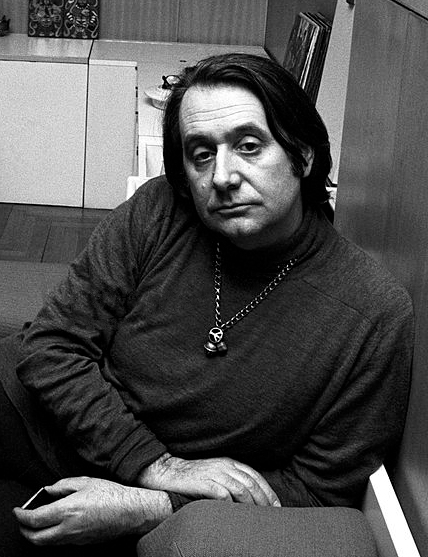
- Sottsass in 1969
- Born: 14 September 1917; Innsbruck, Austria-Hungary
- Died: 31 December 2007 (aged 90); Milan, Italy
- Occupation: Architect
- Spouse(s): Fernanda Pivano (m. 1949; div. 1970) Barbara Radice (m. 1976)
- Awards: Compasso d'Oro; Sir Misha Black Medal
- Practice: Sottsass Associati
- Buildings: Mayer-Schwarz Gallery, Beverly Hills, California

Ettore Sottsass (Italian pronunciation: [ˈɛttore sotˈtsas]; 14 September 1917 – 31 December 2007) was an Italian architect and product designer. He was known for his designs of furniture, jewellery, glass, lighting, homeware and office supplies, and also worked on numerous buildings and interiors, often defined by bold colours.

== Early life ==
Sottsass was born in Innsbruck, Austria, and grew up in Turin, where his father, also named Ettore Sottsass, was an architect. His father belonged to the modernist architecture group Movimento Italiano per l'Architettura Razionale (MIAR), led by Giuseppe Pagano.

Sottsass attended the Politecnico di Torino in Turin and graduated in 1939 with a degree in architecture.

After the Allies reached Italy, Sottsass joined the Italian Republican Fascist Party and enlisted in the Monterosa Division of the Repubblica Sociale Italiana, led by Benito Mussolini, to fight in the mountains alongside German forces. He later recounted his experiences as a lieutenant in the Monterosa Division in his autobiography Scritto di notte, published by Adelphi.

After his time in the military, Sottsass opened his own architecture and design firm in Milan. He began designing furniture and experimenting with different colours, patterns and shapes. His work was often associated with pop culture through his brightly coloured, whimsical objects, many of which were made from glass and ceramic.

== Early career ==
After returning home, Sottsass worked as an architect with his father, often on new modernist versions of buildings that had been destroyed during the war. In 1947, living in Milan, he set up his own architectural and industrial design studio, where he began to create work in a variety of media, including ceramic, painting, sculpture, furniture, photography, jewellery, architecture and interior design.

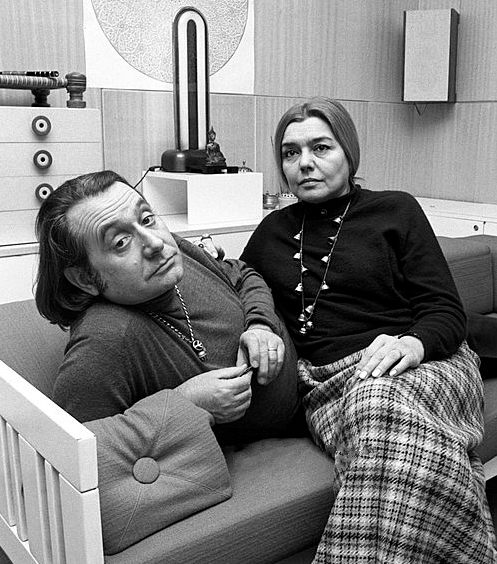
Ettore Sottsass and Fernanda Pivano at their home in Milan in 1969

In 1949, Sottsass married Fernanda Pivano, a writer, journalist, translator and critic. From 1954 to 1957, he was a member of the International Movement for an Imaginist Bauhaus, resigning due to the movement's perceived aggression and its lack of professionalism.

In 1956, Sottsass travelled to New York City and began working in the office of George Nelson. He and Pivano travelled widely while working for Nelson, and returned to Italy after a few months. During the same year, Sottsass was commissioned by the American entrepreneur Irving Richards for an exhibition of his ceramics.

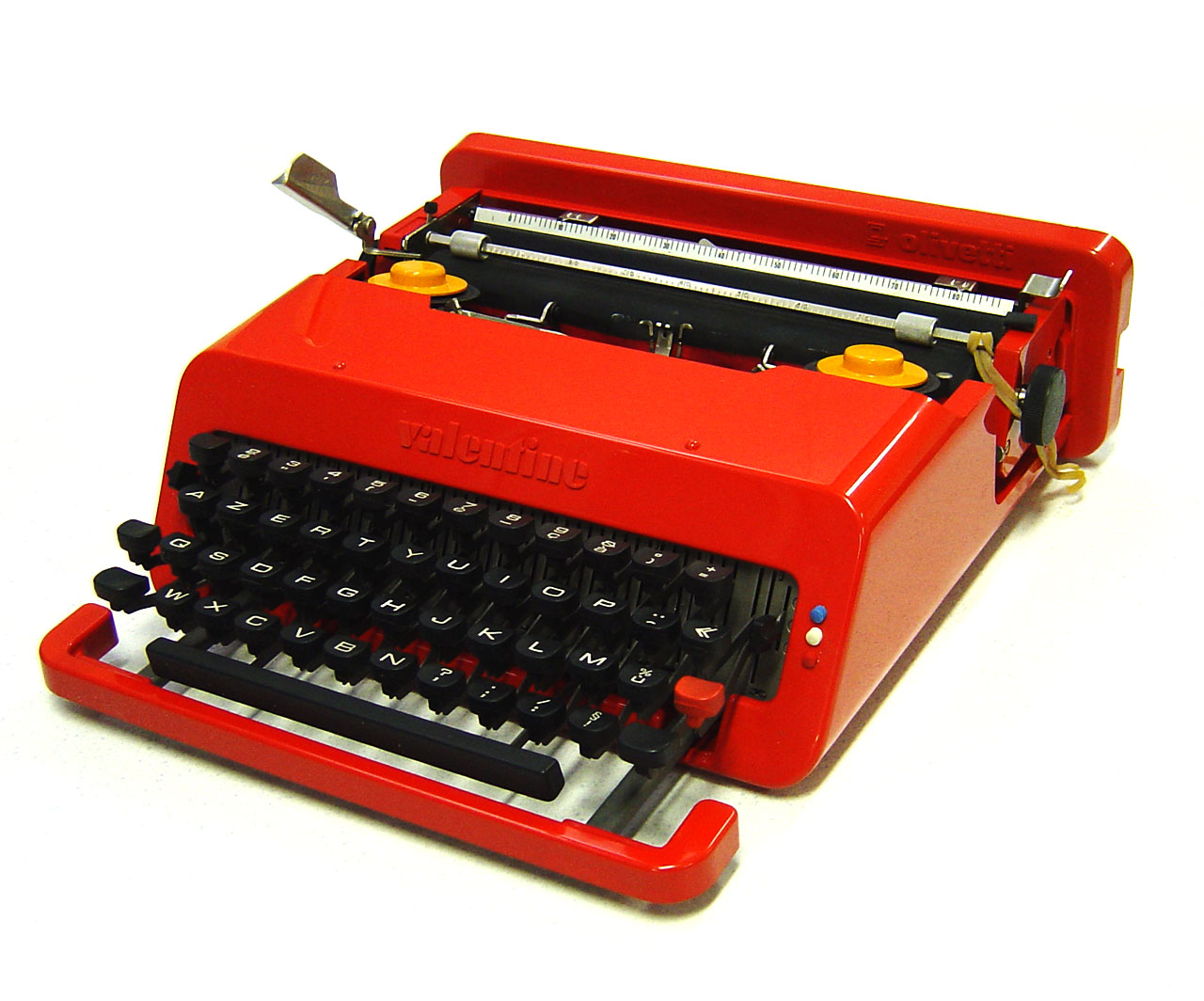
Olivetti Valentine typewriter (1969)

Back in Italy in 1957, Sottsass joined Poltronova, a semi-industrial producer of contemporary furniture, as an artistic consultant. Much of the furniture he worked on there influenced the designs he would later create with Memphis Milano.

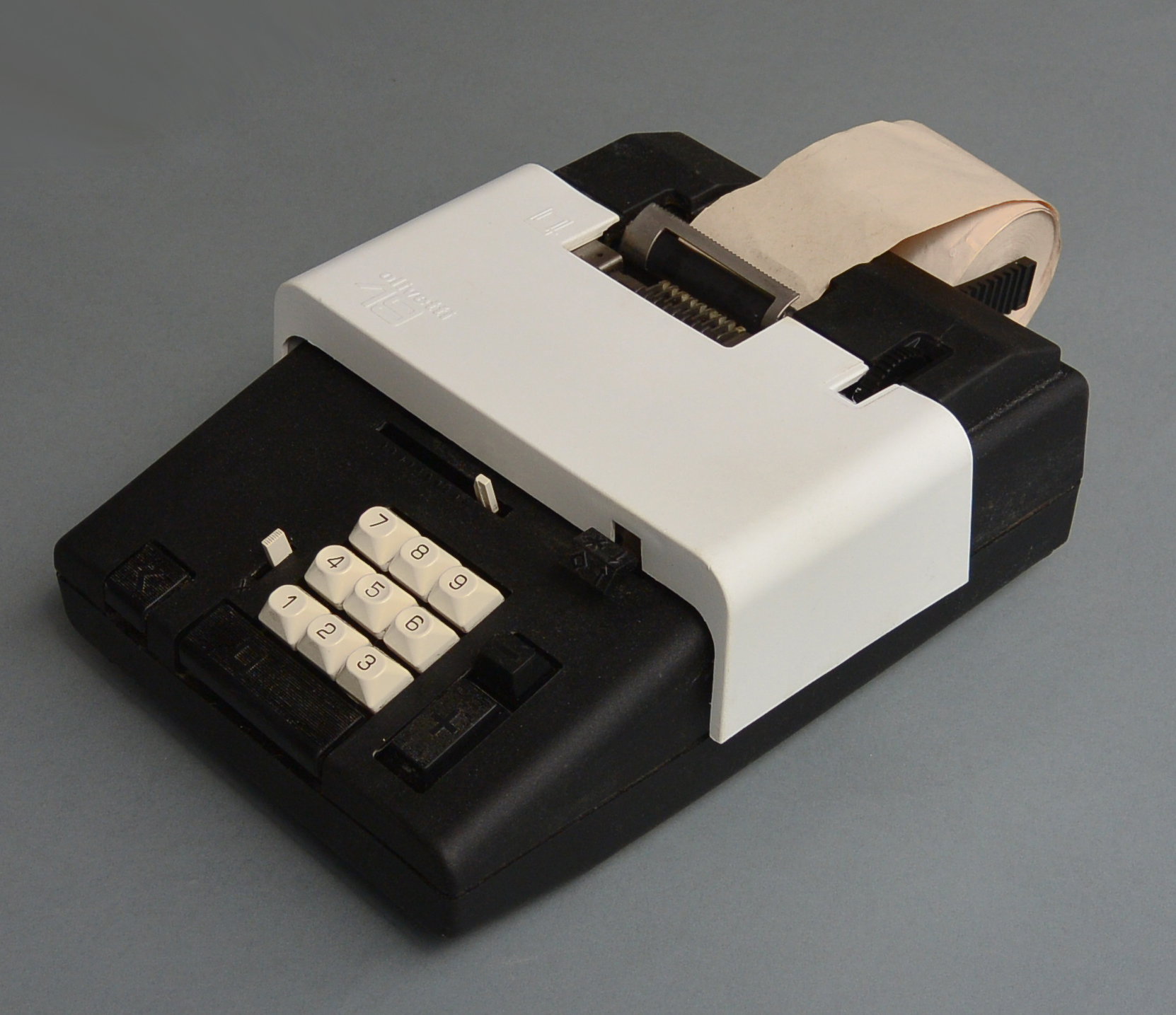
Olivetti Summa 19 calculator (1969)

In 1956, Sottsass was hired by Adriano Olivetti as a design consultant for Olivetti, to design electronic devices and develop the first Italian mainframe computer, the Elea 9003, for which he was awarded the Compasso d'Oro in 1959. His design for the MC 19 electric adding machine (with Hans von Klier) was awarded the Compasso d'Oro in 1970. At Olivetti, he also designed office equipment, typewriters and furniture, including the Synthesis 45 office chair. Through colour, form and styling, Sottsass brought office equipment into the realm of popular culture. His first typewriters, the Tekne 3 and the Praxis 48, were characterised by their sobriety and angularity. With Perry A. King, Sottsass created the Valentine typewriter in 1969, considered a milestone in 20th-century design and featured in the Museum of Modern Art, Cooper Hewitt, Smithsonian Design Museum, London's Design Museum and the Victoria and Albert Museum.

While continuing to design for Olivetti in the 1960s, Sottsass developed a range of objects reflecting his personal experiences travelling in the United States and India. These included large altar-like ceramic sculptures and his "Superboxes", radical sculptural gestures presented as consumer products and conceptual statements. Covered in bold and colourful simulated custom laminates, they were precursors to Memphis, a movement which came more than a decade later. Around this time, Sottsass said: "I didn't want to do any more consumerist products, because it was clear that the consumerist attitude was quite dangerous." His work from the late 1960s to the 1970s was defined by experimental collaborations with younger designers such as Superstudio and Archizoom Associati, and association with the Radical movement, culminating in the foundation of Memphis at the turn of the decade.

In the early 1970s, he designed the modular office equipment collection Synthesis 45.

Sottsass and Fernanda Pivano divorced in 1970. In 1976, Sottsass married Barbara Radice, an art critic and journalist.

When Roberto Olivetti succeeded as head of the company, he named Sottsass artistic director and offered him a high salary, but Sottsass refused. Instead, he created Studio Olivetti, independent of the company, which became a prominent international centre of design combining research with creation and industrial strategy. His concern that his creativity would be stifled by corporate work is documented in his 1973 essay When I was a Very Small Boy.

In 1968, the Royal College of Art in London granted Sottsass an honorary doctorate.

== Memphis Group ==
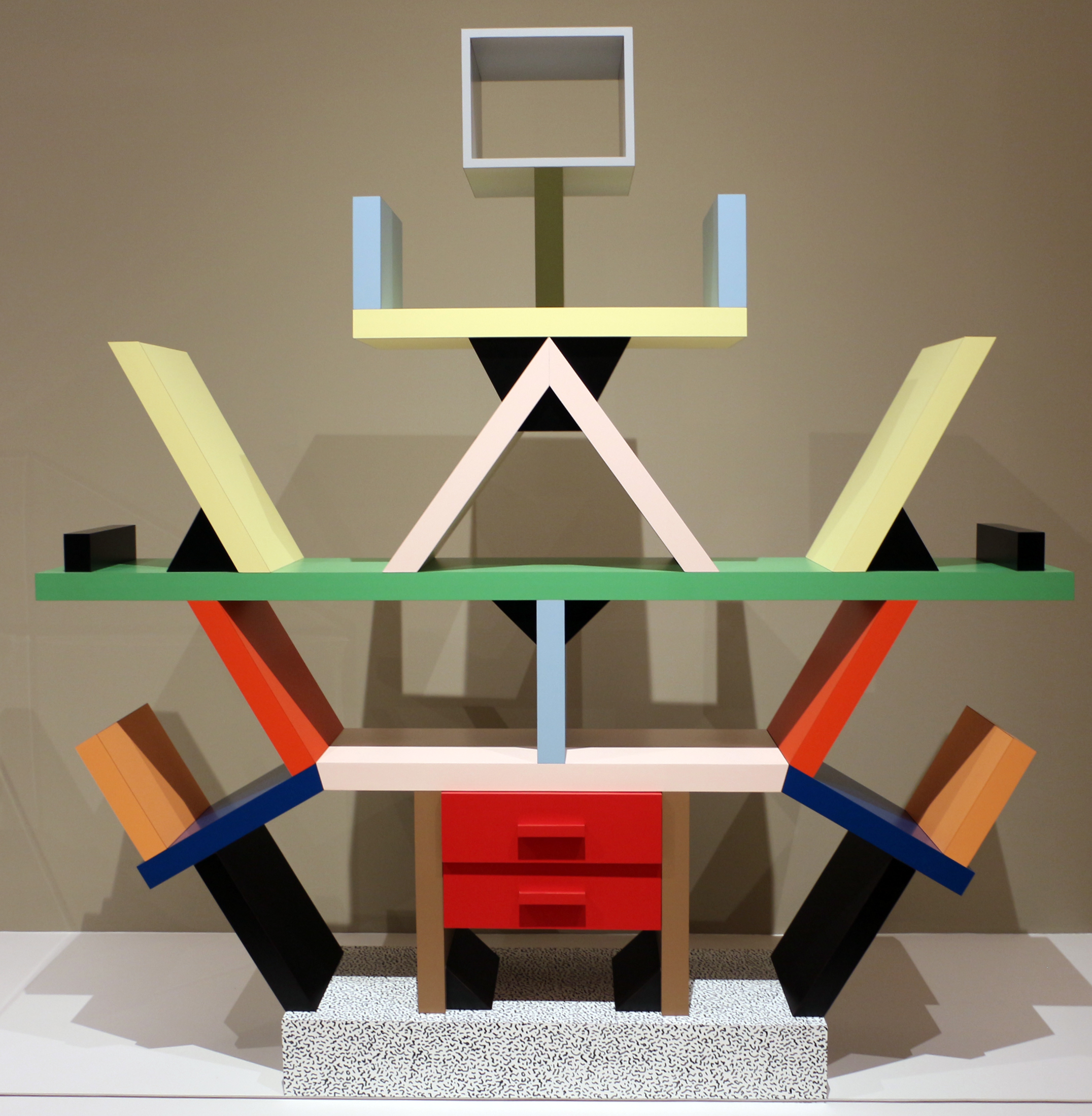
Carlton bookcase (1981)

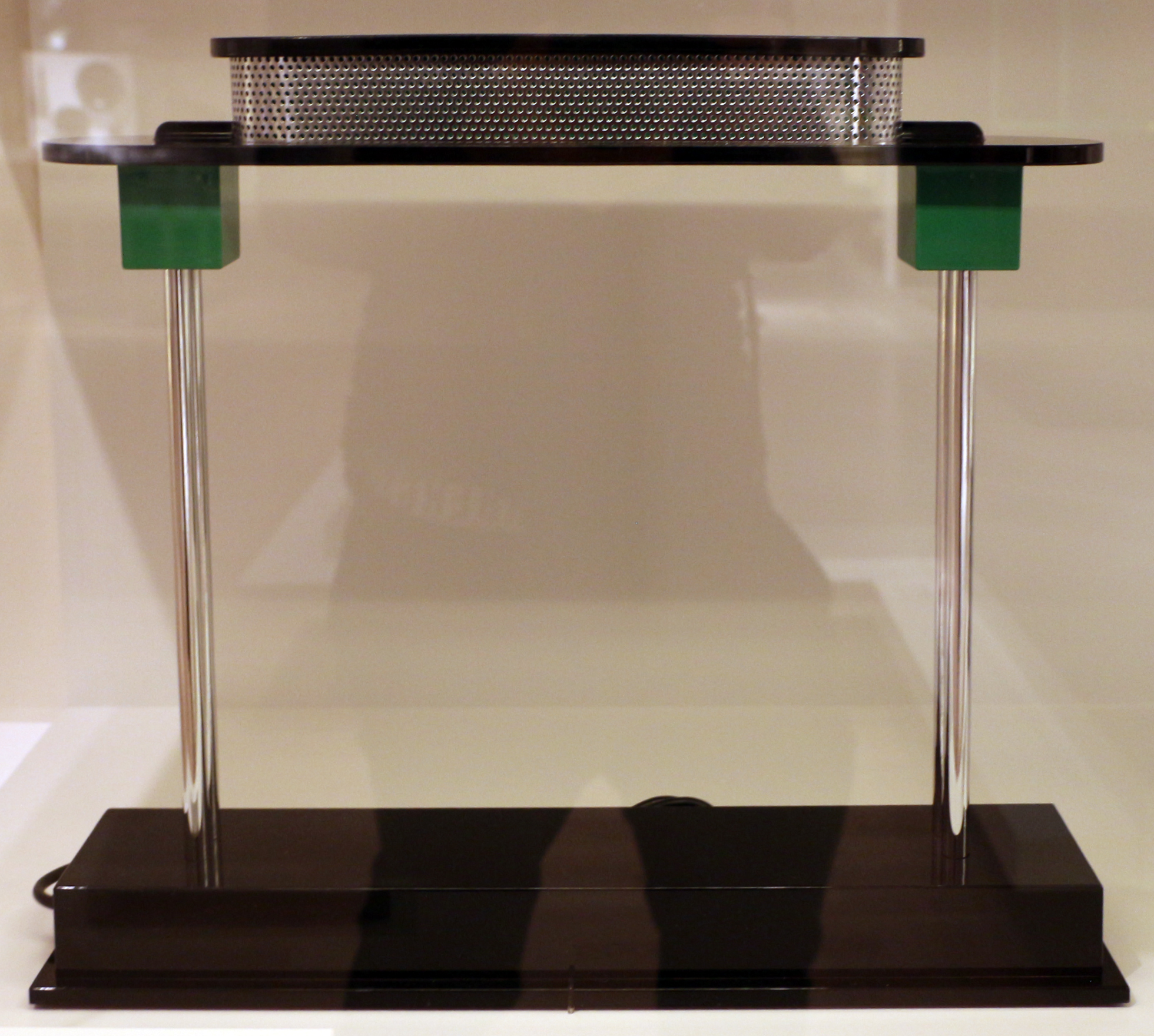
Artemide Pausania table lamp (1983)

With the rise of new groups (Global Tools, Archizoom, Superstudio, UFO, Zzigurat, 9999), the handmade style emerged as a vehicle for experimentation, with many of these groups exploring this approach to renew creation. In October 1980, Sottsass received two proposals: one from Renzo Brugola, a longstanding friend and carpenter, expressing his desire "to make something together like in the good old times"; and the other from Mario and Brunella Godani, owners of the Design Gallery Milano, who asked him to create "new furniture" for their gallery.

Sottsass founded the Memphis Group in Milan on 11 December 1980, after the Bob Dylan song "Stuck Inside of Mobile with the Memphis Blues Again" played during the group's inaugural meeting. The group was active from 1981 to 1988 and was created as a reaction against the design status quo. Sottsass centred the group's thinking around what he described as "radical, funny, and outrageous", disregarding prevailing notions of "good taste". The group drew inspiration from Art Deco, the colour palette of Pop art and kitsch themes of the 1950s. Colourful laminate and terrazzo were commonly used in their work, incorporated into floors, tables and lamps.

Sottsass also designed his own print, a squiggly pattern known as the Bacterio print. He drew inspiration from the surface texture and form of a Buddhist temple in Madurai, India, abstracting this detail into the squiggles he named Bacterio. The pattern was then applied to furniture designs as veneers and textiles.

The Memphis Group was a postmodern, collaborative architecture and design group based in Milan, Italy. The group focused on furniture design with an emphasis on unconventional forms. The designers became known for bright, bold pieces with clashing colours, challenging the prevailing view that furniture should be solely functional. Their highly decorative pieces reinterpreted everyday objects as works of art. Although their unconventional ideas were controversial at the time, the work has become widely recognised and influential. Examples can be found in the Art Institute of Chicago, the Design Museum in London, the Museum of Modern Art in New York and elsewhere.

== Sottsass Associati ==
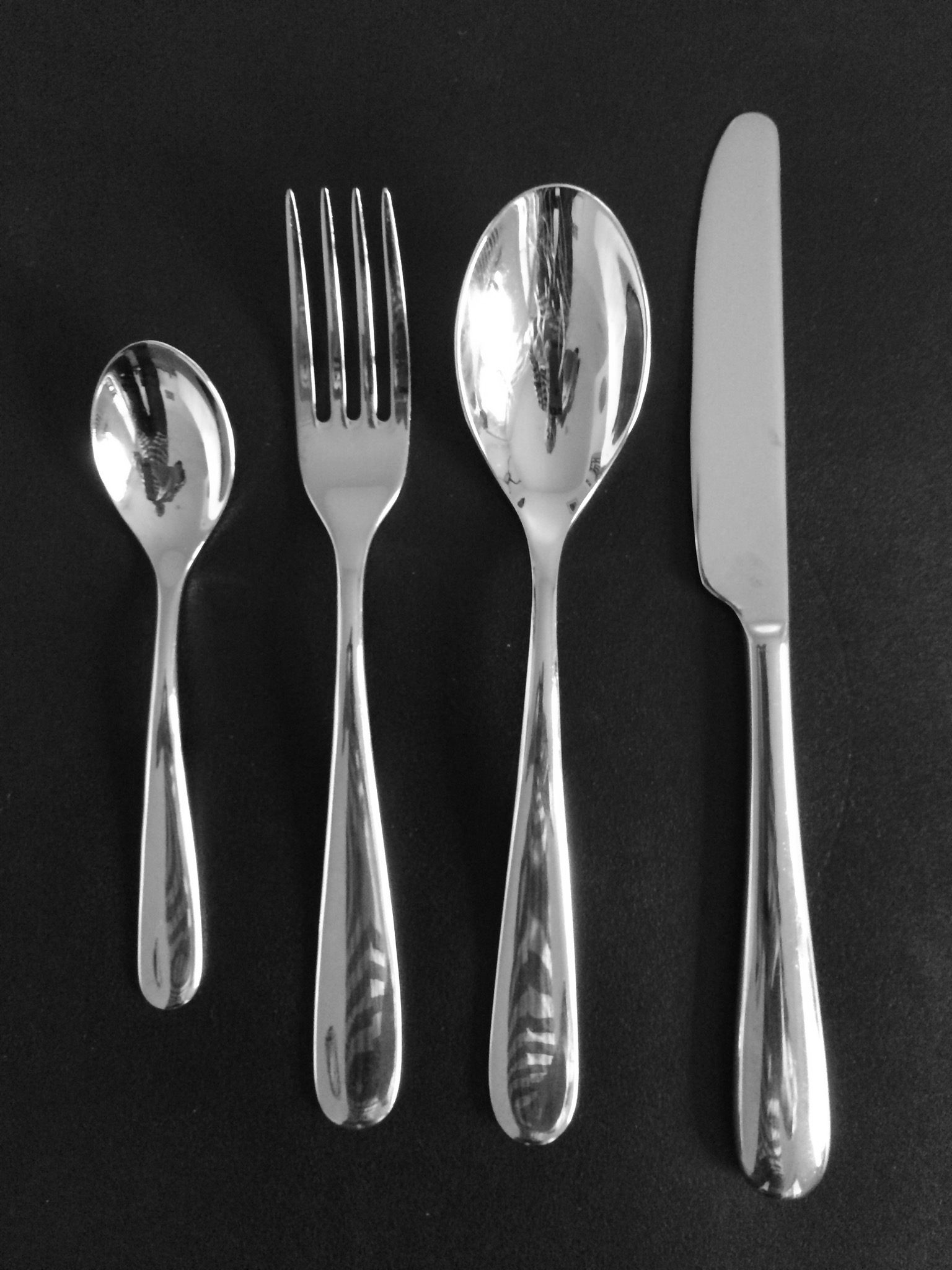
Alessi Nuovo Milano cutlery (1989)

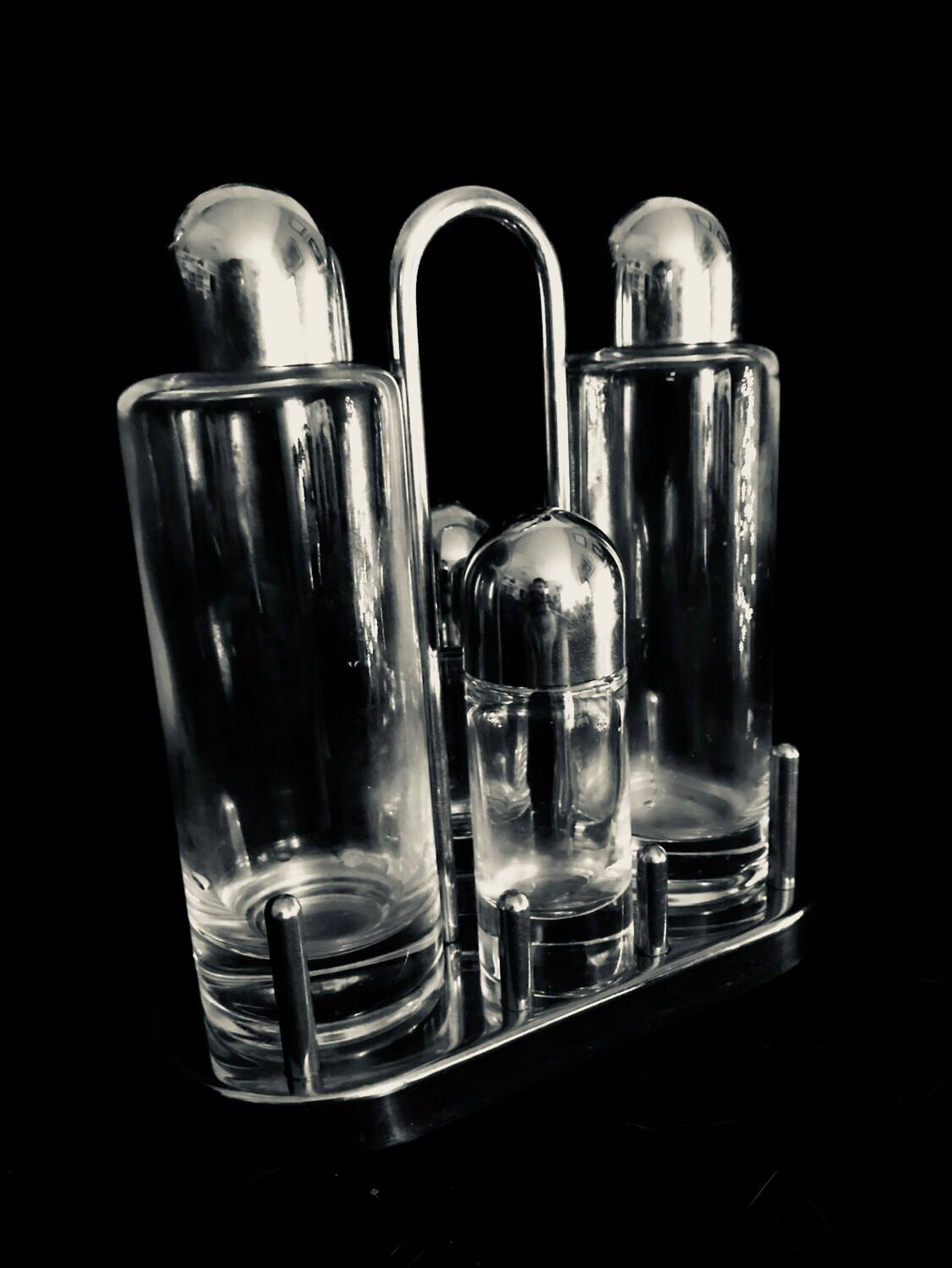
Cruet set 5070 for Alessi

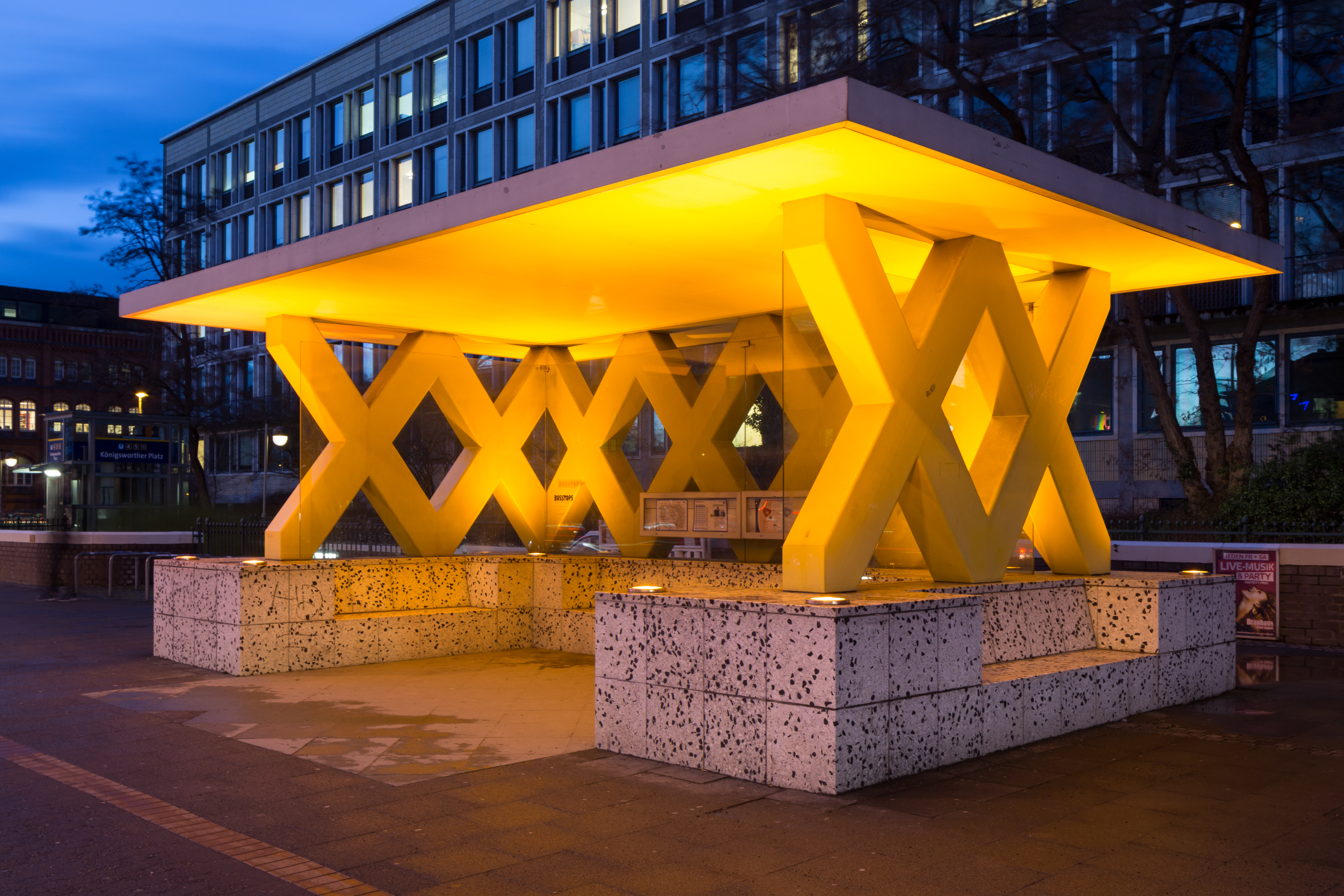
Bus stop in Hanover (2001)

As the Memphis movement attracted worldwide attention in the 1980s for its energy and flamboyance, Sottsass began assembling a major design consultancy, which he named Sottsass Associati. Established in 1980, the firm provided the opportunity to build architecture on a substantial scale and to design for large international industries. Besides Sottsass, the other founding members were Aldo Cibic, Marco Marabelli, Matteo Thun and Marco Zanini. Later, Johanna Grawunder, Marco Susani, James Irvine and Mike Ryan also joined the firm. In 1985, Sottsass left the Memphis Group to focus on the Associati.

Sottsass Associati, primarily an architectural practice, also designed stores and showrooms for Esprit, identities for Alessi, exhibitions, interiors, consumer electronics in Japan and furniture of all kinds. The studio was based on the cultural guidance of Sottsass; its many young associates frequently left to establish their own studios. Sottsass Associati is now based in London and Milan and continues to sustain the work, philosophy and culture of the studio.

The studio works with former members of Memphis as well as with the architect Johanna Grawunder, and counts among its clients Apple, Philips, Siemens, Zanotta, Fiat and Alessi. It also designed the interiors of all the retail shops of Esprit.

== Notable achievements in design ==
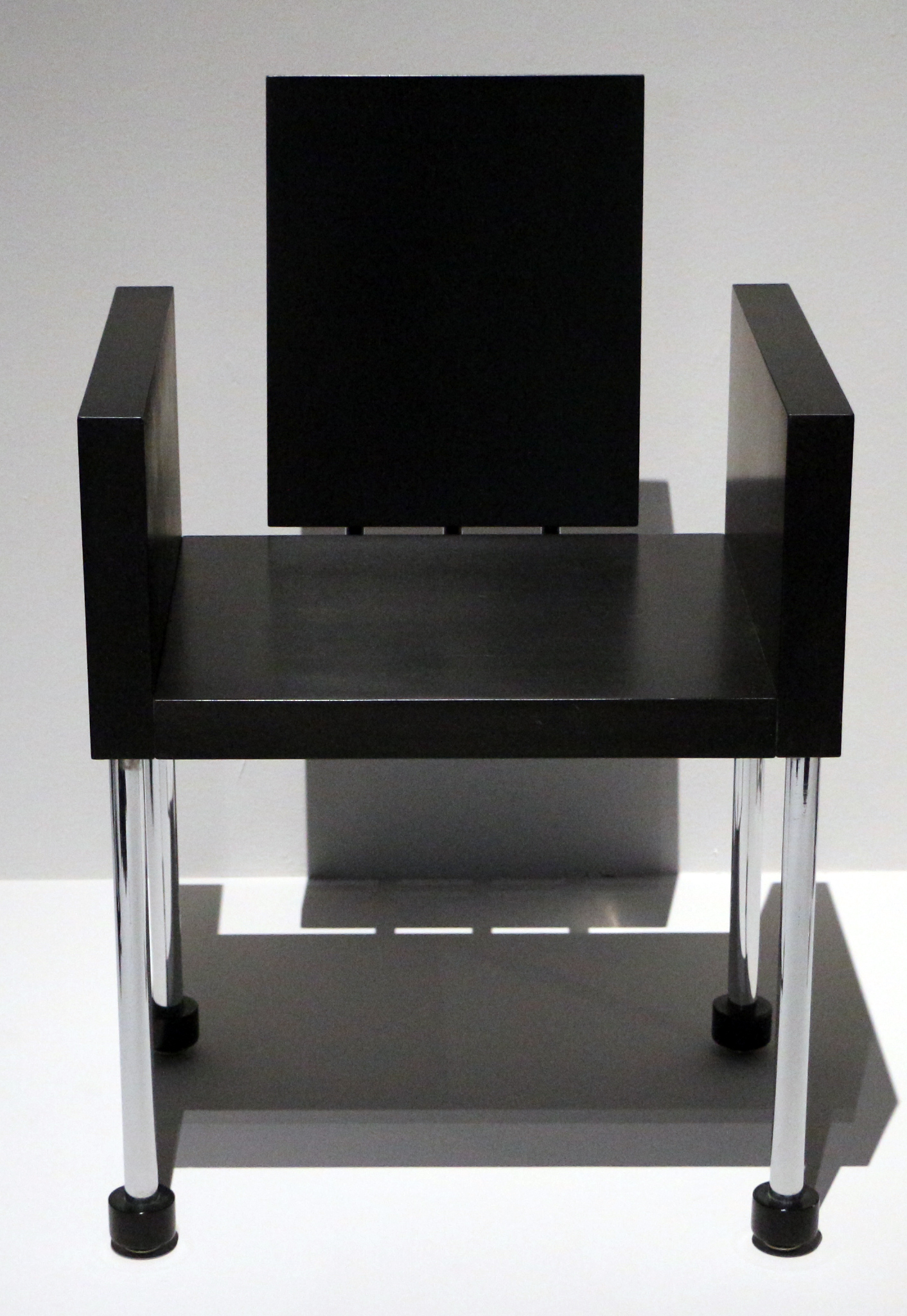
Miss don't you like caviar chair (1987), Musée National d'Art Moderne-Centre Pompidou

- Olivetti ELEA mainframe computer, winner of the Compasso d'Oro in 1959
- Valentine typewriter, Olivetti, 1969
- Superbox cabinet, Poltronova, 1966
- SUMMA 19 electronic calculator, Olivetti, winner of the Compasso d'Oro in 1970
- Ultrafragola mirror, Poltronova, 1970
- Tahiti lamp, Memphis, 1981
- Murmansk fruit bowl, Memphis, 1982
- Carlton bookcase, Memphis, 1981
- Malabar bookcase, Memphis, 1981
- Casablanca cabinet, Memphis, 1981
- Enorme phone, 1986
- Miss don't you like caviar chair, 1987
- Apollodoro Gallery, clock on display, seventh event The Hour of Architects, with Michael Graves, Hans Hollein, Arata Isozaki, Paolo Portoghesi, paintings by Paolo Salvati, Rome, 1987
- Memories of China collection, the Gallery Mourmans, 1996
- Mandarin chair, Knoll, 1986
- Glass works for Venini
- Glass works for the CIRVA
- Nuovo Milano cutlery set, designed with Alberto Gozzi in 1987 for Alessi, winner of the 16th Compasso d'Oro in 1991
- Twergi collection, Alessi, 1989
- Nine-0 chair for Emeco, Sottsass's final chair design, released in 2008 shortly after his death

== Notable achievements in architecture ==
- Fiorucci store, 1980
- Esprit showroom, Düsseldorf, 1985
- Esprit showroom, Zurich, 1985
- Esprit showroom, Hamburg, 1985
- Building, Marina di Massa, 1985
- Alessi showroom, Milan, 1985
- Wolf house, Ridgway, Colorado, 1985, with Johanna Grawunder
- Zibibbo bar, Fukuoka, 1989
- Olabuenaga house, Maui, 1989, with Johanna Grawunder
- Cei house, Empoli, 1989
- Bischofberger house, Zurich, 1989, with Johanna Grawunder
- Museum of Contemporary Art, Ravenna, 1992
- Ghella house, Rome, 1993
- Green house, London, 1993
- Motoryacht Amazon Express, 1994
- Golf and club resort, Zhaoqing, 1994
- Malpensa Airport, Milan, 1994
- Nanon house, Lanaken, 1995
- Van Impe house, Sint-Lievens-Houtem, 1996, with Johanna Grawunder
- Alitalia waiting room, 1997
- Bird House, Lanaken, 1998, with Johanna Grawunder
- Kelley Residence, Woodside, 2000
- Roppongi Island, Tokyo, 2004
- Sport house, Nanjing, 2004
- Entry gates of the W. Keith and Janet Kellogg Gallery, Cal Poly Pomona, 1995

== Other works ==
As an industrial designer, Sottsass's clients included Fiorucci, Esprit, the Italian furniture company Poltronova, Knoll International, Serafino Zani, Alessi, Brondi and Brionvega. As an architect, he designed the Mayer-Schwarz Gallery on Rodeo Drive in Beverly Hills, California, with its dramatic doorway made of irregular folds and jagged angles, and the home of David M. Kelley, designer of Apple's first computer mouse, in Woodside, California. The interiors of Milan–Malpensa Airport were designed by Sottsass in the late 1990s, though he did not design the building itself. In the mid-1990s, he designed the sculpture garden and entry gates of the W. Keith and Janet Kellogg Gallery at Cal Poly Pomona. He collaborated with well-known figures in architecture and design, including Aldo Cibic, James Irvine and Matteo Thun.

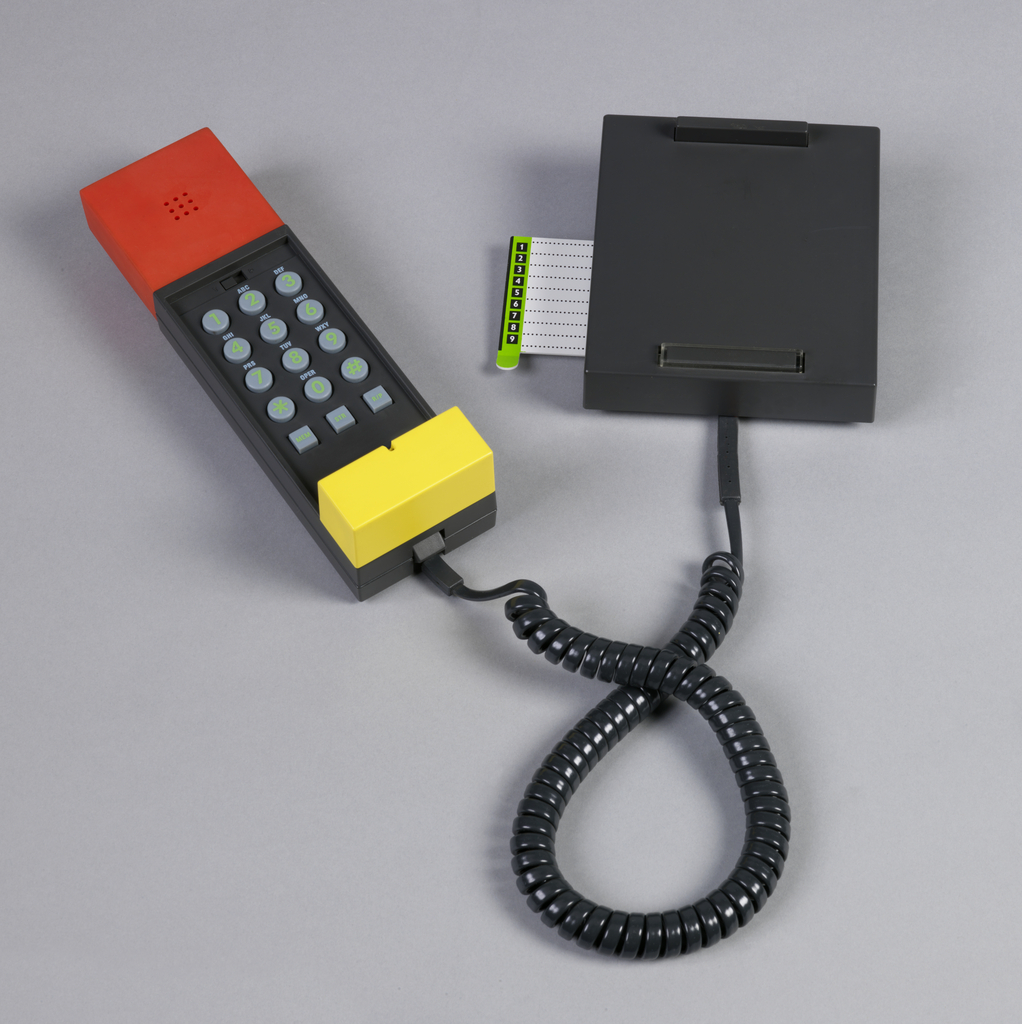
Enorme Telephone

Sottsass created a vast body of work spanning furniture, jewellery, ceramics, glass, silverwork, lighting, office machine design and buildings. In 2006, the Los Angeles County Museum of Art held the first major museum survey exhibition of his work in the United States. A retrospective exhibition, Ettore Sottsass: Work in Progress, was held at the Design Museum in London in 2007. In 2009, the Marres Centre for Contemporary Culture in Maastricht presented a reconstruction of Sottsass's 1969 exhibition Miljö för en ny planet (Landscape for a New Planet), which had taken place in the Nationalmuseum in Stockholm. In 2017, on the occasion of Sottsass's centenary, the Met Breuer museum in New York City presented the retrospective Ettore Sottsass: Design Radical.

One of his works, Telefono Enorme, designed with David M. Kelley for Brondi, is part of the MoMA collection, along with many drawings. Design objects and drawings by Sottsass are also in the permanent collections of the Metropolitan Museum of Art, the Design Museum in London, the Vitra Design Museum, the Brooklyn Museum, the Cooper Hewitt, Smithsonian Design Museum, the Stedelijk Museum, the Los Angeles County Museum of Art, the Musée National d'Art Moderne in Paris, the Philadelphia Museum of Art and the Museum of Fine Arts, Houston.

In 1999, he was awarded the Sir Misha Black Medal and was added to the College of Medallists.

In 2023, his work was included in the exhibition Mirror Mirror: Reflections on Design at Chatsworth at Chatsworth House.

== Popular culture ==
Alex, the lead character in Stanley Kubrick's film A Clockwork Orange, uses an Olivetti Valentine. The design also appeared in the 2007 André Téchiné film The Witnesses. In 2016, David Bowie's Valentine sold at a Sotheby's auction in London for £45,000, against a presale estimate of £300–£500.

== Publications ==
- Guia Sambonet, Ettore Sottsass: Movili e Qualche Arredamento (Furniture and A Few Interiors), Arnoldo Mondadori Editore, 1985
- Hans Höger, Ettore Sottsass Jun.: Designer, Artist, Architect, Wasmuth, Tübingen/Berlin, 1993
- Barbara Radice, Ettore Sottsass: A Critical Biography, Thames & Hudson, 1993
- Francois Barre, Andrea Branzi, etc., Ettore Sottsass, Centre G. Pompidou, Paris, 1994
- Fulvio Ferrari, Ettore Sottsass: tutta la ceramica, Allemandi, Turin, 1996
- Bruno Bischofberger, Ettore Sottsass: Ceramics, Chronicle Books, 1996
- M. Carboni (edited by), Ettore Sottsass e Associati, Rizzoli, Milan, 1999
- M. Carboni (edited by), Ettore Sottsass: Esercizi di Viaggio, Aragno, Turin, 2001
- M. Carboni e B. Radice (edited by), Ettore Sottsass: Scritti, Neri Pozza Editore, Milan, 2002
- M. Carboni e B. Radice (edited by), Metafore, Skirà Editore, Milan, 2002
- M. Carboni (edited by), Sottsass: fotografie, Electa, Naples, 2004
- M. Carboni (edited by), Sottsass 700 disegni, Skirà Editore, Milan, 2005
- M. Carboni (edited by), Sottsass '60/'70, Editions HYX, Orléans, France, 2006
- Ronald T. Labaco and Dennis P. Doordan, Ettore Sottsass: Architect and Designer, Los Angeles County Museum of Art/Merrell, London/New York, 2006
- Sally Schöne, Ettore Sottsass: auch der Turm von Babel war aus gabrannter Erde (and tower of Babel was also made of terracotta), Wienand, 2011
- Philippe Thomé, Ettore Sottsass, Phaidon, New York, 2014 ISBN 978-0-7148-6584-3
- Barbara Radice, Ettore Sottsass: There is a Planet, catalogue for exhibition at Triennale Design Museum, Electa, 2016
- Francesca Zanella, Ettore Sottsass: Catalogo ragionato dell'archivio 1922–1978 CSAC/Università di Parma, Silvana, Milan, 2017
- Fulvio Ferrari, Sottsass: 1000 Ceramics, AdArte s.r.l., 2017
- Luca Massimo Barbero, Pasquale Gagliardi, Marino Barovier, etc., Ettore Sottsass: The Glass, Skira/Rizzoli, Milan, 2017
- Gean Moreno, Ettore Sottsass and the Social Factory, Institute of Contemporary Art, Miami, 2020 ISBN 978-3-7913-5882-6
