= Marco Piva =

Marco Piva, Italian architect, interior designer and product designer, born on February 15, 1952, in Milan.

== Biography ==
He graduated in architecture at Politecnico di Milano and founded STUDIODADA in 1977, that was one of the main design offices of the radical period.

In 1990, he opens his own brand, Studio Marco Piva, with activities ranging from large architectural projects for tourist facilities, to interior design, masterplan, and finally industrial design.

From 1987 to 1990, he was member of the Presidential Board of Associazione per il Disegno Industriale (ADI). In 1987, Marco Piva also founded IDA, International Design Agency, an Italian interface for a World Design Network system.

In 2001, a variety of experiences in strategic consulting in the field of design and hotel hospitality culminated in consulting with the hospitality division of Federlegno. In 2002, “Atelier Design” was established, the Studio's atelier which was created as a centre for industrial design research and development.

Meantime, this remarkable activity has been combined with teaching positions at universities and design institutes both in Italy and abroad, and the organisation of the post-graduate master's degree program at the Politecnico di Milano the Polytechnic School of Design and the Istituto Europeo di Design in Milan.

== Major works ==
- Osaka Gas Corporation Ltd. “Building”– Osaka, interior design, 1992-1994
- Hotel Carrobbio – Milano, Interior Design, 1997-1999
- Eurocongressi Hotel – Cavaion, Verona Interior Design, 1998-2000
- Starhotel Michelangelo – Firenze, Interior Design, 1998-2000
- Hotel dei Cavalieri Milano, (7th floor and meeting rooms interior design, 2000-2002)
- Laguna Palace Hotel – Venezia, Architettura & Interior Design, 2000-2002
- Hotel Mirage – Kazan, Russia Architecture & Interior Design, 2001-2003
- Port Palace Monaco – Principato di Monaco, Interior Design, 2002-2004
- T Hotel Cagliari, 2003-2005
- Club Med – Caprera, Master Plan Concept, 2006
- Porto Dubai – Dubai, Master Plan, 2006
- Tiara Hotel – Dubai, Interior Design, 2006-2010
- Hotel Residence Le Terrazze – Villorba, Architettura, 2006-2011
- Move Hotel – Mogliano Veneto Architettura, Interior & Light Design, 2009-2011
- Complessi residenziali a Milano progettati con Zaha Hadid e Daniel Libeskind, 2010-2013
- Beijing Feng-Tai Financial District – Concept design, Master Plan, 2011
- Rawdhat Residential Buildings – Abu Dhabi, 2012
- Hotel Excelsior Gallia – Milan, Architecture, Landscape, Lighting, Interior Design, 2010-2015
- Casa Alitalia lounges – Milan Malpensa - Fiumicino Airport, 2016
- Pantheon Iconic Hotel – Rome, Interior Design, 2018
- La Suite Hotel – Matera, Interior Design, 2019
- Palazzo del Touring Club Italiano, Milano, 2021
- Palazzo Nani, Venezia, 2021
- Tonino Lamborghini Towers – Chengdu, China Interior Design - ongoing
- Princype Residential Complex – Milan, Italy Architecture & Interior Fit out - ongoing

== Awards and acknowledgement ==
- Triennale – Milan
- Landesgewerbemt Museum – Stuttgart
- Design Center – Cologne
- Kortrijk Design Biennale Interieur – Kortrijk
- European Community Design Prize – Seville
- Una Camera per l’Europa – Genoa
- Contract World Award – Hannover
- The European Hotel Design Awards - London
- Hospitality Award 2009 – Innovation
- Best Communicator Award, Marmomacc 2010, Verona
- ADI Design Index 2011 for the design of MGM Furnari
- World Travel Awards for the Excelsior Hotel Gallia, 2015-2016-2017-2018-2019-2020
- Good Design Award, 2017, ZEIT handle for Mandelli1953
- ADI Index, 2017, Category “Exhibition”, Designing the Complexity
- IF Design Award, 2018, Book radiator design Marco Piva for Caleido
- China Awards 2018, Capital Elite award for the urban development in China
- Wallpaper (magazine) Design Awards, 2019, Dream Factory category, Marty, Visionnaire
- Luxury Lifestyle Awards, 2020, category “Best Luxury Architect and Interior Design Studios in Milan, Italy”

== Main exhibitions ==
- Light Hours - Salon du Meuble, Paris
- Marco Piva Designs for Tomorrow – Host, Milan
- Design Bar, Il Caos Felice – Sia Guest, Rimini
- Sicis Teatro, L’arte dell’abitare tra materia e luce – CRT Teatro dell’Arte, Milan, 2006
- Marco Piva Notebook Design Party – Teatro dell’Arte, I Saloni 2008, Milano
- Interni Design Energies – Limitless Color Tower – "University of Milan"
- Beauty Cave – Interni Think Tank – Università degli Studi di Milano
- La mano del Designer – disegni di Marco Piva – Villa Necchi Campiglio – Triennale Bovisa, Milano
- Marmomacc Meets Design “Irregolare Eccezionale” – Marmomacc 2010, Verona Fiere
- Tron Designs Corian – Milan Furniture Fair 2011

== Product design ==
- A Project
- Altreforme
- Arflex
- Arpa
- Bross Italia
- Corinto
- Deko Collezioni
- Ege
- Iradium
- Jacuzzi
- La Murrina
- Leucos
- Meritalia
- Moroso
- Novello
- Pedrali
- Potacco
- Rapsel
- Reflex
- Rubinetterie Stella
- Uno Più
- Vda
- Valpra
- Zonca
