= Tomoiku Ara =

Japanese architect

Tomoiku Ara (荒 知幾; born 1950 in Tokyo) is a Japanese architect and interior designer. He graduated from the Nihon University Department of Fine Arts.

== Chronology ==
- 1950 – Born in Tokyo
- 1973 – Graduated from Nihon University
- 1976 – Moved to Italy. Pietro Frenguelli Architects Office.
- 1979 – Joined the Superstudio in Florence, studied under Cristiano Toraldo Di Francia
- 1981 – Prized at the 16th Triennale di Milano
- 1982 – Established Studio Tomo Ara
- 1988–1993 – College of Industrial Technology, Nihon University Lecturer in Architectural Engineering
- 2002–2007 – Nihon University College of Art Lecturer in Architectural Design Instructor

== Representative works ==
In 1986, the reconstruction of the Hotel New Hakodate was published in the Italian magazine Ottagono. The project received international recognition.

In 1988, Ara designed the interior of a residential building, Villa In A Small Mountain, and in 1992, the interior of a restaurant, CAPRICCIO.

In 2008, Ara completed a large-scale apartment building in Chitose Karasuyama, which he designed in collaboration with architects Cristiano Traldo di Francia and Hiroshi Soeda, under the theme of "Nature in the City".

As a contributor, Ara has successfully organized international events such as TEATRO SUPERSTUDIO (2008) and X-SCAPES Design Exhibition (2009).

As of 2020, architecture and design projects are underway, focusing on regenerative architecture and other forms of "Community Design".

== Literature ==
- "DESIGN PER LA TERRA – STUDIO TOMO ARA ASSOCIATI" 1992
- STUDIO TOMO ARA – Official Website, browsed 27 December 2020
