= Brondi (company) =

Brondi S.p.A.
- Type: Private
- Industry: Electronics; Mobile phone
- Founded: 1935; 91 years ago
- Founder: Lorenzo Brondi
- Headquarters: Moncalieri, Italy
- Area served: Italy
- Products: Mobile phones; Landline phones; Transceivers; Answering machines; Walkie-talkies
- Website: www.brondi.it

Brondi S.p.A. is an Italian telecommunications company established by Lorenzo Brondi in 1935 to produce telephones in the post-war years.

The company is specialized in Dual SIM mobile phones, smartphones, landline phones and transceivers.

== History ==
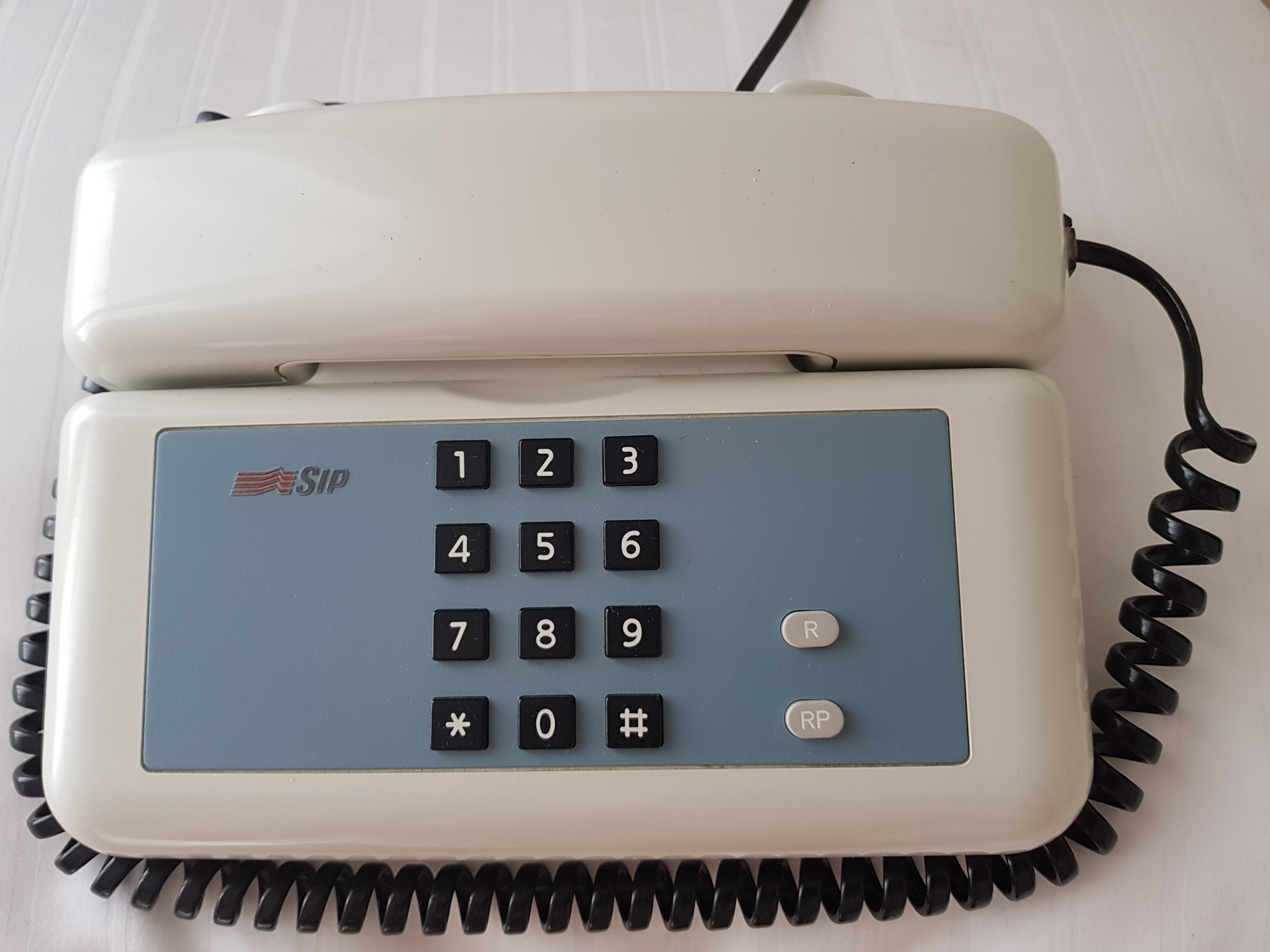
Sirio

In the beginning Brondi was specialized in landline telephones, it produced the first certified cordless telephone for the Italian market (in 1987 with Bronditel) and was the first company to invest in mobile telephones in Italy in the 1990s.

It became one of the main suppliers of the state Italian telephonic company SIP, producing a famous Italian landline telephone, Sirio.

== Recognition ==
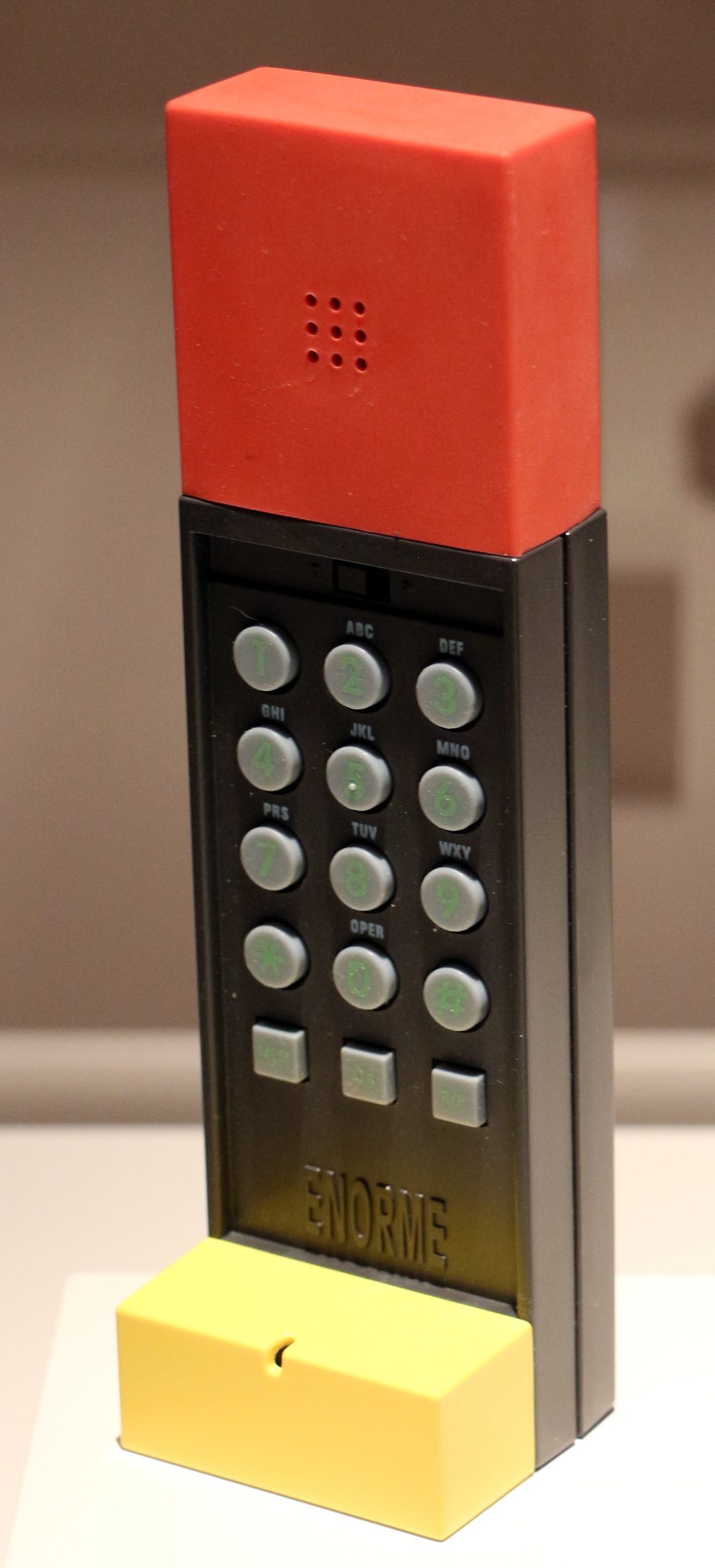
Telefono Enorme

The Enorme Telephone, designed by Ettore Sottsass for Brondi (1986) is part of the MoMA collection in New York and the designer 'choice USA. It was manufactured by Brondi between 1986 and 1994.

== See also ==
- List of Italian companies
