= Aldo Cibic =

Italian designer

Aldo Cibic (born 1955 in Schio, Vicenza, Italy) is an Italian designer.

== Career ==
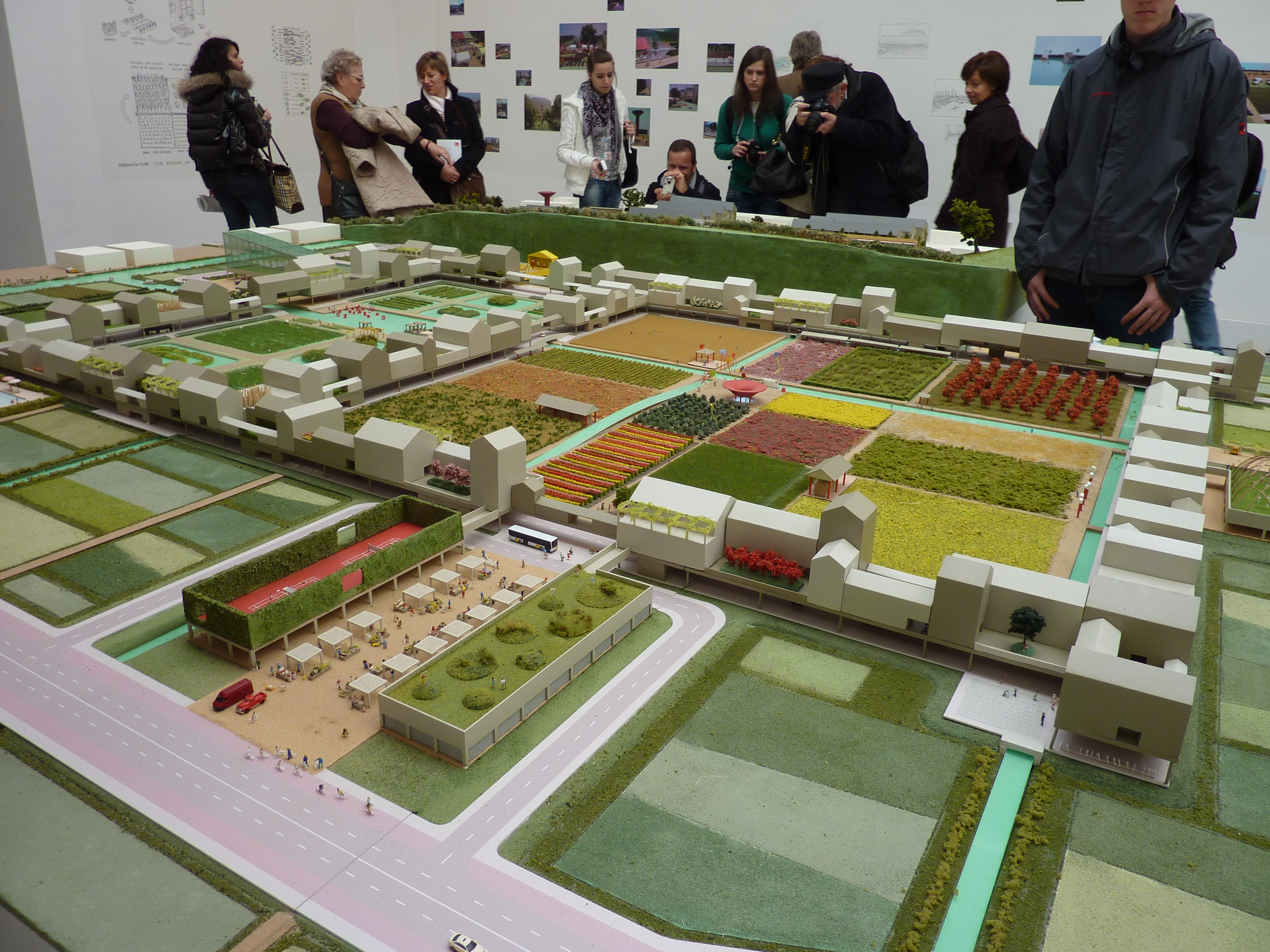
Rethinking Happiness during the Venice Biennale in 2010

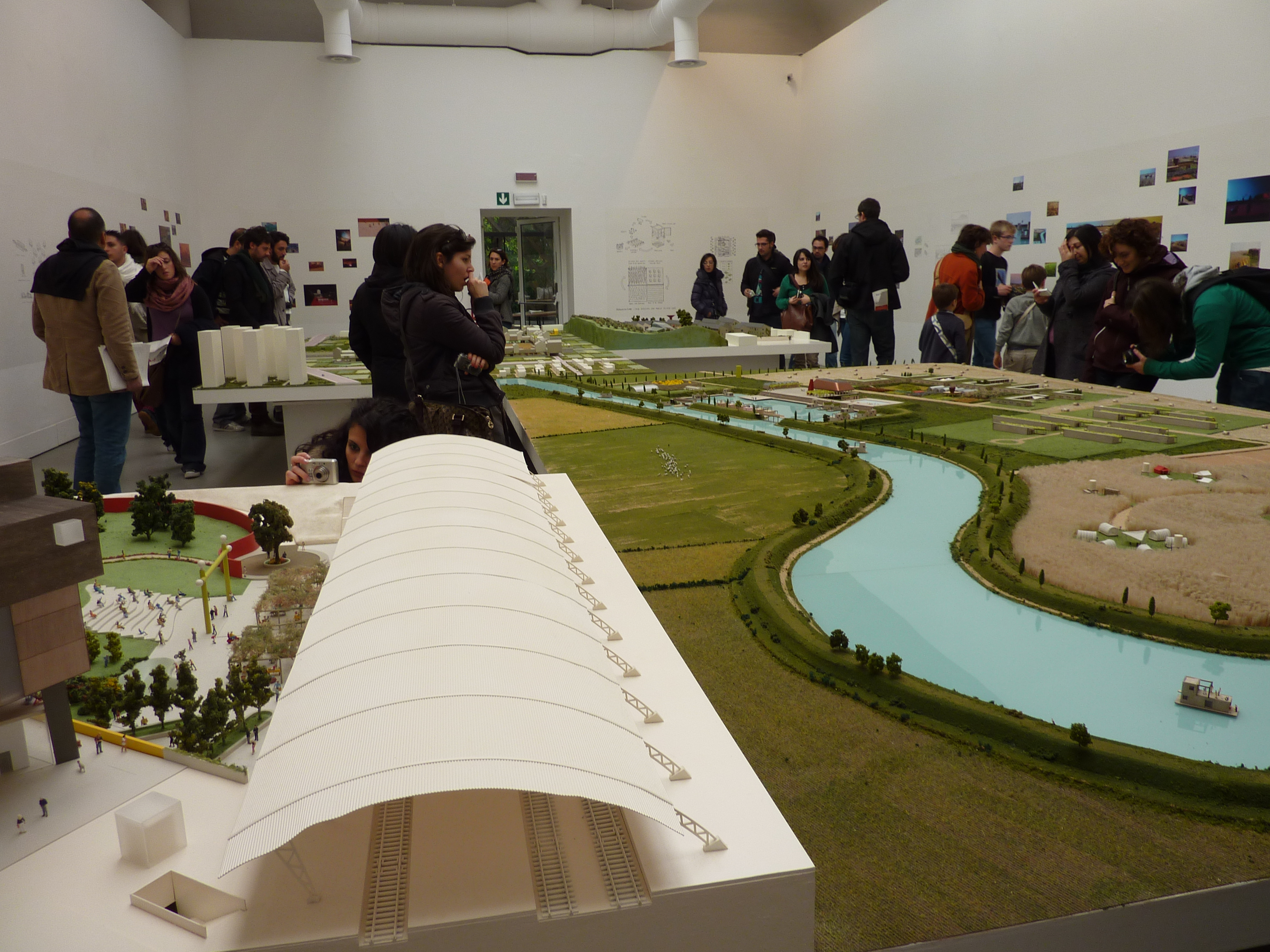
Rethinking Happiness during the Venice Biennale in 2010

By the age of 22, Aldo was working at the studio of Ettore Sottsass. In 1980, he became a founding partner of the studio Sottsass & Associati. That same year, in collaboration with Sottsass, Cibic became a founding member of Memphis Group – a collective association dedicated to design and architecture. The Memphis group would remain active until 1987. The Memphis experience led Cibic to assume an experimental approach as his norm.

Decisive the relationship with Ettore Sottsass, who chose him as a partner when Aldo was in his twenties, and in his last interview declares: “I do not think I have left any traces of my work, maybe something in Aldo Cibic” .

Towards the end of the 1980s, Aldo began to reflect on a more personal concept of creativity, which inspired the launch of his first independent project. In line with his idea of a more human, less heroic form of design, he choose not only to design objects for the home, but also to sell them, He presented his first self-produced collection, entitled “Standard”, to the public from his loft home in Milan, inaugurating a tradition of impromptu exhibitions, which have since become a means of testing his design projects and continue to guide his research.

His research activity in the field of "social innovation design" has developed through teaching in various schools of Design and Architecture (Domus Academy Milan, Politecnico Milan, IUAV Venice, Tongji University Shanghai). Starting with Family Business, in "The Solid Side" initiative, launched in collaboration with Philips Corporate Design at the Domus Academy in the early 1990s, has produced pioneering projects, such as New Stories New Design (2002), and CitizenCity (2003). These research projects fostered a dynamic relationship between people and space and offered a new mode of designing places based on social interactions, revolving around a central theme: the interpretation of sustainability. An experience culminating with the "Microrealities" project presented at the Biennale di Architettura di Venezia in 2004.

For the 12th edition of Biennale di Architettura di Venezia in 2010, 43 artists were invited by Kazuyo Sejima, including Aldo Cibic to propose a project called "Rethinking happiness" aimed at creating and enhancing happiness in new communities through 4 unique projects. Aldo Cibic invited architects, agronomists, designers, sociologists and energy consultants for the projects.

In 2015, he curated the Venice Pavilion at the 56th International Art Exhibition Biennale of Venice, exploring the declinations of the creative process between globalization and territorial roots.

At the 19th edition of Biennale di Architettura di Venezia in 2025, Aldo Cibic presents the project “Venice Forever – from Reality to Imagination”. Created by Cibicworkshop (Aldo Cibic, Chuck Felton and Jo Dejardin) and Andrea Rinaldo (Stockholm Water Prize 2023), “Venice Forever” presents itself as a series of fragments of visions and questions in which the actors of the invention of the future of Venice are young researchers, who are given the opportunity to settle in Venice to work on the invention of its future.

In 2019 Aldo Cibic has been selected as High-End Foreign Expert by the State Administration of Foreign Experts Affairs of People's Republic of China.

Aldo Cibic is Honorary Professor at the Tongji University, Shanghai.

In 2021 he has been appointed Honorary Professor of Urban Studies at the Shanghai Academy of Social Sciences.

His design pieces and drawings are exhibited in the permanent collections of the Stedelijk Museum in Amsterdam, the Groninger Museum, the CCA (Canadian Center for Architecture) in Montreal, the Victoria and Albert Museum in London, the Triennale Museum of Italian Design in Milan and the Centre Pompidou in Paris.

Aldo Cibic has been included by the architecture magazine Domus in the guide to the world's best architects “100+ best architecture firms 2019”. Inter alia, Domus editors Alessandro Mendini and Joseph Grima put forward a selection in favour of giving a voice to practices that show how “it may be possible for social architecture to really bloom in the future”.

== Cibic Workshop ==
Using investigative research into design, Cibic Workshop observes the built environment from a different perspective and on a different scale. The individual becomes the central focus, along with his/her complex system of relationships, his/her ability to imagine and invent, to discover new opportunities and to take advantage of change.

Cibic Workshop focuses on alternative sustainable project types aimed at enhancing whole local areas and defining new cultural, emotional and environmental awareness of public space.

In 2020 Cibic Workshop opened a new office in Shanghai, with a focus on creating meaningful and culturally relevant objects, spaces and communities, both public and private, through addressing the issues we see as most important to society today.

Key Areas of work:

- Accessible beauty for domestic spaces
- Communal Landscapes creating a sense of community and responsibility for shared spaces and environments
- The New Old, new design from old materials

=== Selected Design Research projects ===
- Venice Forever – from Reality to Imagination, 19th Biennale di Architettura, Venice 2025
- NICE 2035 Urban Renovation Project Art Direction, Shanghai, 2018
- Looking ahead. The evolution of the art of making. 9 stories from Veneto: digital – not only digital, Venice Pavilion, 56th Biennale Venezia, 2015
- Freedom Room: Triennale di Milano, Milan 2013
- Toward Expo Milano 2015, Milan, 2011
- Rethinking Happiness: Biennale di Venezia, Venice, 2010
- Perché Design?: CibicWorkshop Project 2006
- 10th Biennale of Architecture: Art Direction, Exhibition Design, Venice 2006
- A Perfect Weekend: Design Research and Exhibition, Cibic & Partners Studio, Milan 2005
- Microrealities: Biennale di Architettura, Venice 2004
- New Stories New Design: Biennale di Architettura, Venice 2004
- Citizen_city: Design Research, Milan 2003
- Smart Home Fitness: Design Research, Milan 1998
- Family Business: The Solid Side, Domus Academy, Milan 1984

=== Publications ===
- Aldo Cibic, "The Role of Design in the Relationship between China and te Word", in David Gosset (editor ), China and the World - Volume 3, Il Mulino, Bologna, 2022 ISBN 978-88-15-38252-8
- Aldo Cibic (editor), Looking ahead. The evolution of the art of making. 9 stories from Veneto: digital – not only digital, Marsilio, Venezia, 2015 ISBN 978-88-317-2250-6
- Cibicworkshop, COMODO, Freedom Room, Vicenza, 2013
- AAVV, Verso Expo Milano 2015, Electa, Milano, 2011, ISBN 9788837085483
- Cristina Morozzi, Progetti di riconciliazione, in Interni, Marzo 2011
- Aldo Cibic, Rethinking Happiness -Do unto others as you would have them do unto you. New realities for changing lifestyles, Corraini Edizioni, Mantova, 2010, ISBN 9788875702656
- Chen Yong Qun Deng Aldo Cibic Italian designer, Tongji University Press, 2009
- AAVV, Progetti & Paesaggi, Mondadori, Milano, 2008
- Aldo Cibic e Cibic&Partners, Microrealities A project about places and people, Skira, Milano, 2006 ISBN 8876248617
- Burigana, M. Ciampi, Italian Designers at Home, Verbavolant, Londra, 2006, ISBN 1-905216-05-X
- Andrea Branzi, Un riformismo colorato, in Interni, Dicembre 2005
- Frida Doveil, Aldo Cibic, Abitare Segesta, Milano, 2005 ISBN 88-86116-66-7
- Cibic & Partners, Aldo Cibic e Erin Sharp, Citizen City, Milano 2003
- AAVV, Aldo Cibic Designer, Skira, Milano, 1999, ISBN 8881185830
- Aldo Cibic e Xavier Moulin, Smart Home Fitness, I.D.S. Editions, Milano, 1998, ISBN 2-9512509-0-8
- Aldo Cibic e Erin Sharp, Family Business, in Ezio Manzini e Marco Susani (a cura di), The Solid Side, V+K Publishing, Naarden, Olanda, 1995
- AAVV, Sottsass Associati, Rizzoli International Publications, Inc. New York 1988 (ed. It. L’Archivolto, Milano, 1989)
- Barbara Radice, Memphis. Ricerche, esperienze, risultati, fallimenti e successi del Nuovo Design, Electa, Milano 1984
- Barbara Radice(editor), Memphis. The new international style, Electa, Milano 1981

== Honors ==
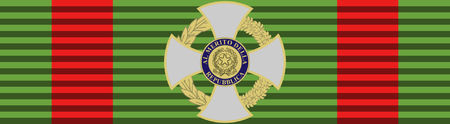

2023 - Knight of the Order of Merit of the Italian Republic.

2023 - Magnolia Silver award - from the Municipality of Shanghai, in recognition of the contributions to the city's development and international exchanges.
