= Johanna Grawunder =

American architect and designer

Johanna Grawunder (born 1961 in San Diego, California) is an American architect, artist, and designer known for her work in lighting.

Her work spans a broad range of projects and scales, from large-scale public installations, architecture and interiors, to limited edition furniture and lights and custom commissions. She also designs products for select companies including Flos, Boffi, and Glas Italia among others.

Notable designs include Robert, the restaurant atop New York City's Museum of Arts and Design, and a lighting installation for the Luxembourg Freeport.

== Career ==
Grawunder attended California Polytechnic State University in San Luis Obispo, graduating with a degree in architecture in 1984. Soon after, she moved to Italy to study, and began working for Sottsass Associati from 1985 to 2001. She became a partner in 1989. At the Sottsass Studio she was involved primarily with architecture and interiors, co-designing many of the firm's most prestigious projects with Ettore Sottsass. In 2001 she left to found a studio, where she has produced lighting object collections for different lighting companies and designed several private residences worldwide.

Grawunder's lighting work often consists of obscured sources in vibrant colors, which lead to unique and interesting glows.

Grawunder's architectural work and design art objects have been reviewed repeatedly by the New York Times and architectural publications like Dwell and Wallpaper.

== Works ==
=== Architecture ===
With Ettore Sottsass :

- Casa Wolf, Ridgway, Colorado, United-States – 1987–1989
- Esprit House, Wels, Austria – 1987–1988 with Marco Zanini
- Mayer Schwartz Gallery, Beverly-Hills, Los Angeles, United-States – 1988–1989
- Casa Olabuenaga, Maui, Hawaï, United-States – 1989
- Gallery for the Museum of Contemporary Furniture, Ravenna, Italy – 1992 with Federica Barbiero
- Bruno Bischofberger House, Zurich, Switzerland – 1991–1996
- Casa Yuko, Tokyo, Japan – 1992
- Zhaoqing Golf Club and Resort, Zhaoqing, China – 1994–1996 with Federica Barbiero
- Mourmans House, Lanaken, Belgium – 1995–2002
- Nanon House, Lanaken, Belgium – 1995–1998
- Van Impe House, St Lievens Houtem, Belgium – 1996–1998 with Gianluigi Mutti
- Jasmin Hill, Singapore 1996 – 2000 with Federica Barbiero and Marco Pollini

=== Interiors ===
- BRW & Partners – 1999–2000
- GIPI, Panepinto Showroom, Milan, Italy – 2002
- Beach House, Milan, Italy – 2003–2004
- Casa Enzo Cucchi, Siracusa, Italy – 2006–2007
- HK House, Hong-Kong – 2006–2009
- Casa Rossella, Rome, Italy – 2012–2013
- Casa Côte d’Azur, Monte-Carlo, Monaco – 2015

=== Industrial Design ===
- Crack, Glasitalia – 2014
- Boxy, Glasitalia – 2011
- Colour on colour – 2010
- XXX, Glasitalia – 2009
- WAN, Flos – 2005
- Wedge, Boffi –
- Sunset & Swimming Pool, B&B –
- Jazz Collection, tableware, Mikasa – 2000–2003

=== Installations and Commissions ===
- Daring the Gap, with Konstantin Grcic and Timo Salli, Cologne, Germany – 2001
- Motocross, Roppongi-Hills streetscape, Tokyo, Japan – 2006–2007
- Percorso Illuminato, Paris, France – 2006, Galerie Italienne, Paris
- Robert Restaurant, Museum of Art&Design, New-York, NY – 2010
- The Singapore Freeport, Singapore – 2010, Galerie Italienne, Paris
- Fendi « Un Art Autre », Tokyo & Beijing – 2013
- 5 W's, San Francisco, USA – 2013
- Freeport Luxembourg, Luxembourg – 2014, Ivan Mietton/ IMDA
- Fendi Miami, USA – 2015, Galleria O, Roma
- Lucepiatti, Geneva, Switzerland – 2015

=== Limited Editions ===
- Many Small Works, The Gallery Mourmans – 1995
- Superluminal, Design Gallery Milano and The Gallery Mourmans
- Air Conditioning, Design Gallery Milano – 1995
- Abyss, Salviati – 2003
- Mémoires de Chine, Mourmans Gallery – 1996
- Lighting Management, Post Design Gallery, Milan – 1997
- Fractals, Post Design Gallery, Milan – 1999
- Lowrider, Post Design Gallery, Milan – 2001
- Masks, Gallery Roberto Giustini – 2002
- In The Desert, Design Gallery Milano – 2003
- Arielle, Galerie Italienne, Paris – 2004
- Street Glow, Galerie Italienne, Paris – 2005
- New Positions, Gallery Roberto Giustini – 2006
- Sakura, Roberto Giustini&Partners, Rome – 2007
- I'm Bringing Sexy Back, Designer's Gallery, Köln, Germany – 2008
- Cylinders, Friedman Benda / Afsoun, New-York – 2010
- Giolight, Roberto Giustini&Partners, Rome – 2008
- Davos Dilemma, Roberto Giustini&Partners, Rome – 2008
- Primum Non Nocere, Galleria Antonella Villanova, Firenze – 2011
- Corbubaby, Ivan Mietton/ IMDA, Paris – 2011
- Big Sky, Carpenters Workshop Gallery, Paris London – 2012
- Noguchigogo, Ivan Mietton/ IMDA, Paris – 2013
- DirtyToys, The Workshop Residence, Los Angeles – 2013
- No Whining on the Yacht, Carpenters Workshop Gallery, Paris London – 2013

=== Unique Pieces ===
- Praga, Prague – 2005, Galerie Italienne, Paris
- Sacem, Paris – 2007, Galerie Italienne, Paris
- AA Furniture, Geneva, Switzerland – 2009, Ivan Mietton/ IMDA
- Tempest WS, Private Yacht – 2009–2010, Ivan Mietton/ IMDA
- MLJ Furniture, Paris, France – 2009, Ivan Mietton/ IMDA
- LB Ceiling Lights, Paris, France – 2010, Ivan Mietton/ IMDA
- Wind Ceiling Light, Saint Martin de Belleville, France – 2010, Ivan Mietton/ IMDA
- Giant Circle Game and Crystal Lights, London, UK – 2010, Ivan Mietton/ IMDA
- Joos Light, Saint-Moritz, Switzerland – 2011
- Park Avenue Lighting Furniture, NYC – 2012, Ivan Mietton/ IMDA
- New-York Flat Screens, NYC – 2013
- Kalligraphy Light, Paris, France – 2013, Ivan Mietton/ IMDA
- Chopi Chopi, Private Yacht – 2013, Ivan Mietton/ IMDA
- Giant Circle Game Light, Beyrouth, Lebanon – 2014, Ivan Mietton/ IMDA
- The Jay Z Light, Paris, France – 2014, Ivan Mietton/ IMDA
- Madame Kate, Private Yacht – 2014, Ivan Mietton/ IMDA
- Magic Cloud – 2015
- Chanel Gold Bar, Madrid, Spain – 2015, Carpenters Workshop Gallery
- Slab Table, London, UK – 2016, Ivan Mietton/ IMDA

== Publications ==
- Foreign Policy, Recent International Light and Design Projects, Marie-Laure Jousset, Galerie Italienne Edition 2007
- Ettore Sottsass Big and Small Works, Johanna Grawunder Many Small Works, Gallery Mourmans Edition, 1995

== Museums and awards ==
Her work has been shown and is included in many Museum permanent collections, including

- LACMA, Los Angeles
- Musée des Arts Décoratifs, Paris
- FNAC, Paris
- San Francisco MOMA
- Art Institute of Chicago
- Museum of Fine Arts, Houston
- High Museum of Atlanta

In 2012, she won the WALLPAPER* Design Award " best use of colour " for the Boxy table made by Glasitalia and in 2010 " best lit lunch " for the lighting installation at Robert, Museum of Art and Design, New-York.
