= Radical period =

Italian architecture and design movement

In Italian design, the Radical period took place in the late 1960s, with a shift in style among the avant-garde. Probably the most notable result of this avant-garde period is the installation called "Superarchitettura", made in Pistoia in 1966. Another important exhibition dedicated to radical design in Italy was held at MoMA in 1972 ("Italy: The New Domestic Landscape").

The radical design movement included many artists, designers and architects from Florence, Turin, Naples, Milan, etc:

- Archizoom, Superstudio, UFO, 9999, Zziggurat (Florence)
- LIBIDARCH, Studio 65, Ceretti-Derossi-Rosso, Piero Gatti, Cesare Paolini, Franco Teodoro, Piero Gilardi, Guido Drocco, and Franco Mello (Turin)
- Riccardo Dalisi (Naples)
- Gruppo Cavart: Piero Brombin and Michele De Lucchi (Padua)
- Gaetano Pesce
- Ugo La Pietra (Milan)

STUDIODADA was another important studio located in Milan. Members of STUDIODADA included: Ada Alberti, Dario Ferrari, Maurizio Maggi, Patrizio Corno, Marco Piva and Paolo Francesco Piva. Other professionals of that period included David Palterer, Tomo Ara, Battista Luraschi, Bepi Maggiori, Alberto Benelli, and Pino Calzana.

Radical Design influenced Studio Alchimia and the Memphis group.

== Postmodernism ==
A movement called Postmodernism or Neomodernism was led by Alessandro Mendini, director of reviews like "Casabella", "Modo" and "Domus" from 1980 to 1985. Mendini's postmodernism inspired exhibitions like "L'interno oltre la forma dell'utile" (Interior space beyond the form of usefulness) held at the Triennale di Milano in 1980.

== See also ==
- Pop art – Art movement emerging in the mid-1950s
