= STUDIODADA =

Italian architecture and design firm

STUDIODADA (founding members)
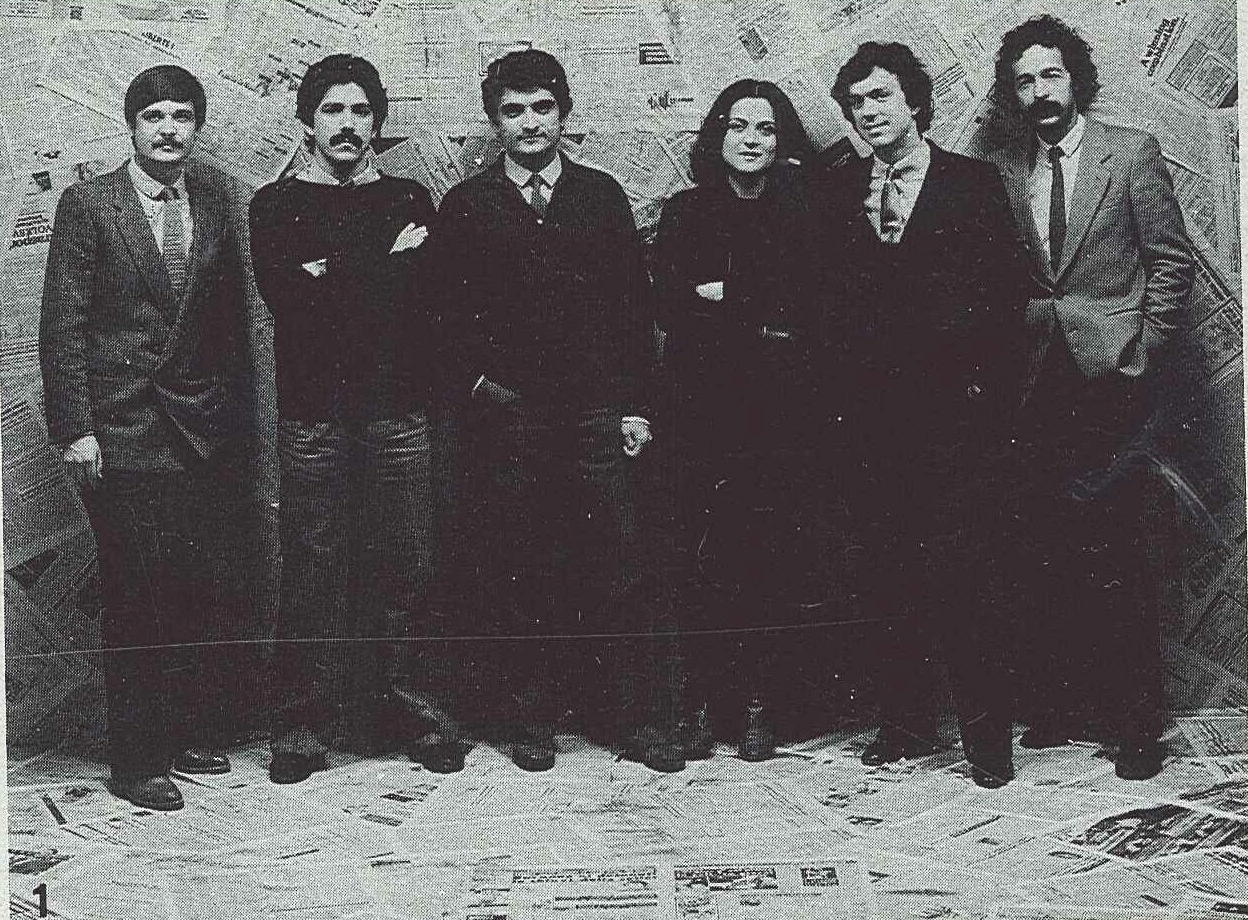
- founding members of STUDIODADA in 1981. From left to right: Dario Ferrari, Paolo Francesco Piva, Maurizio Maggi, Ada Alberti, Marco Piva, and Patrizio Corno.
- Carpets, tiling program developed in cooperation with Olivetti. Design by Ada Alberti, STUDIODADA.

STUDIODADA was an Italian architectural and design office which started in 1977 during Italy's radical period. It completed interior design and architecture projects in Italy and abroad. It ceased to operate in 1988.

== History ==
The firm was founded by six architects: Ada Alberti, Dario Ferrari, Patrizio Corno, Maurizio Maggi, Marco Piva, and Paolo Francesco Piva. In 1980 it took part in the competition held at the Triennale di Milano entitled " L’interno dopo la forma dell’utile" (Interior space after the form of usefulness). That was the beginning of its activity in design field.

In the field of product design, STUDIODADA members have designed for companies such a Luciano Marcato, Brunati, Interior ceramiche, Stilnovo, Tecnodada, Villeroy & Boch, Felice Rossi and Egoluce.

STUDIODADA also promoted some exhibitions to explain its point of view on design such as "Architetture mobili" (movable architectures) (1982), "Design della notte" (design of the night), and others.

== Computer design ==
The 1980s saw the introduction of "computer assisted drafting" and STUDIODADA saw the immediate opportunity to use CAD assistance in project development, both for design and architecture realizing the potential to managing design projects with software assistance.

At Farbe Design in Stuttgart in 1983, they presented, in collaboration with Olivetti, one of the first examples of a computerised system for ceramic tiles linked with an automatic order-management system.

From that experience, they founded TECNODADA a service office where professional could have had the possibility to find solutions for their jobs, as for materials o procedures to use them. TECNODADA also produced some furnitures a book case and a table called "Carpi" and a sofa table called "On The Road."

In 1988, some of the members left STUDIODADA, and the office were closed the next year.

== Gallery ==
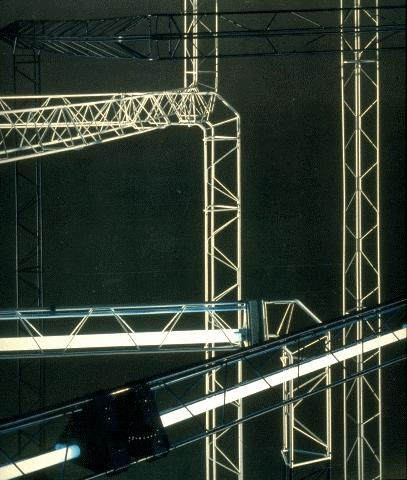
"Skyline," design by Paolo Francesco Piva, STUDIODADA for Stefano Cevoli 1982.

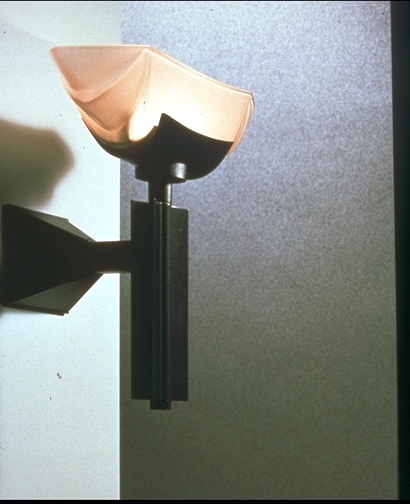
"Sakè," wall lamp design by Marco & Paolo Francesco Piva, STUDIODADA for Stilnovo 1989.

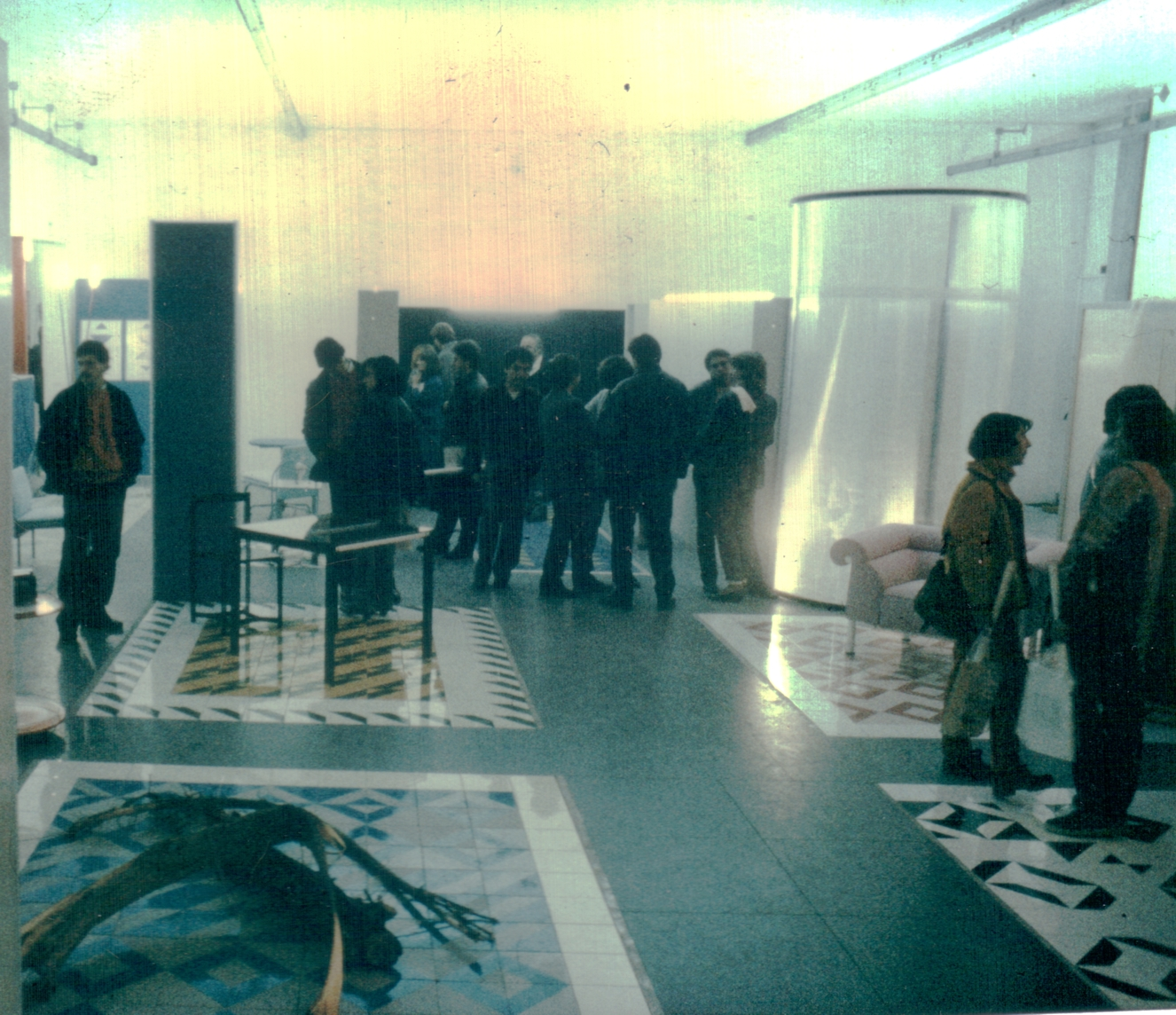
"Architetture mobili." STUDIODADA exhibition, Cesena in 1982.

STUDIODADA references on the web
