= Luxembourg High Security Hub =

Large art storage facility

Coordinates: 49.6398°N 6.222°E

- Company type: S.A. (corporation)
- Industry: Freeport
- Founded: 01.08.2012
- Headquarters: Senningerberg, Luxembourg
- Key people: David Arendt, Managing Director.
- Website: lux-hsh.com/luxembourg

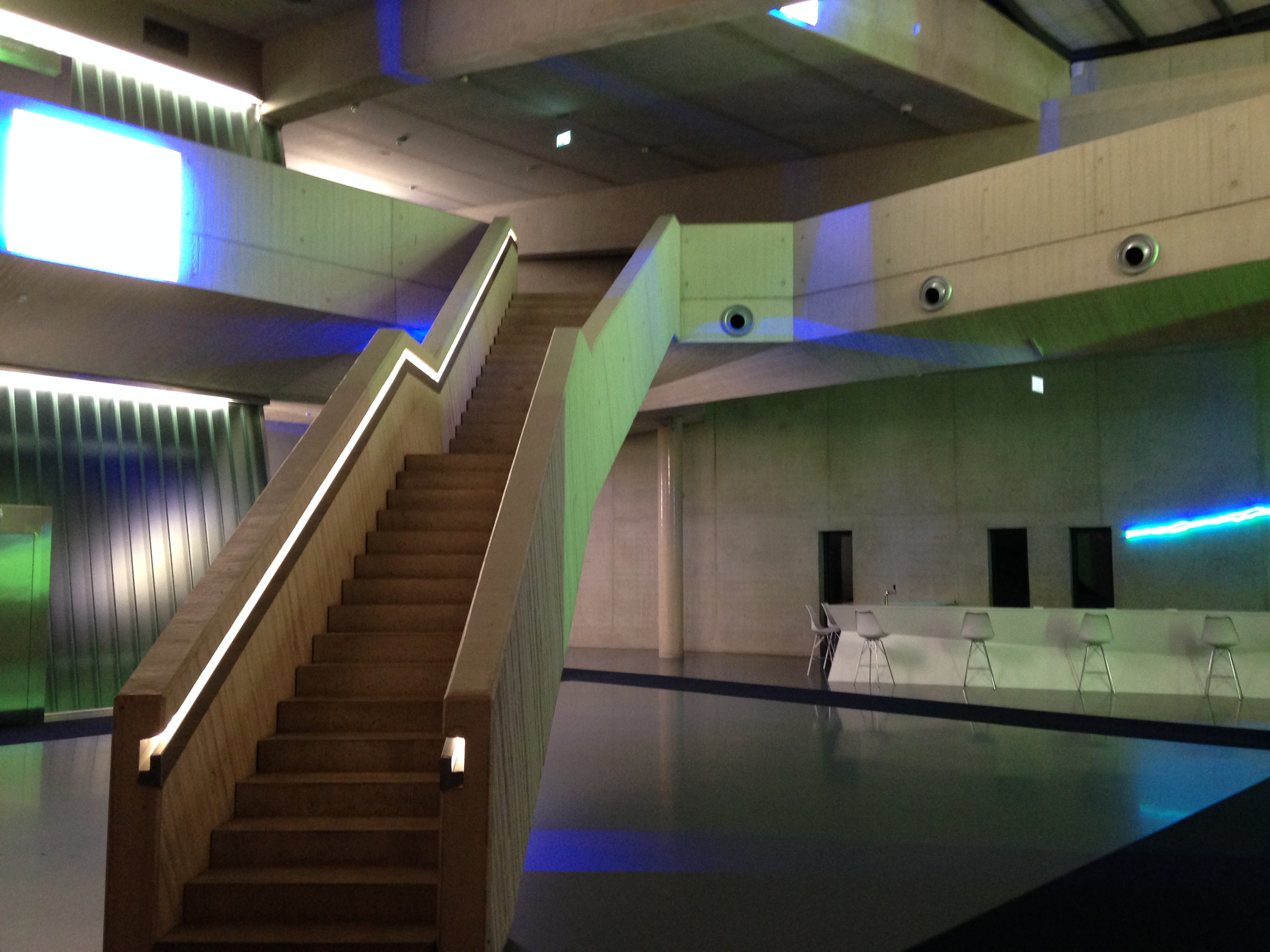
The main hall

Luxembourg High Security Hub, until 2021 known as Luxembourg Freeport, is a €50-million high security storage facility adjacent to Luxembourg Findel Airport. The freeport opened in September 2014.

== The building ==
The building was designed by Atelier d'Architecture 3BM3, with interior design by Johanna Grawunder. The atrium includes a large mural by the Portuguese artist Vhils, etched into one of the concrete walls.

Luxembourg Freeport provides temperature and humidity controlled storage for works of art and other valuables.

Security for the facility is primarily provided by a security system which includes more than 300 CCTV cameras. Also part of the overall security infrastructure is a fire protection system that "sucks oxygen from the atmosphere" rather than using water that might damage works of art. The facility is surrounded by walls topped with barbed wire and the four bullion rooms have 50-cm thick metal doors. There are also four special climate-controlled rooms capable of storing up to 700,000 bottles of wine.

== Attractions ==
According to The Economist, the "attractions are similar to those offered by offshore financial centres: security and confidentiality, not much scrutiny, the ability for owners to hide behind nominees, and an array of tax advantages."

Apart from security, the attraction for customers is that they can store and trade works of art and other valuable items without having to pay customs or sales tax. Tax-free status is possible because the items stored at the facility are technically "in transit". As the Freeport's back doors open directly onto the airport, anything therein is deemed not to have actually yet entered Luxembourg.

== Ownership ==
The Luxembourg High Security Hub, formerly known as the Luxembourg Freeport, was founded in 2014 by Swiss businessman and art dealer Yves Bouvier. Modeled after similar facilities in Geneva and Singapore, the freeport was established to provide high-security, tax-exempt storage for art, precious metals, and luxury goods near Luxembourg Findel Airport. Tony Reynard, chairman of Bouvier’s Singapore freeport, described the move to Luxembourg as a response to capacity limits in Geneva and noted the advantage of proximity to an airport with cargo-handling capabilities. Bouvier was one of three people arrested in Monaco in February 2015 on suspicion of fraud through the sale of works of art at inflated prices or with fake documentation, which has put his freeports under political scrutiny. Initially controlled by Bouvier, the Freeport's shareholder list also included Olivier Thomas, a French art dealer and former president of the facility’s board, and Jean-Marc Peretti, a former Paris gaming club manager linked to money laundering investigations and ties with Corsican mafia. Peretti was also actively involved in negotiating key deals, including the acquisition of Salvator Mundi, and later went on to open an art gallery in Geneva with Bouvier’s support.

In late 2023, Yves Bouvier sold 100% of his shares in the Luxembourg Freeport to Olivier Thomas through Colombe Investment, a Luxembourg-based holding company. According to the facility's CEO, Philippe Dauvergne, the shareholders - past or present - have had no involvement in daily operations, which are governed by strict anti-money laundering and customs compliance protocols.

== Criticism ==
In 2018, the Freeport came under criticism for its lack of transparency from two members of the European Parliament, Ana Gomes and Evelyn Regner. Tasked with investigating money laundering and tax evasion in the EU between 2015 and 2017, they concluded in their final report that freeports "offer offshore storage solutions that can promote money laundering and tax concealment". Furthermore, a European Commission study in 2018 concluded that demand for freeports was increasing just as banks began to crackdown on illegal financial activities, and that their lack of regulation was making them "conducive to secrecy". The report cited the Bouvier Affair, in which Luxembourg freeport owner Yves Bouvier "allegedly defrauded clients by misrepresenting the cost of artworks and subsequently overcharging them."

In January 2019, German MEP Wolf Klinz wrote a letter to European Commission President Jean-Claude Juncker demanding he take action to close loopholes that allow financial crimes to be committed in the European Union. In the letter, Klinz referred specifically to the Luxembourg freeport, stating that the freeport had "been alleged to be a fertile ground for money laundering and tax evasion." The facility was described as a "black hole" for storing goods away out of the authorities’ reach, and MEPs subsequently called for freeports to be banned within the EU.

However, the freeport's management has disputed these allegations, arguing that it surpasses EU regulations in financial controls. Instead, the management stated that the freeport is primarily used for its policy to provide insurance premium reductions, rather than tax evasion.
