= Palazzo del Touring Club Italiano =

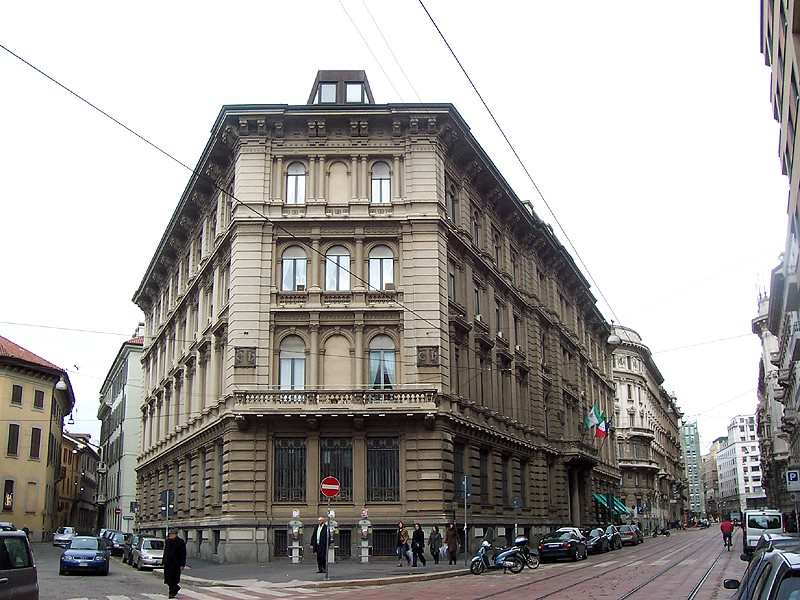
- Palazzo del Touring Club Italiano in Milan
- Click on the map for a fullscreen view

General information
- Architectural style: Eclectic
- Location: Milan, Italy
- Coordinates: 45°27′32.4″N 9°11′15.5″E

Design and construction
- Architect(s): Achille Binda

The Palazzo del Touring Club Italiano, also known as Palazzo Bertarelli, is a historic building situated in Milan, Italy.

== History ==
The building was designed by Achille Binda to house the new seat of the Touring Club Italiano. Construction works started in 1914 and were completed in 1915.

In 2021, the building was converted into a five-star Radisson hotel, the Radisson Collection Hotel, Palazzo Touring Club Milan.

== Description ==
The building occupies a triangular-shaped block delimited by the major thoroughfare of Corso Italia and by the smaller Via Amedei and Via Giuseppe Barellai. It features an ornate eclectic style. The façades are characterized by rich and elaborate ornamentation, including columns and arched windows. Some bronze sculptures depicting Touring Club Italiano founder Luigi Vittorio Bertarelli and other former club presidents can be found in the main hall of the building.
