= Superstudio =

Architectural firm (1966-78)

Superstudio was an architectural firm, founded in 1966 in Florence, Italy by Adolfo Natalini and Cristiano Toraldo di Francia. Gian Piero Frassinelli, Alessandro, and Roberto Magris, Alessandro Poli later joined.

== History ==
Superstudio was a major part of the Radical architecture and design movement of the late 1960s. The founders had studied at the University of Florence with Archizoom Associati founder Andrea Branzi and first showed their work in the Superarchitettura show in 1966. This exhibition became the manifesto of the Radical Design movement.

In 1967, Natalini established three categories of future research: “architecture of the monument”, “architecture of the image”, and “technomorphic architecture”.In 1969, Superstudio presented one of its most famous conceptual architecture works – Continuous Monument: An Architectural Model for Total Urbanization. Their anti-architectural proposals used grid systems as a way to mediate space. Continuous Monument represented a critique of the urban planning at that time.

Superstudio aimed for social change through architecture. In the early 1970s, they created a series of films in order to raise awareness of the harmful impact of construction on natural environment.

Adolfo Natalini wrote in 1971 “...if design is merely an inducement to consume, then we must reject design; if architecture is merely the codifying of bourgeois model of ownership and society, then we must reject architecture; if architecture and town planning is merely the formalization of present unjust social divisions, then we must reject town planning and its cities...until all design activities are aimed towards meeting primary needs. Until then, design must disappear. We can live without architecture..." Through their models, Superstudio proposed an alternative strategy of life without objects, a view of architectural practice as essentially theoretical, with a primary focus on cultural criticism.

In 1970, they created their iconic minimalist furniture collection – Quaderna, which is still in production by Zanotta. Their other famous projects include: "Sofo Sofa" (1968) (still in production), "Sofa Bazaar" (1968), Passiflora Table Lamp (1966), Polaris Excelsior table lamp (1968).

Superstudio took part in the MoMA exhibition "Italy: The New Domestic Landscape" (1972).

Critics agree that the work of Superstudio was influential, or even entirely inspirational to, among others, architects like Zaha Hadid, Rem Koolhaas and Bernard Tschumi. Evidence of this is notable when one considers that the use of strong symmetrical line-work and geometric form; mediums utilized by all of these architects, became staples of Superstudio's. Furthermore, Superstudio's penchant for envisioning immense, entirely aspirational mega-structures is a trait visible in the early work of architects such as Hadid and Koolhaas.

Superstudio was disbanded in 1978, but its members continued to develop their ideas independently through their writings, via education, architectural practice and other design projects.

== Publications ==
- Didero, Maria Cristina; Rossi, Catharine; Snyderman, Evan; Sudjic, Deyan (2017). Superdesign: Italian radical design 1965-75. New York, NY. ISBN 978-1-58093-495-4. OCLC 970024068.
