= Archizoom Associati =

Italian architectural group

Archizoom Associati was a design studio from Florence, Italy. The founders were Andrea Branzi (architect and designer), Gilberto Corretti (architect and designer), Paolo Deganello (architect and designer) and Massimo Morozzi (architect and designer). In 1968 the group was joined by Dario Bartolini (designer) and Lucia Bartolini (designer).

== History ==
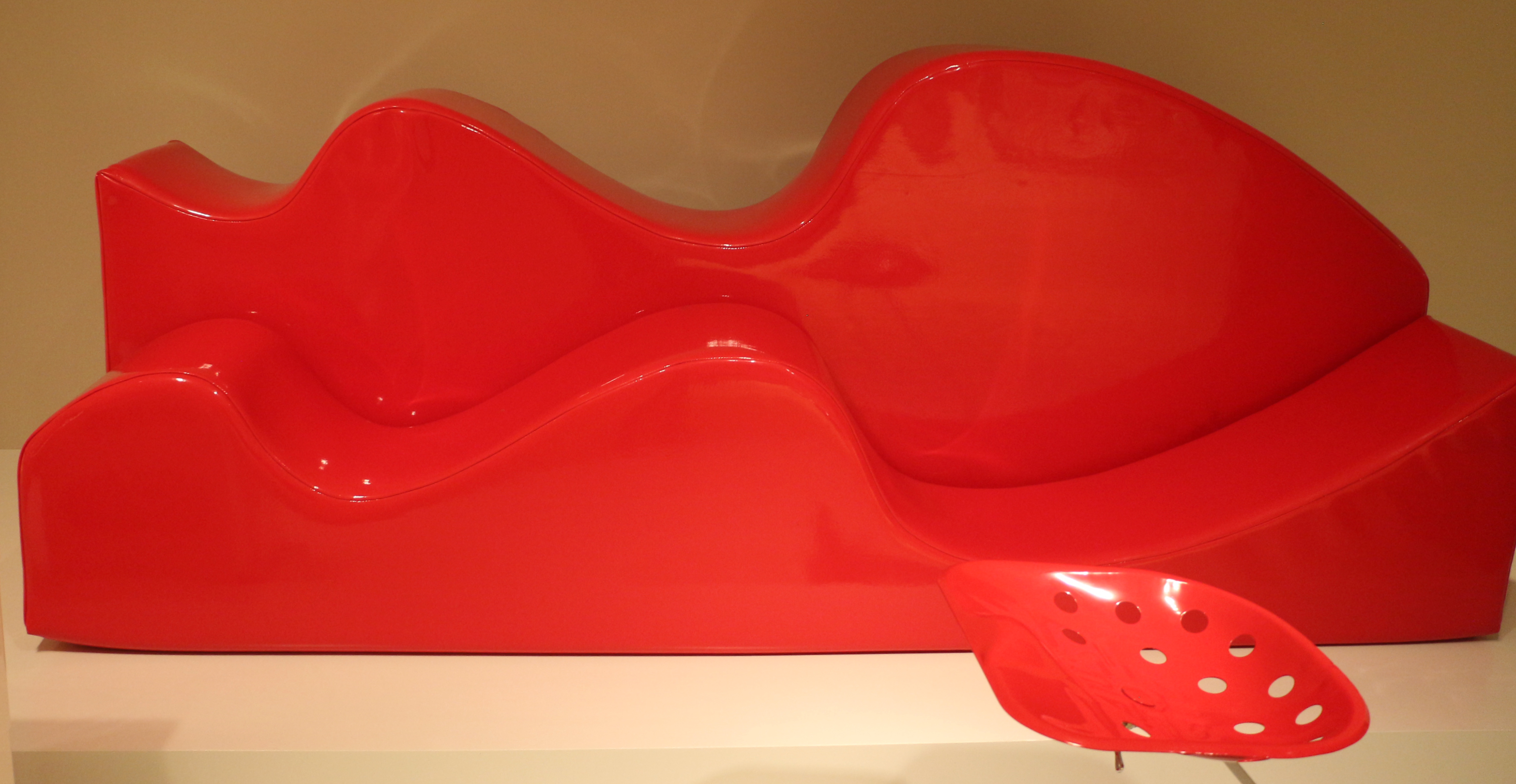
Archizoom for Poltronova, Sofa Superonda, 1967

Archizoom organized its first exhibition "Superarchitettura" in December 1966 along with Superstudio. The exhibition featured projections and prototypes and advanced the concept of radical anti-design as dynamic sofa Superonda (conception by Andrea Branzi) produced by Poltronova. During 1967 Archizoom remained in the exhibitions as "Super Architettura 2" and "Modena" that brought the concept of kitsch dorms titled "dream beds".

Until its dissolution in 1974, the group worked on projects of modernist vision such as the theoretical metropolis "No-Stop City".

== Style ==
The team produced a rich series of projects in design, architecture and large scale urban visions, a work which is still a fundamental source of inspiration for generations to come.

"No-Stop City" featured flexible interior products and places directed to a polychronic environment and construction activities in the city.

Archizoom coinvented "Superarchitecture", endorsing creative processes drawing Pop in architecture and design development, exemplified by objects such as the "Superonda"-sofa, which invited unconventional postures by its waved shape.

Dream Beds and Gazebos were results of "Superarchitecture" transformed into a productive system, which by the creation of eclectic objects and kitsch, attempted the critical destruction of functionalist heritage and the spatial concept of the modern movement.
