= List of people in blockchain technology =

This is a list of people in blockchain technology, people who do work in the area of Blockchain and Cryptocurrency, in particular researchers, business people, and authors.

Some people that are notable as programmers are included here because they work in research as well as programming. A few of these people pre-date the invention of this technology; they are now regarded as people in blockchain technology because their work can be seen as leading to the invention of this technology.

== A ==
- Gavin Andresen, former Bitcoin lead developer
- Andreas Antonopoulos, author of Mastering Bitcoin
- Jeremy Allaire, CEO and founder of the digital currency company Circle and Chairman of the Board of Brightcove

== B ==
- Brian Behlendorf, Executive Director of Hyperledger Project
- Brendan Blumer, CEO of Block.One
- Vitalik Buterin, founder of Ethereum
- Adam Back, author of Hashcash and CEO of Blockstream

== C ==
- Wences Casares, CEO of Xapo
- David Chaum, computer scientist, cryptographer and blockchain pioneer.

== D ==
- Wei Dai, creator of b-money; inspired the creation of Bitcoin by Satoshi Nakamoto

== F ==
- Hal Finney, the recipient of the first Bitcoin transaction

== G ==
- Tony Gallippi, founder of BitPay, a global bitcoin payment service provider.
- Brad Garlinghouse, CEO of Ripple Labs
- Kofi Genfi, co-founder of Mazzuma
- David Gerard, author of Attack of the 50-foot Blockchain in 2017.

== H ==
- Charles Hoskinson, co-founder of Ethereum and founder of Cardano

== I ==
- Ruja Ignatova, founder of OneCoin, a pyramid scheme promoted as a cryptocurrency.

== K ==
- Dave Kleiman associated with Craig Wright

== L ==
- Chris Larsen, CEO of Ripple

== M ==
- Blythe Masters, CEO of Digital Asset Holdings
- Silvio Micali, professor at the Massachusetts Institute of Technology and founder of Algorand

== N ==
- Satoshi Nakamoto, the name used by the unknown person or people who designed bitcoin
- Nii Osae Osae Dade, co-founder of Mazzuma

== R ==
- Keonne Rodriguez, software developer convicted for unlicensed money transmission

== S ==
- Emin Gün Sirer, professor at Cornell University, who studies distributed and peer-to-peer systems
- Jorge Stolfi, Brazilian professor at the University of Campinas, cryptocurrency skeptic
- Nick Szabo, computer scientist, cryptographer, and legal scholar known for his research in digital contracts currencies.

== T ==
- Alex Tapscott, co-author of Blockchain Revolution, CEO and founder of Northwest Passage Ventures, an advisory firm for early-stage blockchain companies
- Don Tapscott, co-author of Blockchain Revolution, CEO of Tapscott Group, co-founder of Blockchain Research Institute

== V ==
- Roger Ver, Bitcoin Foundation co-founder, promoter of Bitcoin Cash

== W ==
- Zooko Wilcox-O'Hearn, creator of the crypto coin, Zcash
- Gavin Wood, co-founder of Ethereum
- Jihan Wu, co-founder of Bitmain

== Z ==
- Micree Zhan, co-founder of Bitmain
- Changpeng Zhao, founder of exchange Binance

== See also ==
- Blockchain
- Bitcoin
- List of bitcoin companies
