= Bitcoin Satoshi Vision =

Hard cryptocurrency fork of Bitcoin Cash

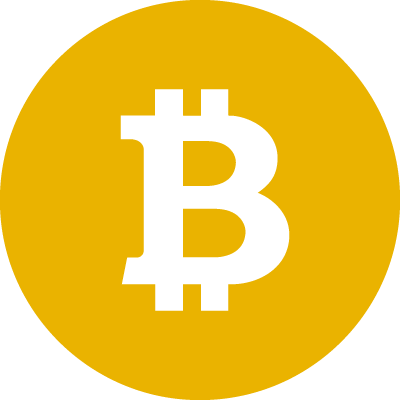

Denominations
- Symbol: ₿
- Code: BSV
- Precision: 10⁻⁸

Development
- Project fork of: Bitcoin Cash

Ledger
- Split height: #556766 / 15 November 2018
- Timestamping scheme: Proof-of-work
- Block reward: 3.125 BSV
- Block time: 10 minutes
- Circulating supply: 18,874,300 BSV (2021-10-20)
- Supply limit: 21,000,000

Website
- Website: www.bitcoinsv.com

Bitcoin Satoshi Vision (BSV) is a cryptocurrency that is a hard fork of Bitcoin Cash. Bitcoin Satoshi Vision was created in November 2018 by a group of individuals led by Craig Steven Wright, who has claimed since 2015 to be Satoshi Nakamoto, the creator of the original Bitcoin.

== History ==
=== 2018 split from Bitcoin Cash ===
On 15 November 2018, a hard fork chain split of Bitcoin Cash occurred between two rival factions called Bitcoin Cash and Bitcoin SV. On 15 November 2018 Bitcoin Cash traded at about $289, and Bitcoin SV traded at about $96.50, down from $425.01 on 14 November for the un-split Bitcoin Cash.

The split originated from what was described as a "civil war" in two competing Bitcoin Cash camps. The first camp, supported by entrepreneur Roger Ver and Jihan Wu of Bitmain, promoted the software entitled Bitcoin ABC (short for Adjustable Blocksize Cap), which would maintain the block size at 32 MB. The second camp led by Craig Steven Wright and billionaire Calvin Ayre put forth a competing software version Bitcoin SV, short for "Bitcoin Satoshi Vision", which would increase the block size limit to 128 MB.

=== 2019 de-listing from Binance ===
In April 2019, an online feud broke out between those who supported the claims of Bitcoin SV supporter Craig Wright that he was Satoshi Nakamoto, and those who did not. The feud resulted in cryptocurrency exchange Binance de-listing Bitcoin SV from their platform, stating that:

At Binance, we periodically review each digital asset we list to ensure that it continues to meet the high level of standard we expect. When a coin or token no longer meets this standard, or the industry changes, we conduct a more in-depth review and potentially delist it. We believe this best protects all of our users.

When we conduct these reviews, we consider a variety of factors. Here are some that drive whether we decide to delist a digital asset:

- Commitment of team to project
- Level and quality of development activity
- Network / smart contract stability
- Level of public communication
- Responsiveness to our periodic due diligence requests
- Evidence of unethical / fraudulent conduct
- Contribution to a healthy and sustainable crypto ecosystem

=== 2021 network attack ===
In August 2021, Bitcoin SV suffered a 51% attack, after previously suffering attacks in June and July of the same year. Such an attack involves cryptocurrency miners gaining control of more than half of a network's computing power; these kinds of network attacks have the goal of preventing new transactions from gaining confirmations, allowing the attackers to double-spend coins. Adam James, senior editor at OKEx Insights claimed that "In the intermediate term, the attack has seemingly somewhat-negligible impact on its current price action," however "Faith in [Bitcoin SV] will likely be reduced following the incident."

=== 2024 high court ruling ===
In March 2024, Mr Justice James Mellor in the British High Court ruled that Wright is not Satoshi Nakamoto.

== See also ==
- Bitcoin scalability problem
- List of bitcoin forks
- List of cryptocurrencies
