= BIT (company) =

Singaporean financial services company

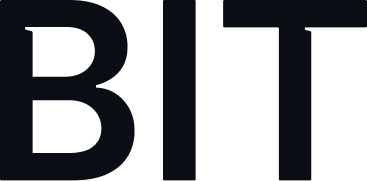
- Formerly: Matrixport (2019–2026)
- Type: Private
- Industry: Financial services Digital asset / cryptocurrency
- Founded: 2019; 7 years ago
- Founders: Wu Jihan; Ge Yuesheng (John Ge)
- Headquarters: Singapore, Singapore
- Area served: Worldwide
- Services: Cryptocurrency custody; Trading; Asset management; Wealth management; Institutional services
- Website: bit.com

BIT (formerly Matrixport) is a Singapore-headquartered digital asset financial services company that provides cryptocurrency custody, trading, asset and wealth management, and related institutional services. The company was founded in 2019 by Wu Jihan and Ge Yuesheng (also known as John Ge) as a spin-off from the bitcoin mining hardware manufacturer Bitmain, of which Wu was a co-founder. In March 2026, the company rebranded from Matrixport to BIT.

== History ==
Matrixport was founded in February 2019 in Singapore by Wu Jihan, a co-founder and former co-chairman of Bitmain Technologies, together with Ge Yuesheng, a former Bitmain executive. The company was established as a separate venture from Bitmain amid financial and leadership difficulties at the mining hardware maker, and it initially focused on offering cryptocurrency custody, trading, and lending services to institutional and high-net-worth clients. Wu has served as the company's chairman and Ge as chief executive officer since founding.

Following the collapse of several crypto lenders and exchanges in 2022, Ge publicly called for stronger cryptocurrency regulation to restore market confidence.

== Swiss operations ==
On 30 September 2024, Matrixport completed an all-cash acquisition of Crypto Finance (Asset Management) AG, a Swiss crypto asset manager that had been part of the Deutsche Börse-owned Crypto Finance Group, and renamed it Matrixport Asset Management AG. The unit, supervised by the Swiss Financial Market Supervisory Authority (FINMA), managed the first crypto fund approved by the regulator. Following the group's 2026 rebranding, the wholly owned subsidiary was renamed BIT Asset Management AG.

On 20 October 2026, FINMA announced that it had approved Switzerland's first exchange-traded fund investing directly in bitcoin and open to retail investors, granting an exemption from its risk-diversification rules for the single-asset fund. FINMA did not name the issuer in its announcement; BIT Asset Management subsequently confirmed that the approved product was its Bitcoin Fund ETF (ticker: BBIT), structured as a Swiss collective investment scheme. The company said it expected trading on the SIX Swiss Exchange to begin around mid-November 2026.

== See also ==
- Bitmain
- Wu Jihan
- Cryptocurrency exchange
