= Bitdeer =

Singapore-based cryptocurrency mining and AI cloud infrastructure company

Bitdeer Technologies Group
- Type: Public
- Traded as: Nasdaq: BTDR
- Industry: Data centers
- Founded: January 2021; 5 years ago in Singapore
- Founder: Jihan Wu
- Headquarters: Singapore
- Area served: United States, Norway, Bhutan
- Key people: Jihan Wu (Executive chairman and CEO)
- Services: AI Cloud
- Revenue: US$620,253,000 (2025)
- Number of employees: 471 (2025)
- Website: bitdeer.com

Bitdeer Technologies Group, or simply Bitdeer, is a cryptocurrency mining and artificial intelligence (AI) cloud infrastructure company headquartered in Singapore and listed on the Nasdaq under the ticker BTDR. The company was spun off from bitcoin-mining chip producer Bitmain in January 2021 by founder Jihan Wu. Bitdeer is among the largest cryptocurrency miners by computing power and operates data centers in the United States, Norway, and Bhutan, with U.S. headquarters in San Jose, California. Since 2023, the company has expanded into AI cloud services through a partnership with Nvidia and through the conversion of cryptocurrency mining facilities for AI workloads.

== History ==
In January 2021, Bitdeer was spun off from the bitcoin-mining chip producer Bitmain, which was co-founded by entrepreneur Jihan Wu in 2013. After the spin-off, Bitdeer established its headquarters in Singapore, where Wu resides. Wu has served as Bitdeer's executive chairman since the spin-off and is also its chief executive officer.

In November 2021, Bitdeer announced plans to merge with Blue Safari Group Acquisition Corp. and file an initial public offering. After a delayed merger with the special-purpose acquisition company, Bitdeer was listed on the Nasdaq in April 2023 at a valuation of $1.18 billion. In June 2023, Bitdeer announced plans to repurchase as much as $1 million worth of its stock. The company had 211 employees and earned S$485,975,304 in 2023.

In 2022, Bitdeer acquired the high-security storage facility Le Freeport in Singapore for S$40 million (US$28.4 million).

In May 2024, Tether acquired a $100 million stake in Bitdeer through a private placement.

In April 2026, Bitdeer introduced the SEALMINER A4 series of bitcoin mining application-specific integrated circuit chips, designed to improve energy efficiency for large-scale mining operations.

== Data centers and mining operations ==
In 2022, Bitdeer sought to raise $200 million from outside investors to purchase discounted hardware. By 2023, the company operated five data centers across the United States and Norway.

=== United States ===
In the United States, Bitdeer operates mining facilities in Tennessee, Texas, Washington, and Ohio.

Bitdeer has been operating a mining facility in East Knoxville, Tennessee since 2018; the facility drew 63 megawatts of power as of 2022. In 2024, the company had approximately 30 employees in Knoxville and was the Knoxville Utilities Board's largest industrial customer, accounting for 9.4 percent of the utility's total electric sales in 2023.

Bitdeer is among the largest cryptocurrency mining operations in Texas. Its mining facility in Rockdale is housed in a former aluminum-smelting plant about an hour from Austin. The facility has participated in the Electric Reliability Council of Texas (ERCOT) to reduce electricity usage during periods of grid stress.

In 2023, Bitdeer purchased 31 acres in Massillon, Ohio to construct a mining facility. In November 2025, a fire broke out at the construction site, damaging two buildings in the complex. The chief of Massillon Fire Department, Matt Heck, determined no signs of arson were determined, though no cause was identified. In April 2026, Bitdeer presented plans for an additional data center facility in Niles, Ohio - a project the company described as a $300 million investment expected to create approximately 50 jobs.

In July 2026, Bitdeer started construction of a manufacturing facility in Sparks, Nevada. The facility will produce circuit boards, server chips, and capacitor resistors for bitcoin mining. The factory is planned to start working in January 2027.

=== Norway ===
Bitdeer operates mining capacity in Norway. In March 2026, the company began converting its 180-megawatt site in Tydal, previously used for cryptocurrency mining, into high-performance computing capacity for AI workloads.

In August 2026, the company leased part of the site's capacity to Volta Infra Holdings under a 16-year agreement valued at US$4.7 billion, backed by $1.3 billion in credit from J.P. Morgan.

=== Bhutan ===
Bitdeer partnered with the government of Bhutan in 2023 to increase mining capacity and create a fund of up to $500 million for green mining operations in the Himalaya kingdom.

== AI cloud platform ==
In November 2023, Bitdeer announced a partnership with Nvidia to develop AI cloud computing services and began construction on its first AI cloud data center in Singapore, branded Bitdeer AI Cloud. The business line uses Bitdeer's existing data center infrastructure, originally built for cryptocurrency mining, to provide GPU computing capacity to enterprise customers. In March 2026, Bitdeer began converting its 180-megawatt Tydal site in Norway from cryptocurrency mining to AI and high-performance computing workloads.
