= Genfi =

Genfi is a surname. Notable people with the surname include:

- Ama Serwah Genfi (born 1994), Ghanaian-American singer-songwriter
- Kofi Genfi (born 1993 or 1994), Ghanaian businessman
- Kwadwo Adu Genfi Amponsah (born 1993), British musician
