= CastleCops =

Volunteer internet security community

CastleCops was a volunteer security community focused on making the Internet a safer place. All services to the public were free, including malware and rootkit cleanup of infected computers, malware and phish investigations and terminations, and searchable database lists of malware and file hashes. It was targeted by spammers throughout its existence but fought back using legal means to defeat them.

== History ==
Education and collaborative information sharing were among CastleCops (formerly known as Computer Cops before the name change in 2005) highest priorities. They had been achieved by training the volunteer staff in their anti-malware, phishing, and rootkit academies and through additional services including CastleCops forums, news, reviews, and continuing education.

CastleCops worked with industry experts and law enforcement to address online security issues. CastleCops reached its five-year anniversary in February 2007, receiving recognition from several figures in the computer security field.

On December 24, 2008, the website announced that "All things come to an end" and that CastleCops has ceased to exist, for an as yet undisclosed reason. It was later reported that the founder, Paul Laudanski, was offered a job with Microsoft. However, the domain name has remained active ever since, albeit with no content, in order to prevent it from being purchased by criminals.

== Malware databases ==
The CastleCops "malware databases", well known in security circles, had already been moved to Systemlookup.com before the demise of the site.

== Notable members ==
- Paul Laudanski
- Kenneth L.Fisher
- Dave Kleiman
- Larry H Stevenson
