= American Bitcoin =

Bitcoin mining and accumulation company

- Type: Public
- Traded as: Nasdaq: ABTC
- Industry: Bitcoin mining
- Incorporated: Delaware
- Founded: March 2025
- Founders: Eric Trump; Donald Trump Jr.
- Headquarters: Miami, Florida, United States
- Key people: Eric Trump (chief strategy officer); Matt Prusak (president)
- Revenue: ▲US$185 million (2025)
- Net income: ▼ −US$153 million (2025)
- Owner: Hut 8 Mining (80 %)
- Website: abtc.com

American Bitcoin Corp is an American bitcoin mining and treasury management company majority owned by digital infrastructure company Hut 8 Mining. It is incorporated in Delaware with its headquarters in Miami, Florida.

== History ==
American Bitcoin was founded in March 2025 by Eric Trump, Donald Trump Jr., and shareholders of their former venture, American Data Centers. Plans for the venture emerged in late 2024 when Hut 8 executives met Eric Trump at the Trump National Golf Club in Jupiter, Florida. Between April and May 31, 2025, the company mined 215 bitcoin and reported it had raised $220 million by July 1, 2025 to fund mining equipment and a strategic bitcoin reserve. Matt Prusak was appointed as the company's first President in 2025.

On 12 May 2025, it was announced that public company Gryphon Digital Mining would merge with American Bitcoin in an all-stock transaction, with the new entity retaining the American Bitcoin name. Shares of Gryphon climbed 285% to $2.00 on the announcement. On September 3, 2025, American Bitcoin began trading on the Nasdaq Global Select Market after a merger with Gryphon Digital Mining.

== Operations ==
American Bitcoin operates mining facilities supplied by Hut 8 in Niagara Falls, Medicine Hat, Alberta and Orla, Texas. As of May 31, 2025, the company operated over sixty thousand ASIC miners and held contractual rights to purchase an additional 17,280 Bitmain machines.

In a September 2025 SEC filing, the company reported holdings of 2,443 bitcoin, valued at approximately $269 million. According to an investor presentation American Bitcoin follows three lines of strategy: operate mining facilities, accumulate bitcoin through mining and open market purchases, and building related services.

== Ownership ==
At launch, Hut 8 owned eighty percent of the equity while the Trump family and American Data Centers shareholders held the remaining twenty percent.
