= David Gerard (author) =

Australian author and Wikipedian (born 1967)

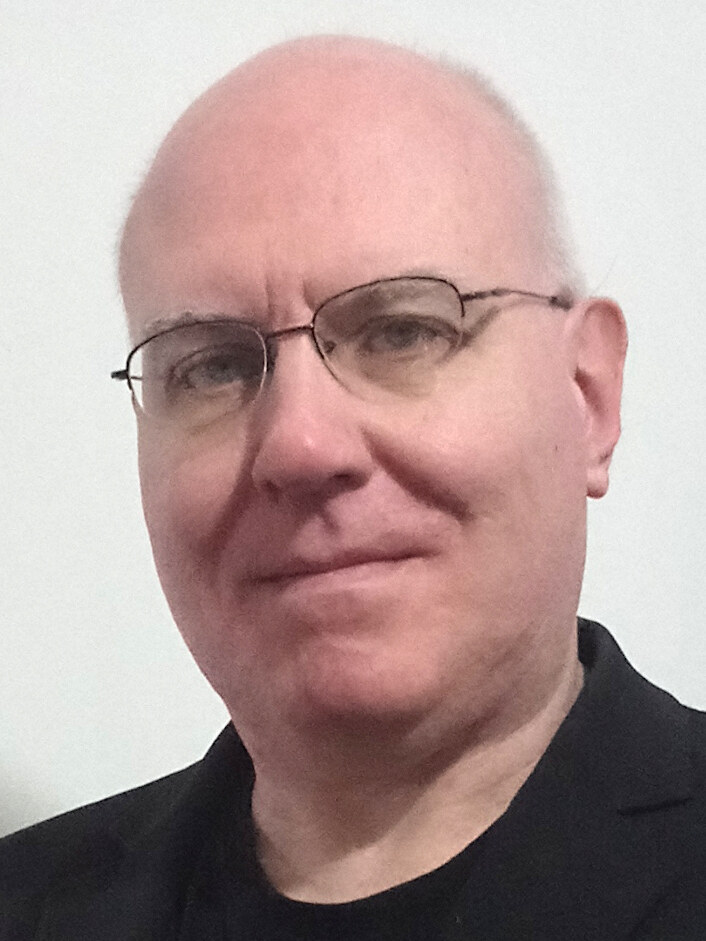
- Gerard in 2020
- Born: 19 February 1967 (age 59); Perth, Western Australia
- Occupation: IT systems administrator
- Known for: Cryptocurrency criticism; Wikipedia volunteering
- Notable work: Attack of the 50-foot Blockchain (2017); Libra Shrugged (2020)
- Spouse: Rose Gerard
- Website: davidgerard.co.uk

David Gerard (born 1967) is an Australian IT systems administrator, finance author and Wikipedia editor, best known as a cryptocurrency sceptic and commentator on cryptocurrencies, non-fungible tokens (NFTs), and related blockchain technologies. He is the author of the cryptocurrency books Attack of the 50-foot Blockchain (2017), and Libra Shrugged (2020).

== Criticism of cryptocurrency ==
In 2017, Gerard released his first book, Attack of the 50-foot Blockchain, which criticises cryptocurrency for, among other reasons, its energy cost and the high number of exchange hacks. Gerard details technological issues with the infrastructure of blockchain applications, including smart contracts, which he describes as neither smart nor legal contracts. Parts of the book are dedicated to debunking claims made by cryptocurrency advocates; for example, he provides evidence that bitcoin has not dispensed with the malfeasance present in traditional banks and markets or helped people rise out of poverty.

Sue Halpern described the book in The New York Review of Books as "a sober riposte to all the upbeat forecasts about cryptocurrency". Martin Walker of the London School of Economics Business Review called the book "the first real, 'no holds barred', attack on the whole bitcoin/cryptocurrency/blockchain movement". Regarding the cryptocurrency bubble, the BBC said, "Attack of the 50 Foot Blockchain is a very convincing takedown of the whole phenomenon." In the American Book Review, Aaron Jaffe recommended it alongside David Golumbia's Politics of Bitcoin: Software as Right-Wing Extremism. In 2021, US investor Mike Burry changed his Twitter image to a quote from Attack of the 50-foot Blockchain: "NFTs exist so that the crypto grifters can have a new kind of magic bean to sell for actual money, and pretend they're not selling magic beans."

In 2020, Gerard released his second book, Libra Shrugged. The book explores Facebook's aborted attempt to create Libra, a cryptocurrency, and discussed reactions to it from central banks.

== Wikipedia editing ==
Gerard has been active as a Wikipedia volunteer since the encyclopedia's early days, and formerly was an administrator on the project.

== Personal life ==
Gerard lives in Greater London with his wife and child.

== See also ==
- List of people in blockchain technology
- List of Wikipedia people
- Molly White, Wikipedia editor and cryptocurrency sceptic
