= Calvin Ayre =

Canadian-Antiguan entrepreneur

- Calvin Ayre in 2026
- Born: Calvin Edward Ayre; May 25, 1961 (age 65); Lloydminster, Saskatchewan, Canada
- Education: Bachelor of Science, University of Waterloo; MBA, City University of Seattle
- Known for: founding the Ayre Group and launching the Bodog entertainment company
- Title: Special Economic Envoy to the Government of Antigua and Barbuda
- Board member of: Calvin Ayre Foundation
- Website: ayre.group

Calvin Edward Ayre (born 25 May 1961) is a Canadian-Antiguan entrepreneur based in Antigua and Barbuda. He is the founder of the Ayre Group and Bodog entertainment brand.

In 2000, Ayre launched online gambling company Bodog, the success of which made him a billionaire. Ayre's profile increased in the mid-2000s as online gaming's popularity surged, landing him on the cover of Forbes magazine's 2006 annual Billionaires edition and Star magazine's "Most Eligible Billionaire Bachelors" list in late 2007.

In 2012, Ayre was indicted by the US Attorney for Maryland on charges of illegal gambling. Despite the Antiguan government's view that the charges against Ayre were "completely contrary to binding international agreements," in 2017, he pled guilty to a single misdemeanor charge and all other charges against him were dropped. In August 2017, Ayre was appointed as an Economic Envoy for Antigua and Barbuda to advise on developments in blockchain technology.

== Early life ==
Ayre grew up on a farm outside Lloydminster, Saskatchewan and graduated from high school in Salmon Arm, British Columbia. His parents were grain and pig farmers. Ayre excelled in school, winning three academic scholarships in his senior year of high school, including scoring the highest marks in his class on the scholarship exams. In 1984, he received a Bachelor of Science (BSc) in general sciences from the University of Waterloo, adding an MBA in management finance from City University of Seattle in 1989.

== Career ==
In 1992, after reading a newspaper article about a Caribbean-based company offering betting services over the telephone, Ayre concluded that gambling was tailor-made for the internet. Having taught himself network design by studying Cisco Systems manuals, Ayre converted his Vancouver-based Internet incubator company into a software support firm for online gambling, which became Bodog. He was able to license his software to several online casinos but soon realized the real money was in running his own gaming operation. His gambling business was set up in 1996 and was based in Costa Rica. Bodog.com was established in 2000.

Canadian Business reported "the Bodog name is part of an ambitious branding strategy that Ayre envisioned from the start. He came up with it while typing potential brand names into an Internet domain-registration search engine one night. He chose the appellation like a major corporation would pick the name of a new car or brand of soft drink: it had to have six letters or less, be easy to spell and remember, have some personality and be unlike any competitor's moniker. The last criterion was easy to fill since most of Bodog's rivals prefer straightforward brand names such as PartyPoker.com or Sportsbook.com." As the face of the Bodog brand, Ayre's public profile increased in the mid-2000s. He was featured as the cover story for Forbes 2006 annual Billionaires edition. and Star magazine's "Most Eligible Billionaire Bachelors" list in late 2007.

Ayre himself was the focus of Bodog's marketing strategy, creating a public profile around a jackpot-winning lifestyle. He hosted parties in Costa Rica and Antigua, with bikini-clad "Bodog Girls" and armed bodyguards in attendance, and the media noted his reputation as a man who likes to party. The Bodog website and press materials are filled with photographs of Ayre drinking on yachts with scantily clad models and partying with celebrities. Ayre claims that the ‘bad boy adventurer’ image projected in Bodog marketing only worked because it was based on something genuine. "The lifestyle I sell is about 80% the reality of what I live." The business expanded rapidly, recording turnover of US$7,300,000,000 and revenue of US$210,000,000 in 2005. As Bodog grew in prominence, Ayre appeared on episodes of MTV Cribs, VH1's Fabulous Life of…, Extra, and ABC Nightline. In 2006, Ayre was named one of People magazine's 40 hottest bachelors and appeared on the cover of the Forbes Billionaires issue. Also in 2006, the online gambling industry underwent realignment as US authorities made high-profile arrests of several online gambling executives. Ayre sold Bodog's US-facing online gambling business to the Morris Mohawk Gaming Group of Kahnawake, Quebec, with Ayre retaining rights to the Bodog brand. He subsequently announced his retirement from the online gambling business.

In a 2009 interview, Ayre stated that following the passage of the Unlawful Internet Gambling Enforcement Act (UIGEA) in 2006, the organization that he led and that had been accepting customers from the United States withdrew from that market, instead licensing the brand to the Morris Mohawk Gaming Group, which then operated its own online gaming website servicing the US under the Bodog brand until December, 2011. On 14 December 2011 MMGG announced that it would no longer operate Bodog-branded websites and transitioned all customers to its new site.

The news media has also reported on Bodog's alleged skirting of Internet gambling laws in the United States and other countries. Forbes reported his "taunting analysis of the law: we run a business that can't actually be described as gambling in each country we operate in. But when you add it all together, it's Internet gambling." In a 2006 feature, The Register called Ayre "something of an outlaw."

On 17 February 2026, Bodog rebranded as Ozoon.

On August 13, 2026, Calvin announced on his X account https://x.com/CalvinAyre that he "licensed the brand to a content company that spent the past three months building a media platform focused on a number of sectors (sports, technology, travel, wellness and, yes, gaming)" for a relaunch of Bodog.com.

=== Expansion beyond gambling ===
Ayre expressed his admiration for Virgin Group founder Richard Branson’s use of his personal brand to promote his companies. Using him as a model, Ayre sought to build Bodog into an online gambling brand and a "mainstream 21st-century digital entertainment conglomerate". As Bodog grew, Ayre launched several non-gaming properties under the Bodog brand.

In 2003, Ayre organized BodogConference.com in Las Vegas for sports handicappers, at which National Football League Hall of Fame quarterback Joe Montana was a special guest. The conference became an annual event, attracting gambling industry executives and figures from the sports world. In 2005, Ayre launched the Bodog Music record label. This led to the Bodog Music Battle of the Bands television series on Fuse TV, in which celebrity judges including former Sex Pistols singer John Lydon traveled across America to find the country's best unsigned bands.

Ayre also launched Calvin Ayre WildCard Poker, a televised poker series on Fox Sports Net featuring pro and celebrity players facing off against online qualifiers. In March 2006, filming of party scenes for the first-season finale at Ayre's compound outside San Jose, Costa Rica, was raided by an estimated 100 police who were under the mistaken impression gambling was taking place. Ayre, who was not charged, used the media spotlight provided by the raid to promote the series and the Bodog brand. He made light of the raid, claiming the police "ate half my buffet."

Bodog branched out into sports with the launch of Bodog Fight, a mixed martial arts league incorporating a television series and live pay-per-view events.

=== Bitcoin involvement ===
In June 2016, Andrew O'Hagan published a writer's account of the background behind Craig Wright publicly asserting himself to be Satoshi Nakamoto, the inventor of Bitcoin cryptocurrency, which made the news in May 2016. He revealed Ayre to be part of the business operation behind this affair, possibly even its ultimate organizer and the financial backer of the $30 million acquisition and development of Craig Wright's assets. In August 2017, Ayre acquired cryptocurrency news site Coingeek.com.

As of 2018, Ayre is involved with the BSV Blockchain.

In 2020, Ayre sold his Bitcoin mining operations to Canadian firm TAAL Distributed Information Technologies Inc. In April 2021, Ayre Group Ventures invested in Mijem Inc., a Canada-based social media and technology company. The investment aimed to support Mijem's growth, including implementing a Bitcoin SV-based cashback system. In 2023, Ayre Group acquired a controlling interest in nChain, a blockchain and web3 IP library.

Ayre briefly supported the Bitcoin Cash (BCH) blockchain but withdrew his support in 2018 because the chain was preparing to make changes to the protocol that Ayre opposed. Ayre maintains that although Bitcoin SV (Satoshi Vision) trades under the ticker BSV, it is the original Bitcoin protocol because it hasn't undergone the significant deviations from the Bitcoin white paper that have been imposed on the BCH and BTC blockchains. Ayre predicted that the BTC token, which he refers to as “the Segwit coin that's erroneously still called ‘bitcoin,’” would "go to zero value as it has no utility, it does not do anything and [its supporters] are intentionally anti-scaling.”

=== Real estate development ===
In 2018, Ayre revealed plans to build a $100 million five-star resort on Antigua's Valley Church beach. He claimed that the project would be entirely funded by profits he made from trading Bitcoin, of which he was an early investor.

In November 2019, Ayre opened Canada Place, a $40 million, five-story office complex in St. John's, Antigua that will host up to 600 workers by 2020. Antigua and Barbuda Prime Minister Gaston Browne called Canada Place, which features a solar panel array, "easily the most impressive building on the island, hands down."

In the Antigua and Barbuda government's 2023 budget statement, Browne said Ayre had begun construction of a $40 million conference retreat center on Antigua's southern side. On October 16, 2024, Ayre helped break ground on the US$400 million Nikki Beach Resort and Spa Antigua, a partnership between the Ayre Group and Nikki Beach Hospitality Group. Browne, who participated in the groundbreaking ceremony, called the project “an anchor for our tourism product” that would help “transform Antigua and Barbuda into an economic powerhouse.” Scheduled to open in Jolly Harbour in 2028, the project is expected to provide 300 direct jobs and up to 1,000 indirect jobs.

== Philanthropy ==
Ayre and Bodog have supported charitable causes including the Los Angeles Lakers Youth Foundation and actress Shannon Elizabeth’s Animal Avengers organization. In 2005, Ayre formalized his charitable efforts under the banner of the Calvin Ayre Foundation, which focused on areas including animal welfare, the environment and education for the disadvantaged. The foundation has supported needy families, elementary schools and physical rehabilitation centers in Costa Rica, worked with groups to combat bear bile farming in Asia, and provided funding to enable individuals to pursue higher education. In 2010, the foundation matched funds raised by the online gambling industry for relief efforts tied to the devastating earthquake in Haiti.

In 2006, Ayre produced Bodog Salutes The Troops, a weekend of entertainment for US military personnel in Hawaii, footage of which appeared in a one-hour special on Spike TV.

Following the extensive damage Typhoon Haiyan inflicted on the Philippines in November 2013, Ayre donated $200,000 to local relief efforts. The Calvin Ayre Foundation also pledged to match gaming industry members' individual donations to typhoon relief up to $1 million.

In 2016, Ayre’s foundation was operating in Antigua, where Ayre is based, and the Philippines, providing relief and rehabilitation assistance to a school and communities devastated by typhoons in Northern Samar located in central Philippines, and donating $200,000 to a fund dedicated to ensuring deserving Antiguan students get access to premier education. In 2017, Ayre was presented with a special award for his philanthropic efforts by the Halo Foundation.

In July 2018, during the "Wings of Charity" ceremony held in London by the Halo Foundation, Antigua and Barbuda's Governor General Sir Rodney Williams presented Ayre with the foundation's special award for his philanthropic efforts in support of the vulnerable and underprivileged in Antigua and Barbuda.

On November 14, 2019, Antigua and Barbuda Governor General His Excellency Sir Rodney Williams presented Ayre with the Faithful and Meritorious Service Cross award in recognition of Ayre's philanthropic efforts and contributions to the country's national development.

Calvin Ayre is the founder of the Ayre Think Tank, a forum dedicated to exploring how technology can empower human progress. In November 2026, the think tank published The Ayre Index: The 2026 Commonwealth Youth AI Readiness Index, which was launched at the Commonwealth Heads of Government Meeting in Antigua and Barbuda. The index assesses the conditions that allow people aged 15 to 29 to benefit from artificial intelligence across the Commonwealth’s 56 member states, a population of about 732 million. Singapore ranked first, followed by Malta, Australia, the United Kingdom and Canada.

== Criminal charges ==
In February 2012, Ayre and three other individuals were indicted by the US Attorney for Maryland on charges of illegal gambling related to conduct that occurred before the 2006 passage of the Unlawful Internet Gambling Enforcement Act (UIGEA). Ayre released a statement saying he viewed the indictment as "abuse of the US criminal justice system for the commercial gain of large US corporations." Ayre also noted that the US Attorney had seized Bodog.com.

In July 2017, US federal prosecutors dropped the remaining charges against Ayre and Bodog after Ayre pled guilty to a single misdemeanor charge. The Bodog.com domain has since been returned to its owners after it had been seized by US federal prosecutors as part of the criminal case. Judge Catherine Blake sentenced Ayre to one year of unsupervised probation and a $500,000 fine.

In September 2017, think tank Democracy Institute published Patrick Basham's case study slamming US trade hypocrisy over online gambling dispute with Antigua-Barbuda. The report calls the US government's prosecution of Ayre highly irregular, ill-advised, and unsuccessful. The study states that Ayre's conviction ran afoul of the WTO's ruling as to America's General Agreement on Trade in Services obligations.

Critically, it found that the Illegal Gambling Business Act, which made it illegal for anyone to conduct a gambling business, was explicitly in conflict with America’s commitment under subsection 10D. Hence, the Appellate Body Report concluded that America was in violation of its obligations under its GATS Schedule by maintaining and enforcing these laws.

The review claims that law enforcement officials tried to intimidate Ayre years before the indictments against him were filed, and that prosecutors "…covertly reached out to Ayre through respective third parties … including Ayre’s known business associates and industry contacts, to ‘encourage’ Ayre to make a US$350 million payment to the US Treasury."

The government of Antigua and Barbuda welcomed Ayre’s vindication as part of the failure of the US to comply with World Trade Organization ruling on Internet Gaming. The twin islands government said in a statement, "In light of the WTO ruling in Antigua and Barbuda’s favour, prosecutions by the United States of licensed gaming entities and their principals in Antigua and Barbuda, such as Calvin Ayre, are completely contrary to binding international agreements. In this context, Calvin Ayre and all other Antigua and Barbuda licensed gaming operators, who were indicted in the United States on Internet Gaming charges, are victims not culprits."

== See also ==
- List of Internet entrepreneurs
- List of University of Waterloo people
