= Eric Trump =

American businessman (born 1984)

- Trump in 2026
- Born: Eric Frederick Trump; January 6, 1984 (age 42); New York City, U.S.
- Education: Georgetown University (BS)
- Occupations: Businessman; philanthropist; television presenter; political activist
- Years active: 2004–present
- Known for: Executive at the Trump Organization; Former boardroom judge on The Apprentice
- Political party: Republican (since 2016)
- Other political affiliations: Independent (2002–2016)
- Spouse: Lara Yunaska (m. 2014)
- Children: 2
- Parents: Donald Trump; Ivana Zelníčková
- Family: Trump family
- Website: erictrump.com

Eric Frederick Trump (born January 6, 1984) is an American businessman, political activist, and former reality television presenter. He is the third child and second son of U.S. president Donald Trump and his first wife, Ivana.

Trump is a trustee and executive vice president of his father's business, the Trump Organization, running it alongside his older brother Donald Jr. He was a boardroom judge on his father's television series The Apprentice.

During their father's first presidency, the brothers invested in foreign countries and collected payments in their American properties from foreign governments, despite having pledged not to do so.

== Early life ==
Eric Frederick Trump was born on January 6, 1984, in New York City, the third child and second son of Donald Trump and his first wife Ivana Zelníčková. He attended Trinity School. His parents divorced in 1990, when he was six years old. As a boy, Trump spent his summers in the Czech countryside near Zlín with his maternal grandparents. His grandfather, Miloš Zelníček, who died in 1990, was an engineer; his grandmother, Maria, worked in a shoe factory. His grandfather taught Trump to hunt and fish.

In 2002, Trump graduated from the Hill School, a preparatory boarding high school. In 2006, he graduated with honors from Georgetown University in Washington, D.C., with a bachelor's degree in finance and management and a minor in psychology.

Trump started accompanying his father to job sites and negotiations from a young age. He has said he mowed lawns, laid tiles, and did other work on his father's properties in his youth. Trump briefly considered other careers but decided to join the family business while a high school student.

== Career ==
=== The Trump Organization ===
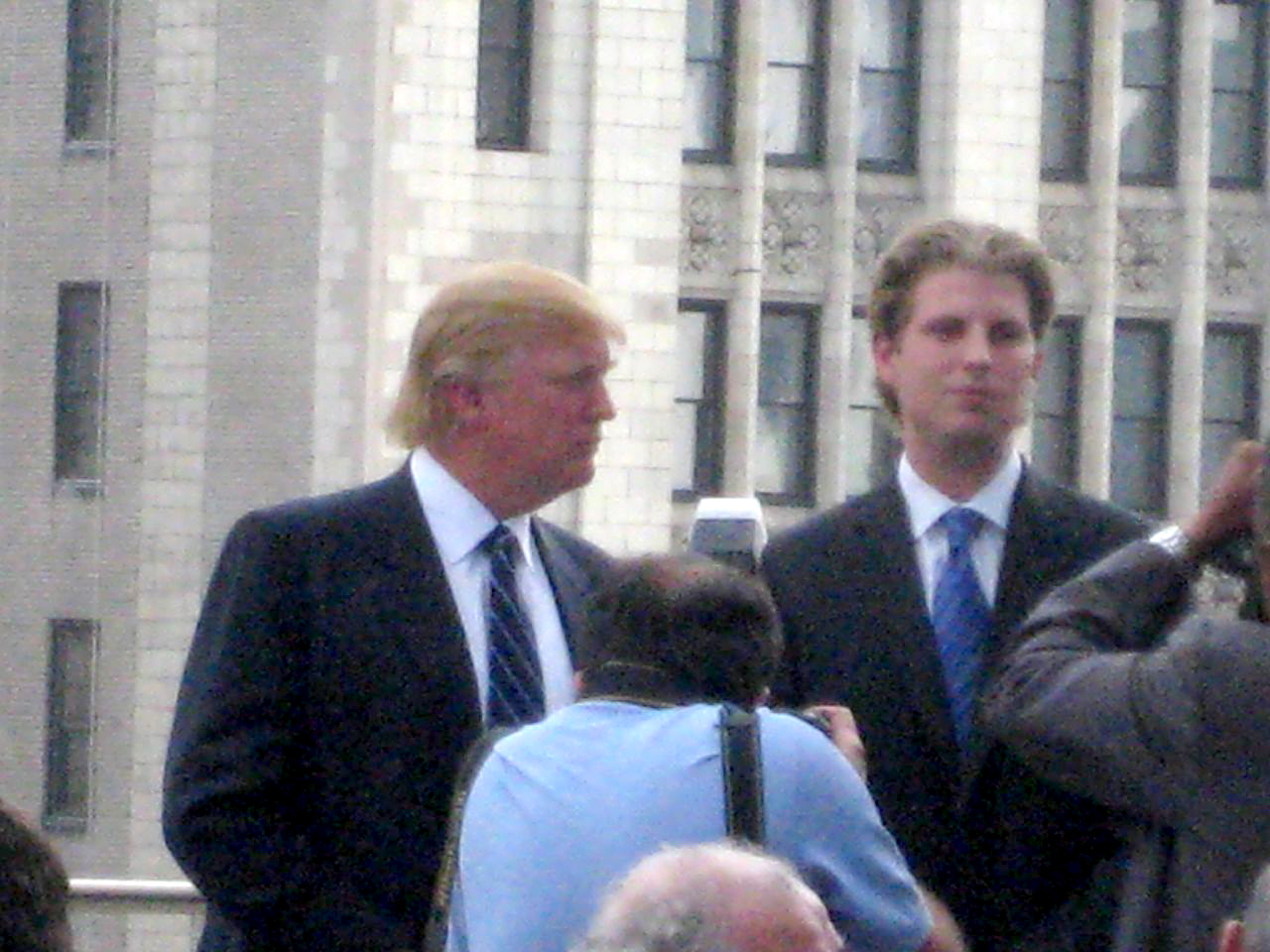
Trump with his father Donald in 2008

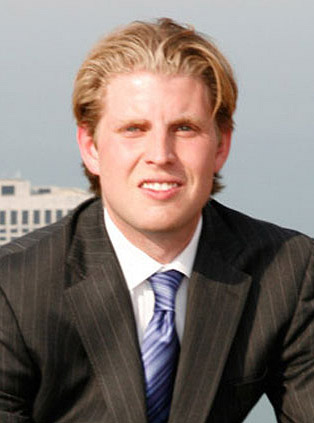
Trump, c. 2009

Trump is the Trump Organization's executive vice president of development and acquisitions. He worked with his sister, Ivanka, to redesign and renovate Trump National Doral and its Blue Monster course in Miami, Florida.

In 2013, Trump received Wine Enthusiast Magazine's "Rising Star of the Year" Award.

Amid the Trump–Ukraine scandal—where President Trump asked the Ukrainian president to investigate Joe Biden and his son, Hunter—Eric Trump strongly criticized Hunter, accusing him of nepotism. Eric claimed that, unlike Hunter, "When my father became president, our family stopped doing international business deals". But when Donald Trump became president, rather than place his assets in a blind trust, he made Eric a top executive in the family business, which continued to operate and promote business transactions across the world. PolitiFact and the Washington Post fact-checkers rated Eric Trump's assertion that the Trump family "got out of all international business" false. PolitiFact noted that not only had the Trump family engaged in international business dealings since Trump became president, but that some of the president's children, including Eric, had openly celebrated their international business activities during that time.

In 2017, it was reported that Eric Trump had said in 2014 that "we don't rely on American banks. We have all the funding we need out of Russia", and that "we've got some guys that really, really love golf, and they're really invested in our programmes. We just go there all the time." In 2008, Trump said that "in terms of high-end product influx into the US, Russians make up a pretty disproportionate cross-section of a lot of our assets", and that "we see a lot of money pouring in from Russia".

In October 2019, Eric Trump complained of the Bidens, "Why is it that every family goes into politics and enriches themselves?". Shortly before he made that statement, President Trump had decided that the G-7 summit would be held at the Trump Doral resort, which is owned by the Trump Organization. President Trump reversed his decision amid bipartisan condemnation.

A ruling which was handed down on February 16, 2024, barred Eric Trump from being an officer or director of any New York corporation or other legal entity in New York, including the Trump Organization, for two years.

=== Television ===
Trump was a boardroom judge on his father's reality television series The Apprentice (2010–2015). He appeared in 23 episodes, 21 times as a boardroom judge and twice as an audience member.

=== Cryptocurrency ===
By December 2025, Trump held substantial shares in two cryptocurrency companies, American Bitcoin and World Liberty Financial.

=== Insider betting allegation ===
On June 14, 2026, Daniel Cormier posted a screenshot of his interaction with Trump on X, which appeared to show Trump asking for insider information about the UFC Freedom 250 fight. Eric Trump later responded: "We are aware of the fake, AI generated screenshots being circulated online. I have never spoken to Daniel. He has since deleted his post, which confirms it was clearly fabricated."

== The Eric Trump Foundation ==
In 2007, Trump established the Eric Trump Foundation, a public charity to raise money for St. Jude Children's Research Hospital in Tennessee. On November 30, 2012, the foundation committed to raising $20 million over ten years for the naming rights to the new Eric Trump Foundation Surgery & ICU Center in the Kay Research and Care Center, a $198 million tower that opened on February 19, 2015, on the St. Jude campus.

St. Jude stated in 2013 that the 7th Annual Eric Trump Foundation Golf Invitational on September 9, 2013, at the Trump National Golf Club in Briarcliff, New York, had "... raised $1.5 million for the kids of St. Jude", for a total of $6 million since 2006. On December 30, 2016, Richard C. Shadyac Jr., the president of the fundraising organization of St. Jude Children's Research Hospital, wrote the Eric Trump Foundation a letter stating that the foundation and "... related efforts, such as an Eric Trump Foundation-affiliated team that participates in the New York City Marathon", had raised $16.3 million for the hospital since the charity's inception ten years earlier.

On December 21, 2016, Trump announced that he would stop active fundraising for the Eric Trump Foundation as of December 31. The move came to avoid the appearance that donors were using him to gain access to his father after he won the presidential election.

The foundation's 2016 tax return, filed under its alternative name the Curetivity Foundation, shows that the contributions it received increased from $1.8 million in 2015 to $3.2 million in 2016. The foundation gave $2,910,000 in donations to St. Jude and several smaller donations to other charities while paying a total of $145,000 to various for-profit properties the Trump family owned.

In 2016, the fundraising president of St. Jude Children's Research Hospital stated that the Eric Trump Foundation had raised and donated $16.3 million to the hospital since the charity's foundation.

=== Funds usage ===
In June 2017, Forbes reported that the Eric Trump Foundation shifted money intended to go to cancer patients to the Trumps' businesses. Eric Trump had asserted that his foundation got to use Trump Organization assets for free ("We get to use our assets 100% free of charge"), but that appears not to be true. According to Forbes, more than $1.2 million of the donations went to the Trump Organization for the use of Trump's Westchester golf course, and "Golf charity experts say the listed expenses defy any reasonable cost justification for a one-day golf tournament". According to a former foundation director, "We did have to cover the expenses. ...The charity had grown so much that the Trump Organization couldn't absorb all of those costs anymore." Forbes acknowledged that the charity has done a great deal of good, including an intensive-care unit that opened in 2015 at St. Jude and funding cancer research. According to Trump, the foundation's expense ratio is 12.6%, and "at no time did the Trump Organization profit in any way from the foundation or any of its activities".

Forbes also reported that more than $500,000 of the money donated for cancer patients "was re-donated to other charities, many of which were connected to Trump family members or interests, including at least four groups that subsequently paid to hold golf tournaments at Trump courses". According to Forbes, "All of this seems to defy federal tax rules and state laws that ban self-dealing and misleading donors. It also raises larger questions about the Trump family dynamics and whether Eric and his brother, Don Jr., can be truly independent of their father." The foundation says that relevant donors were informed that donations would be redirected.

The Eric Trump Foundation had advertised that its golf charity events raised money exclusively for St. Jude Children's Research Hospital, with 95–100% of the money raised going toward the charity. Public tax records show that the foundation applied significant amounts of the funds raised to pay costs of the events to the Trump Organization for use of its facilities. Additionally, the foundation donated to charitable causes other than St. Jude and made grants to several other charities, including at least three animal welfare organizations and the American Society for Enology and Viticulture, a California wine industry organization.

Trump said in July 2016 that Donald Trump had made "hundreds of thousands of dollars in personal donations" to the Eric Trump Foundation in the past, but there is no evidence of that. When The Washington Post requested evidence, Trump appeared to backtrack and refused to give details.

In June 2017, the New York State Attorney General's Office confirmed that it had begun an inquiry into the Eric Trump Foundation, based on issues the Forbes investigation raised. The investigation was reported as ongoing in December 2018.

== Involvement in Presidential campaigns ==
=== 2016 presidential campaign ===
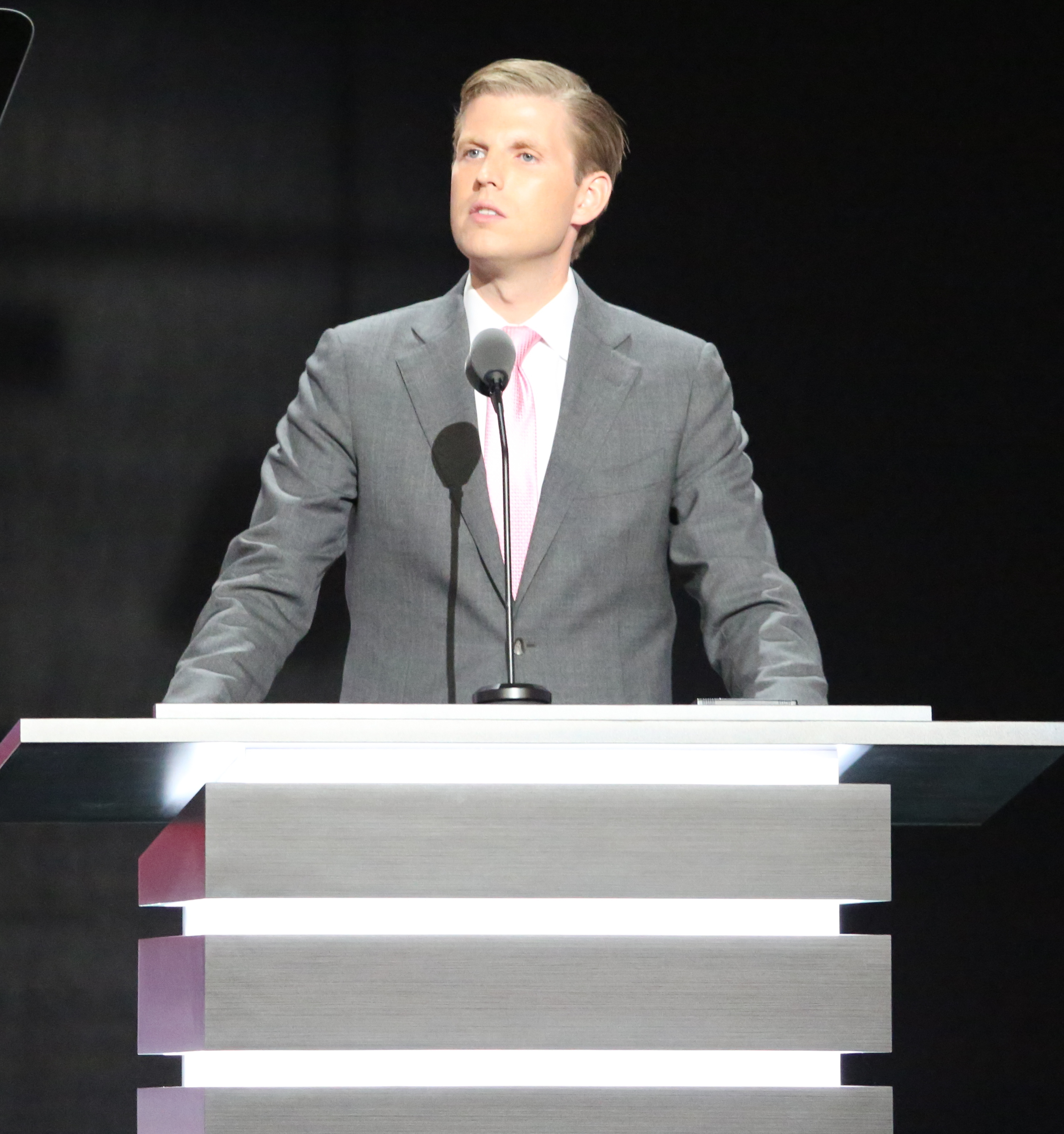
Trump speaking at the 2016 RNC

Donald Trump's 2016 presidential campaign was formally launched on June 16, 2015, at Trump Tower in New York City. Eric was a key advisor, fundraiser, and campaign surrogate during the campaign. He and his wife made campaign appearances in numerous states on his father's behalf.

On August 2, 2016, in a television appearance on CBS This Morning, Trump was asked to comment on his father's controversial statement to USA Today the previous day in which he said that if his daughter were ever subjected to sexual harassment in the workplace, he hoped she would find another company to work for or switch careers. Trump said, "Ivanka is a strong, powerful woman; she wouldn't allow herself to be objected [recte subjected] to it".

=== Michael Cohen reimbursement payments ===
On May 28, 2024, an email was shown during defense closing arguments in Donald Trump's New York criminal trial which revealed that longtime Trump Organization comptroller Jeffrey McConnery, who was previously acknowledged to have organized Trump Sr.'s reimbursement payments to Michael Cohen following the hush money payments Cohen made to Stormy Daniels, sought approval from both Eric Trump and Donald Trump Jr. It has been acknowledged that Eric Trump had signed some of the reimbursement checks to Cohen as well.

=== Conspiracy theories and attempts to overturn the 2020 presidential election ===
Trump has promoted several conspiracy theories.

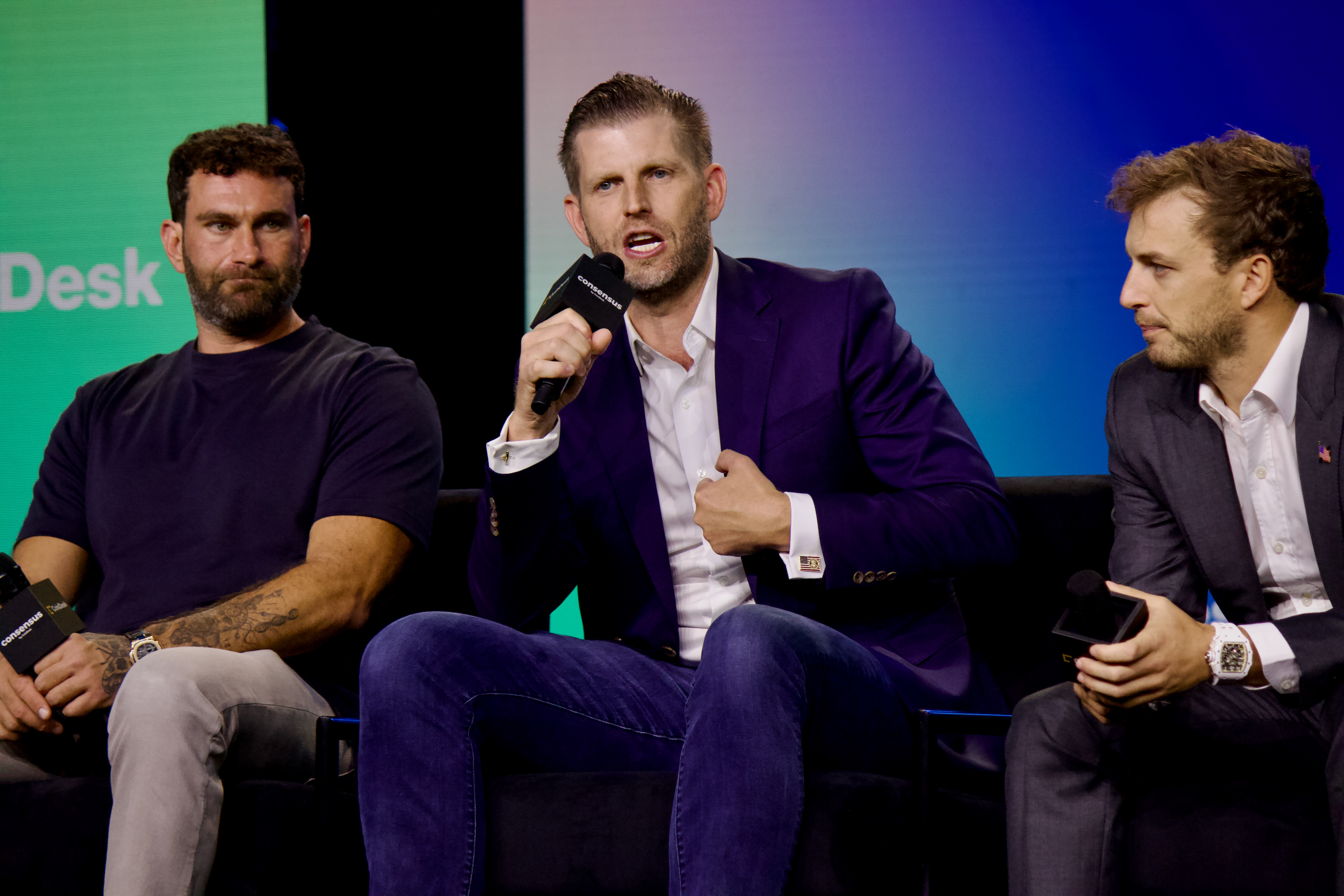
Trump at Consensus 2025

In May 2020, Trump said on Fox News that stay-at-home orders to combat the spread of COVID-19 were a strategy by the Democrats and the Joe Biden campaign intended to prevent his father's reelection by depriving him of the ability to conduct large campaign rallies. Trump said that after election day, "Coronavirus will magically all of a sudden go away and disappear and everybody will be able to reopen".

In September 2020, Trump spread a false video that appeared to show Biden "being caught red-handed using a teleprompter" when he was not.

Following his father's electoral defeat, Eric Trump engaged in attempts to overturn the 2020 United States presidential election, falsely calling the election result a "fraud" and threatening Republican lawmakers to overturn the result.

While ballots were being counted in the 2020 election, Trump made baseless claims intended to cast doubt on Pennsylvania's ballot-counting process. He shared a fake video that purported to show Trump ballots being burned.

On the day of the January 6 storming of the United States Capitol, Trump spoke at the "Save America" rally alongside his wife Lara and Donald Trump Jr., among others. Trump was later among those who advanced the conspiracy theory that people associated with antifa were responsible for the attack.

=== 2028 presidential election ===
In 2025, Eric Trump mentioned that he might run for president in 2028 when his father is term limited.

== Personal life ==
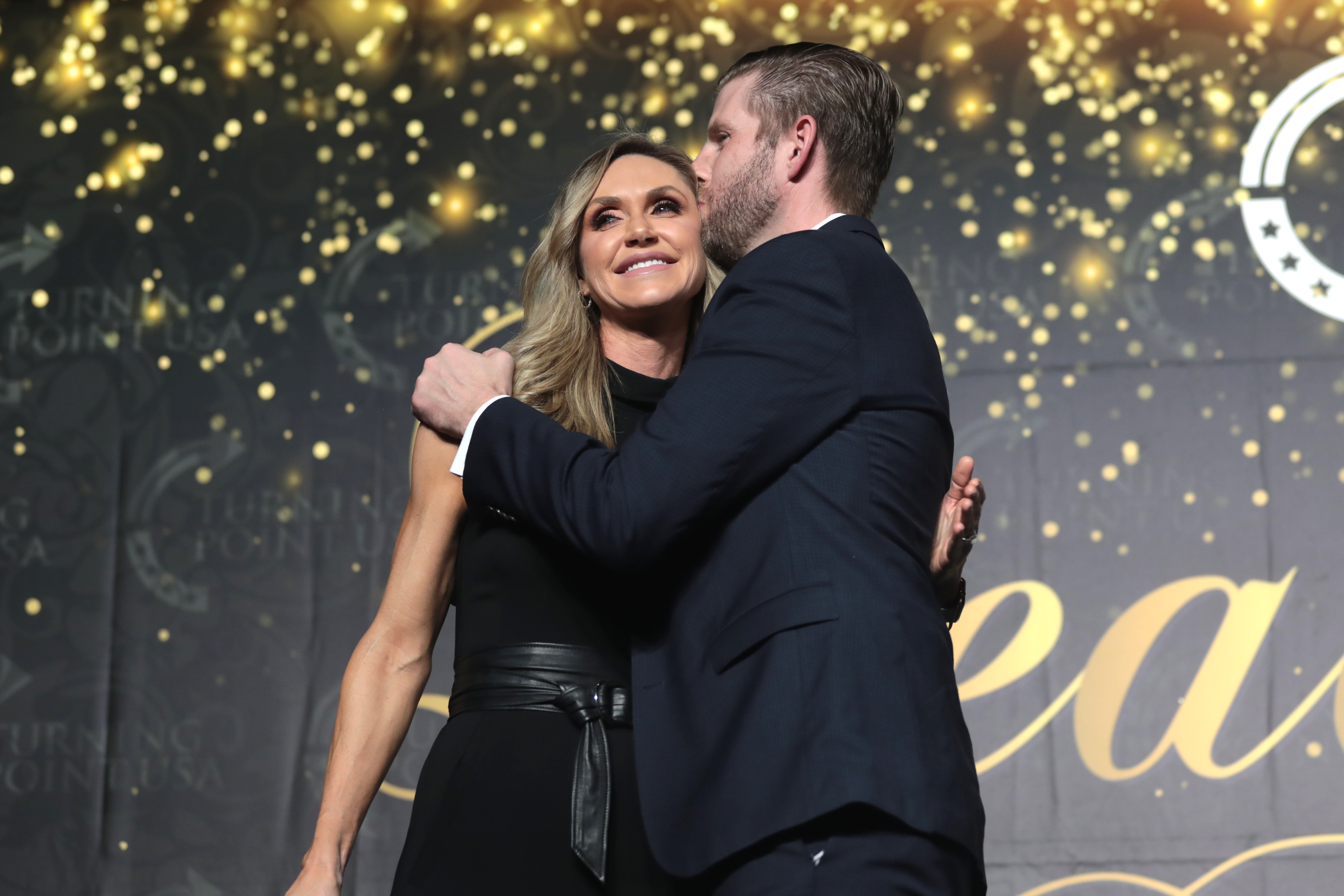
Eric and Lara in 2020

On July 4, 2013, Trump became engaged to his longtime girlfriend Lara Lea Yunaska, an associate producer on the syndicated television news program Inside Edition. They married on November 8, 2014 at the Mar-a-Lago Club in Palm Beach, Florida. They have two children; their son Eric Luke Trump was born in September 2017, and their daughter Carolina Dorothy Trump was born in August 2019. They are respectively the ninth and tenth grandchildren of Donald Trump.

In April 2021, Trump and his wife acquired a $3.2 million home in Jupiter, Florida. In March 2022, Trump joined other members of his family in switching his official residency from New York to Florida.

Trump is an "avid outdoorsman" and big-game hunter. He also enjoys skiing.
