= Mazzuma =

Blockchain Payments in Ghana

- Company type: Private
- Industry: FinTech
- Founded: 2015
- Founder: Nii Osae Osae Dade & Kofi Genfi
- Headquarters: Accra, Ghana
- Website: mazzuma.com

Mazzuma is a mobile payments ecosystem that uses Artificial Intelligence and Blockchain to facilitate transactions. Its headquarters is located in Accra, Ghana.

== History ==
Mazzuma was founded in 2015 by Kofi Genfi and Nii Osae Dade who were both named in Forbes Africa 30 under 30 Technology category in 2018. Mazzuma currently has over 300,000 customers that use its service to make payments and receive remittances.

Its partner companies include MTN Ghana, Vodafone, United Nations Development Programme, AirtelTigo, RemitONE, National Entrepreneurship and Innovation Plan and Crypto Valley.

Mazzuma has processed transactions and with its Application Programming Interface (API), integrated E-commerce stores and developers into its system.
