= Nii Osae Osae Dade =

Ghanaian businessman (born 1993)

- Born: 1993 (age 32–33); Ghana
- Education: University of Ghana
- Occupations: Entrepreneur, business executive
- Years active: 2013–present
- Known for: Mazzuma

Nii Osae Osae Dade (born December 29, 1993) is a Ghanaian entrepreneur and a computer scientist. He is the co-founder and director of both Mazzuma and Utopia Technologies: two companies in the digital commerce space for emerging markets. He is the Director of Software engineering for Mazzuma.

== Early life and education ==
Nii Osae was born in Ghana and had his secondary education at the Presbyterian Boys Senior High School, Legon. He further studied BSc Computer Science at the University of Ghana

== Career ==
Nii Osae is also the board chairman of the Artificial Intelligence Association Ghana and a member of the Astronomical Society of Ghana and he was a speaker at the Tech in Ghana Conference, NVIDIA GTC 21, Global Webinar Series on AI in Finance.

In 2013, Nii Osae co-founded CYST, a software innovation company specializing in Artificial Intelligence, Blockchain, and mobile payment systems to improve financial inclusion in emerging markets through its flagship product called Mazzuma and processes transactional volumes.

== Recognition ==
Nii Osae was recognized in the Forbes Africa 30 Under 30 Technology category. He was part of the IBM/Airtel Mini Mobile Innovations Competition to develop smart innovations using telecommunications.
