= Micree Zhan =

Chinese electronics engineer and businessman

- Born: Zhan Ketuan; 27 March 1979 (age 47); Minhou County, Fujian, China
- Education: Shandong University; Institute of Microelectronics, Chinese Academy of Sciences
- Occupation: Businessman
- Known for: Co-founder and CEO, Bitmain

Micree Zhan or Zhan Ketuan (Chinese: 詹克团; born 29 January 1979) is a Chinese electronics engineer and businessman. He is the co-founder and CEO (with Wu Jihan) of Bitmain, the world's largest computer chip company for cryptocurrency mining. In 2018, the Hurun Report named him the richest cryptocurrency billionaire in the world. In 2019, Bloomberg ranked Zhan as the world's 9th richest self-made billionaire aged 40 or younger, with a net worth of US$5.2 billion.

== Early life and education ==
Zhan Ketuan was born on 29 January 1979 in Minhou County, Fujian, China.

After graduating from Minhou No. 1 High School, he entered Shandong University, where he earned a bachelor's degree in electronics engineering in 2001. He then earned his master's degree in microelectronics engineering from the Institute of Microelectronics, Chinese Academy of Sciences in 2004.

== Career ==
After earning his master's degree, Zhan worked as an engineer at the Information Technology Research Institute at Tsinghua University. He later started his own business making set-top boxes for television.

In 2013, Zhan met up with Wu Jihan, an enthusiast for cryptocurrency. After hours of discussion and research, Zhan agreed to start Bitmain with Wu. The company quickly grew into the world's largest computer chip company for bitcoin mining, reporting US$2.5 billion in revenue in 2017. As of 2018, Zhan owns 36% of Bitmain, and Wu 20%.

In Hurun Report's inaugural Blockchain Rich List 2018, Zhan was named the richest cryptocurrency entrepreneur in the world, with an estimated net worth of 29.5 billion yuan (US$4.3 billion), while Wu was ranked second. In February 2019, Bloomberg ranked Zhan as the world's 9th richest self-made billionaire aged 40 or younger, with a net worth of US$5.2 billion. As of June 2019, he is listed as the world's 311th richest person in the Bloomberg Billionaires Index, with $5.42 billion.

== Personal life ==
As of 2019, Zhan is single and has no children. He lives in Beijing.
