= Dave Kleiman =

American computer investigator (1967–2013)

- Born: January 22, 1967; U.S.
- Died: April 26, 2013 (aged 46); Palm Beach Gardens, Florida
- Occupation: Forensic computer expert
- Website: https://www.davekleiman.com/

Dave Kleiman (22 January 1967 – 26 April 2013) was an American computer forensics expert, an author or co-author of multiple books, and a frequent speaker at security-related events.

Craig Steven Wright claims Kleiman was involved in the invention of bitcoin, and that Wright himself was Satoshi Nakamoto, bitcoin's main inventor. Wright's claims were subject to litigation in London, where it was subsequently declared he is not Satoshi Nakamoto, did not write the bitcoin white paper, nor wrote the bitcoin software.

== Background ==
At the age of 21 in 1988, Kleiman was named United States Army Soldier of the Year. He received the Army Achievement Medal and a commendation signed by the Secretary of the Army. The commendation said in part, "Appearance, knowledge of general military subjects, current events and other subjects covered coupled with your strong dedication to duty, never failed to produce anything but outstanding results."

After distinguished service in the Army, Kleiman returned to his hometown and became a sworn law enforcement officer for the Palm Beach County Sheriff's Office (PBSO). In 1995, a motorcycle accident left him paralyzed, requiring the use of a wheelchair. After his recovery, he continued working at PBSO and attained the rank of detective. He also worked as a System Security Analyst in the Computer Crimes Division and helped configure the Computer Forensics Lab. Kleiman went on to work at a number of high tech companies before becoming a partner in a computer forensics business. Kleiman died in his home in late April 2013, seemingly of natural causes related to complications from a MRSA infection.

== Computer security & cryptography ==
Some of Kleiman's most notable work took place at S-doc (Securit-e-doc,) where his role was Chief Information Security Officer. While there he developed a Windows encryption tool that surpassed NSA, NIST, and Microsoft Common Criteria Guidelines. This technology was used at NASA, U.S. Dept. of Treasury, Office of the Inspector General, and the US Post Office. Cryptography was routinely used at S-doc to develop several products, broadly aimed at the reliable and verifiable transmission of data and messages, centered around the idea of an "unalterable, encrypted audit log system".

Kleiman was also a regular contributor to cryptography and security mailing lists where discussions included technical aspects of cryptosystems and the politics of cryptography. Kleiman was a long-time member of the same Metzdowd Cryptography mailing list where Satoshi Nakamoto first announced Bitcoin on Oct. 31, 2008.

Kleiman held the following certifications: Information Systems Security Management Professional (ISSMP), Information Systems Security Architecture Professional (ISSAP), Certified Information Systems Security Professional (CISSP), Certified Information Forensics Investigator (CIFI), Certified Information Security Manager (CISM), Certified Anti-Terrorism Specialist (CAS), Certified Computer Examiner (CCE), a Microsoft Certified Systems Engineer (MCSE).

For multiple years, Kleiman was awarded Microsoft MVP for Windows – Security.

Dave was named in an email to have cloned hard drives for Jeffrey Epstein in 2009.

== Alleged bitcoin involvement ==
In December 2015, Gizmodo reported that Dave Kleiman may have been involved in the invention of the digital currency bitcoin, based on documents sent to the press concerning Craig Steven Wright's claim to be Satoshi Nakamoto, the inventor of bitcoin. Wright repeated the claim to The Economist in May 2016. Wright's claims were struck down after litigation in London in March 2024, as he was declared to not be Satoshi Nakamoto.

In February 2018, Dave Kleiman's brother Ira, the executor of his estate, initiated a lawsuit in the U.S. District Court for the Southern District of Florida on behalf of the Kleiman estate against Wright over the rights to between 550,000 and 1,100,000 bitcoins, claiming Wright defrauded the estate of bitcoins and intellectual property rights. The estate alleged that Kleiman was one of the early bitcoin pioneers and worked with Craig Steven Wright on bitcoin's establishment.

Following a three-week trial in late 2021, a jury entered a verdict in favor of Kleiman's estate but awarded him only $100 million in damages, far less than the more than $25 billion that Kleiman's estate had sought at trial.

== Publications ==
- Co-author: Microsoft Log Parser Toolkit; Syngress Publishing; ISBN 1-932266-52-6
- Co-author: Security Log Management: Identifying Patterns in the Chaos; Syngress Publishing; ISBN 1-59749-042-3
- Technical editor: Perfect Passwords: Selection, Protection and Authentication; Syngress Publishing; ISBN 1-59749-041-5
- Technical editor: Winternals Defragmentation, Recovery, and Administration Field Guide; Syngress Publishing; ISBN 1-59749-079-2
- CD and DVD Forensics: Technical Editor, ISBN 1-59749-128-4
- How to Cheat at Windows System Administration: Contributing Author, ISBN 1-59749-105-5
- Enemy at the Water Cooler: Real Life Stories of Insider Threats, Technical Reviewer, ISBN 1-59749-129-2
- Rootkits for Dummies: Technical editor, ISBN 978-0-471-91710-6
- Windows Forensic Analysis Including DVD Toolkit: Technical Editor, ISBN 1-59749-156-X
- The Official CHFI Study Guide (Exam 312-49): Main author, ISBN 1-59749-197-7
