= James Mellor (judge) =

British judge

The Honourable Mr Justice Mellor
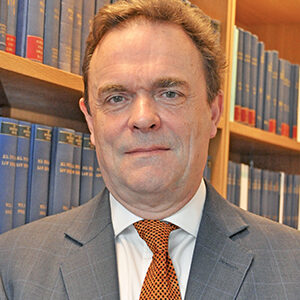
- Mellor in 2022

Justice of the High Court
- Incumbent
- Assumed office 8 February 2021

Personal details
- Born: 16 May 1961 (age 65) Sutton Coldfield
- Education: King's College, Cambridge

Sir Edward James Mellor (born 16 May 1961), styled Mr Justice Mellor, is a British High Court judge.

== Early life and education ==
Mellor was born on 16 May 1961 in Sutton Coldfield. He grew up and studied at a boarding school in Rugby. He then went on to study Engineering and then Production engineering at King's College, Cambridge. He worked as an engineer on various projects and later returned to Cambridge to complete a Law conversion course.

== Legal career ==
Mellor was called to the bar in 1986 and began practice at 8 New Square Chambers in 1987, specialising in intellectual property.

Mellor was appointed King's Counsel in 2006.

In August 2015, the Lord Chancellor appointed Mellor as an 'Appointed Person', allowing him to hear appeals against decisions from the Intellectual Property Office.

On 22 March 2018, Mellor became Head of Chambers at 8 New Square.

Mellor was appointed as a High Court Judge assigned to the Chancery Division on 8 February 2021. He received the customary Knighthood in March 2022.
