= Kofi Genfi =

Ghanaian businessman and entrepreneur

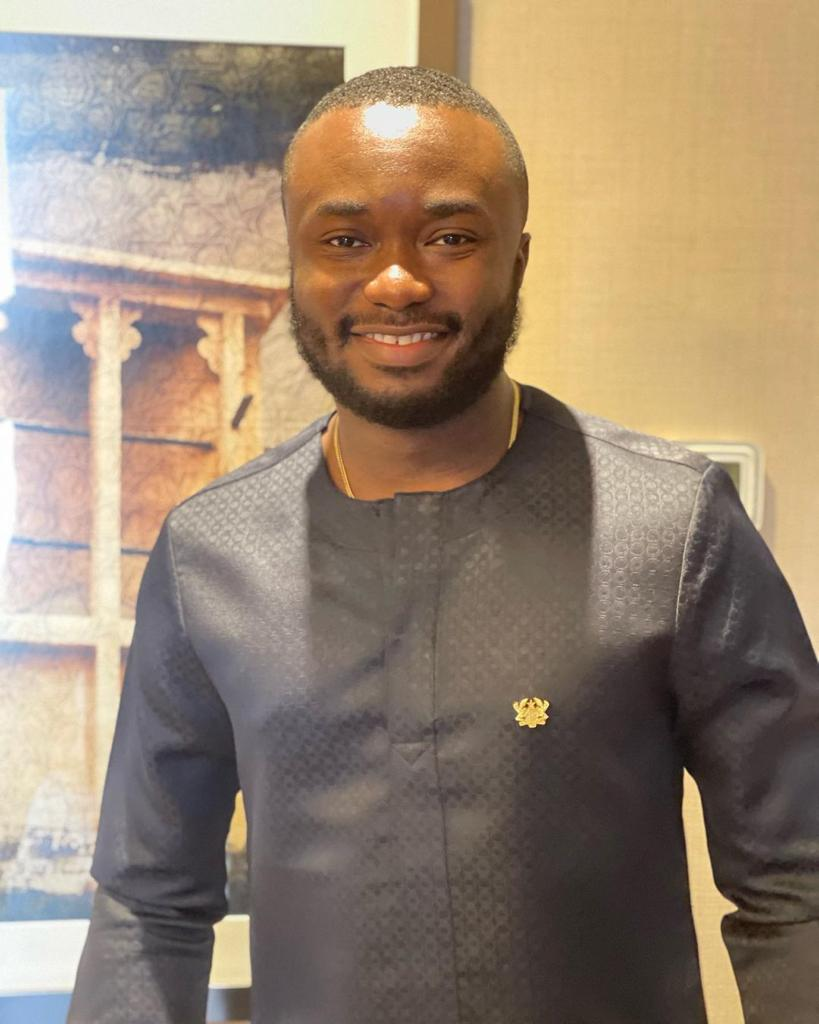
- Born: 1993 (age 32–33); Ghana
- Education: Ashesi University
- Occupations: Entrepreneur, business executive
- Years active: 2013–present
- Known for: Mazzuma

Kofi Genfi (born 1993) is a Ghanaian entrepreneur and business executive. He is the founder and chief executive officer of Vaulta Digital Assets and was the co-founder of CYST, the software company behind the Mazzuma mobile payment platform.

== Early life and education ==
Genfi was born in Ghana and had his secondary education at the Presbyterian Boys Senior High School, Legon. He further studied Business Administration at the Ashesi University.

== Career ==
=== CYST and MAZZUMA ===
In 2013, Kofi Genfi and Nii Osae Osae Dade co-founded CYST, a software innovation company specializing in Artificial Intelligence, Blockchain, and mobile payment systems to improve financial inclusion in emerging markets. In 2015 it launched its maiden product called Mazzuma developed for digital and mobile-money transactions.

Genfi is an alumnus of the Thiel Fellowship Network established by the technology billionaire Peter Thiel and in 2015, he competed at the International Public Speaking Competition in London. He also provided consulting, engineering services, project management, and technical support for the United Nations Development Program (UNDP) in the field of Effective Plastic Waste Management and is a stakeholder of the Global Plastic Action Partnership.

=== Vaulta Digital Assets ===
Genfi is the founder and chief executive officer of Vaulta Digital Assets, a Ghanaian digital-asset company involved in digital-asset infrastructure and asset tokenisation. In March 2026, Vaulta Digital Assets was among the virtual asset service providers admitted by Ghana's Securities and Exchange Commission (SEC) to its Virtual Asset Sandbox. The sandbox was established as a controlled environment for virtual-asset companies to test products and services under regulatory oversight.

In August 2026, the SEC published the full list of participants in the sandbox and identified Vaulta Digital Assets Ltd.'s approved pilot activity as asset tokenisation (securities).

== Recognition ==
- In 2018 Genfi was recognised in the Forbes 30 Under 30 Technology category with his co-founder of Mazzuma Nii Osae Osae Dade.
- In 2019, Genfi received the Discovery of the Year award at the EMY Africa Awards.
