= Jihan Wu =

Chinese-Singaporean entrepreneur (born 1986)

- Born: 1986 (age 39–40); Chongqing, China
- Citizenship: Singapore
- Education: Peking University
- Occupation: CEO of Bitdeer
- Known for: Co-founder of Bitmain

Jihan Wu (Chinese: 吳忌寒; born 1986) is a Chinese-born Singaporean billionaire cryptocurrency entrepreneur. Together with Micree Zhan, he co-founded Bitmain in 2013, which has become the world's largest computer chip company for bitcoin mining, with US$2.5 billion in revenue in 2017. He is a leading supporter of Bitcoin Cash, a hard fork of bitcoin created in 2017 with increased transaction capacity. He topped Forbes' 2020 World's Billionaires List as one of the five youngest billionaires in Asia. He is the owner of Le Freeport.

== Early life and career ==
Wu was born in 1986 in Chongqing, China. After graduating from Chongqing Nankai Secondary School, he entered Peking University, earning dual degrees in economics and psychology in 2009.

After graduating from university, Wu worked as a financial analyst for a private equity firm. In May 2011, he discovered Bitcoin and raised 100,000 yuan (US$15,373 as of 2011) from family and friends to purchase 900 bitcoins. He and fellow Bitcoin enthusiast Chang Jia (长铗) founded Babite (巴比特), China's first Bitcoin community site. In late 2011, he was the first to translate Satoshi Nakamoto's bitcoin white paper into Chinese.

In 2012, with cofounder Friedcat (烤猫) Wu invested in the bitcoin mining company ASICMINER, one of the first companies to produce application-specific integrated circuits (ASIC) used to mine Bitcoin worldwide. Although initially successful with more than a thousand times of investment return given to its investors, Friedcat later ran into technical difficulties and exited the business. Wu also lost his investment purchasing hardware from another mining hardware company, Canaan Creative.

== Bitmain, Bitdeer and Matrixport ==
Having realized the importance of technical expertise, in 2013 Wu reached out to the microelectronics engineer Micree Zhan, whom he had met a few years before, and convinced Zhan to co-found Bitmain with him. In November 2013, Zhan developed Antminer S1, the company's first mining rig. Sales soon took off, but hit a downturn in 2014 when fraud was discovered at the Japanese bitcoin exchange Mt. Gox, leading to its collapse. In 2015, Bitmain developed Antminer S5, which became the best-selling mining equipment as bitcoin prices recovered. Bitmain grew into the world's largest computer chip company for bitcoin mining, reporting US$2.5 billion in revenue in 2017. In 2018, Wu owned 20% of Bitmain shares, and Zhan 36%.

Wu has been a vocal proponent for increasing bitcoin's transaction capacity, which is limited to only seven per second due to the 1-megabyte size limit of bitcoin blocks, but the proposal was opposed by traditionalists. After two years of debate between the two camps, a Shenzhen-based mining company called ViaBTC, which Bitmain had invested in, orchestrated a hard fork of bitcoin, creating Bitcoin Cash in August 2017. Wu's critics accuse him of being the mastermind behind the fork, calling him "Jihad", a play on his given name, but Wu denied that he or Bitmain had so much influence in the matter.

In 2019, Wu stepped down as co-CEO of Bitmain and founded Matrixport, a financial services company for cryptocurrencies. To comply with China's ban on cryptocurrency trading, the company is based in Singapore.

In 2021, Wu officially left Bitmain saying the disagreement between himself and Micree Zhan has finally been settled amicably. As a result, the cryptocurrency mining pool BTC.com and mining cloud service Bitdeer have spun off from Bitmain and Wu will be the chairman. Later, BTC.com was sold to a public company BTCM.

In 2022, through Bitdeer, Wu purchased Le Freeport, a Singaporean maximum-security vault, from Yves Bouvier for S$40 million (US$28.4 million).

== Wealth ==
In Hurun Report's inaugural Blockchain Rich List 2018, Wu was named the second richest cryptocurrency entrepreneur in China, with an estimated net worth of 16.5 billion yuan (US$2.39 billion), behind only Micree Zhan. Hurun also ranked him as the 204th richest person in China. In the same year, he was ranked No. 3 in Fortune's The Ledger 40 under 40, for transforming business at the leading edge of finance and technology.

== Personal life ==
Wu is a citizen of Singapore, and lived in Singapore as of 2024.
