= Sieger =

Sieger is a German surname.

People with the surname include:

- Hermann E. Sieger (1902–1954), German philatelist and Nazi Party official
- Dieter Sieger (*1938), German architect, shipbuilder, industrial designer, painter and art collector
- Nadja Sieger (*1967), Swiss comedian
- Steffi Sieger (*1988), German luger

== See also ==
Names sometimes confused:

- Pete Seeger an American folk singer
- Allan Savory a Rhodesian ecologist
