= Dieter Sieger =

German painter

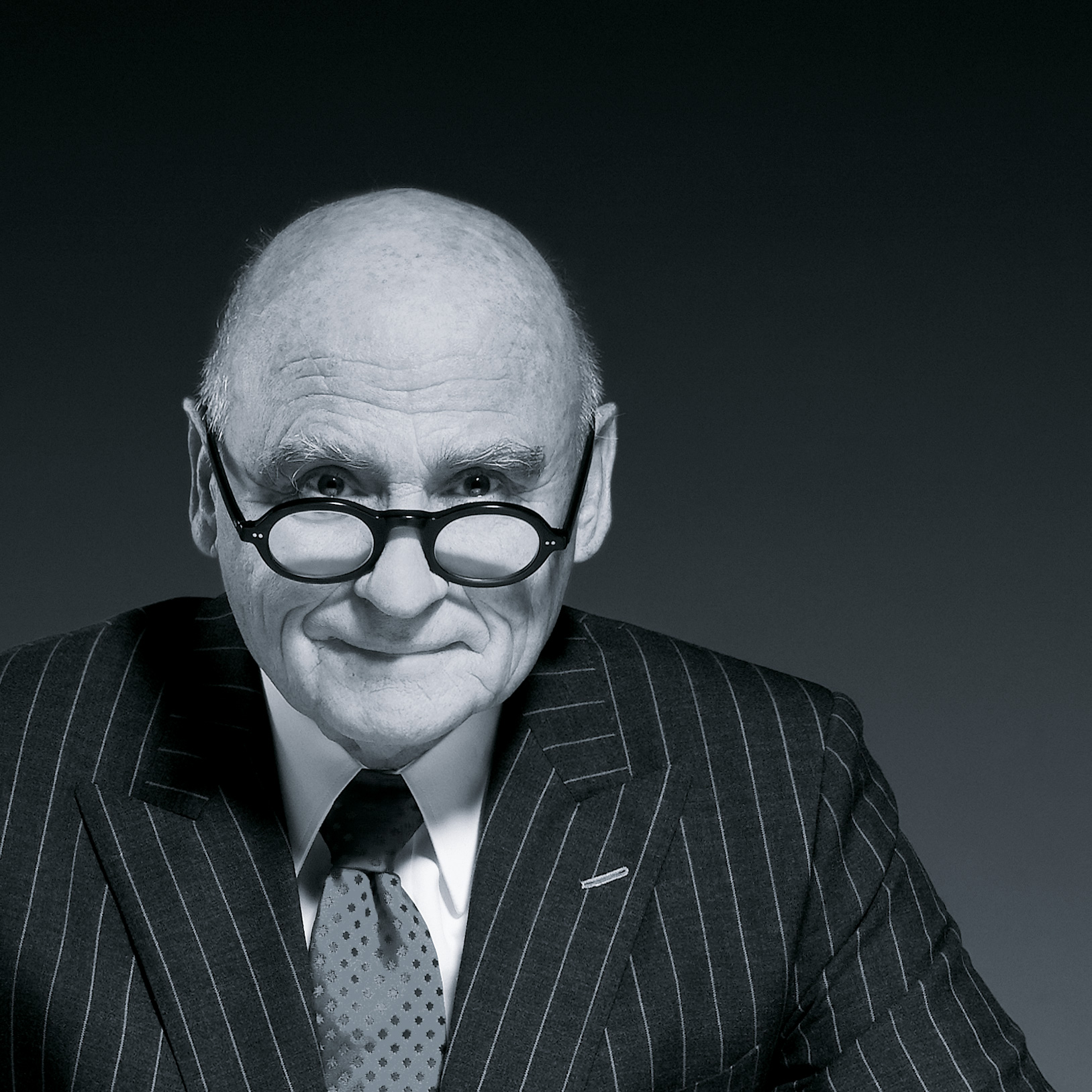
Dieter Sieger

Dieter Sieger (born 3 May 1938) is a German architect, shipbuilder, industrial designer, painter and art collector. He is one of Germany's most prominent and distinctive contemporary designers. In the 1980s and 1990s, Sieger made history by making stylistic and cultural orientation in the bathroom a key point of his design. He developed several groundbreaking bathroom concepts and products, most notably the single-lever mixer "Domani" (1985) and the cross-handle tap "Tara" (1992) (both Dornbracht).

== Life ==
Dieter Sieger was born in Münster, the first of two children born to a family of civil servants. He developed a talent for drawing at an early age, but his family showed little understanding. While still at school, Sieger began attending an evening drawing class for adults at the Werkkunstschule Münster. His encounters with other attendees had a lasting influence and opened up new ways of looking at things. In the years that followed, Sieger produced perspective drawings for the landscape architect Rudolf Beaufays. Through this work, he became acquainted with big houses owned by various industrialists. During regular trips to Venice, Sieger made drawings of the city and of the north Italian landscape. He sold his works through Galerie Frye in Münster.

After finishing school, Sieger first passed an architectural training period of one year, and between 1957 and 1960, he completed a bricklayer apprenticeship in Münster. During this time, he designed and oversaw the construction of his first building: a pilgrimage chapel in Wesuwe. In 1960, Sieger passed his apprenticeship leave exam and at the same time his specialised A-levels. He then spent two semesters at the engineering college in Münster before switching to Dortmund College of Applied Arts. Here he completed a degree in architecture in 1964. While still a student, he designed his own house in Albachten, Münster, and built parts of it with his own two hands. In 1964, he married the Netherlander Fransje Blom and started an architecture firm in Münster. Right from the beginning, Fransje worked with him in his office and closely assisted him with all projects and areas of his work.

Due to his passion for sailing, between 1976 and 1982 the focus of Sieger's work shifted to interior design for sailing and motor yachts. He designed in particular interiors for more than 30 vessels for various shipyards, including Anne Wever in ’s-Hertogenbosch and Heesen in Oss (Netherlands).

In the early 1980s, Sieger branched out into bathroom design and developed designs for companies including Alape, Dornbracht, Duravit and Hoesch. Some of these designs came out on top in competitions against designers such as Luigi Colani and Matteo Thun. Sieger was the first designer to conceive of bathrooms as a unified whole, and he developed “complete bathrooms” into a discrete market segment. He also achieved success as an industrial designer and exhibition stand planner, worked as a consultant for various companies and served on several committees.

In the mid-1980s, Sieger began to build up a network in Venice. Through the Venetian gallery owner Piero Mainardis de Campo, he made the acquaintance of Alessandro Mendini, Fabrizio Plessi, Mimmo Paladino, Arnoldo Pomodoro, Miguel Berrocal, Alessio Sarri, Ettore Sottsass and others. Today, Sieger is one of the world's leading Sottsass collectors.

In 1988, Sieger moved his company to Schloss von Ketteler (a baroque manor house belonging to the Harkotten Castle complex between Münster and Osnabrück) and comprehensively refurbished it. The garden was laid out by Belgian landscape architect Jacques Wirtz. Sieger installed outdoor sculptures by Marte Röling, Andrea Branzi (drinking fountain), Miguel Berrocal, Alessandro Mendini, Ettore Sottsass (pavilion) and Fabrizio Plessi (sound installation).

From 1997 to 2000, Sieger was president of the German Designer Club (DDC). In 2001, he was visiting professor at Zurich Academy of Design.

In 2003, Sieger handed over the active management of his company to his sons, Christian and Michael. Christian Sieger (born 1965), who joined the company in 1990, became managing director of Sieger Design Consulting in 1991, and Michael Sieger (born 1968) became creative director.

Dieter Sieger is still active as a designer today. His "Masterpieces" collection comprises minimalist designs for furniture, lighting and accessories. In addition, he has also turned his attention to painting. He lives with his wife Fransje in Münster.

== Work ==
=== Architecture ===
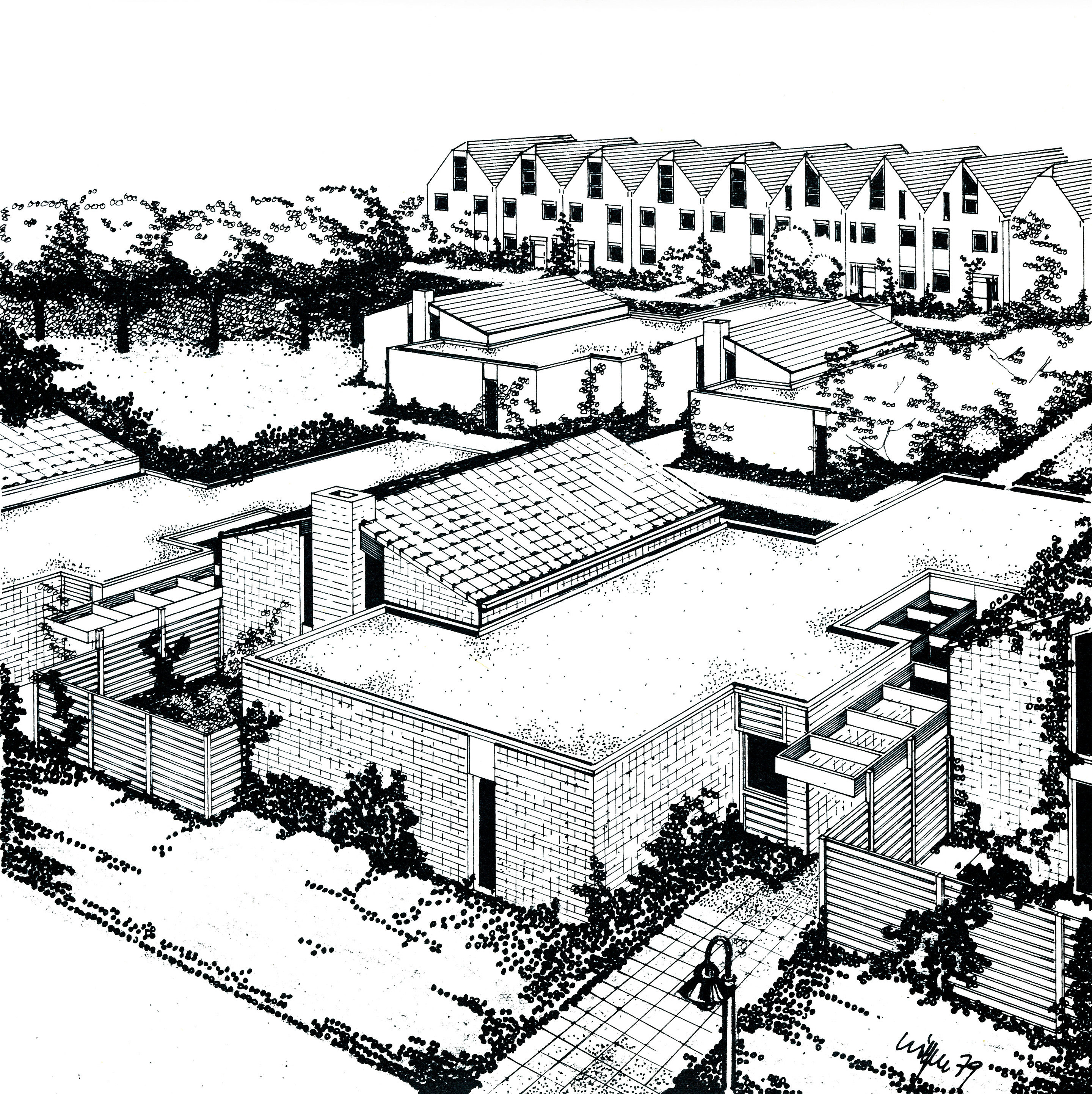
Residential buildings

Between 1964 and 1980, Sieger designed over 500 detached and terraced houses and housing estates. In the beginning, he carried out the marketing for the buildings himself. His breakthrough as an architect came in 1970 with a multi-award-winning terraced housing estate in Albachten. He also worked on large-scale projects such as NATO quarters and industrial/office buildings, including the Duravit factory in Meißen and Ritzenhoff's main office in Marsberg. Sieger also worked on projects in Greece, Spain, France, Saudi Arabia and the USA.

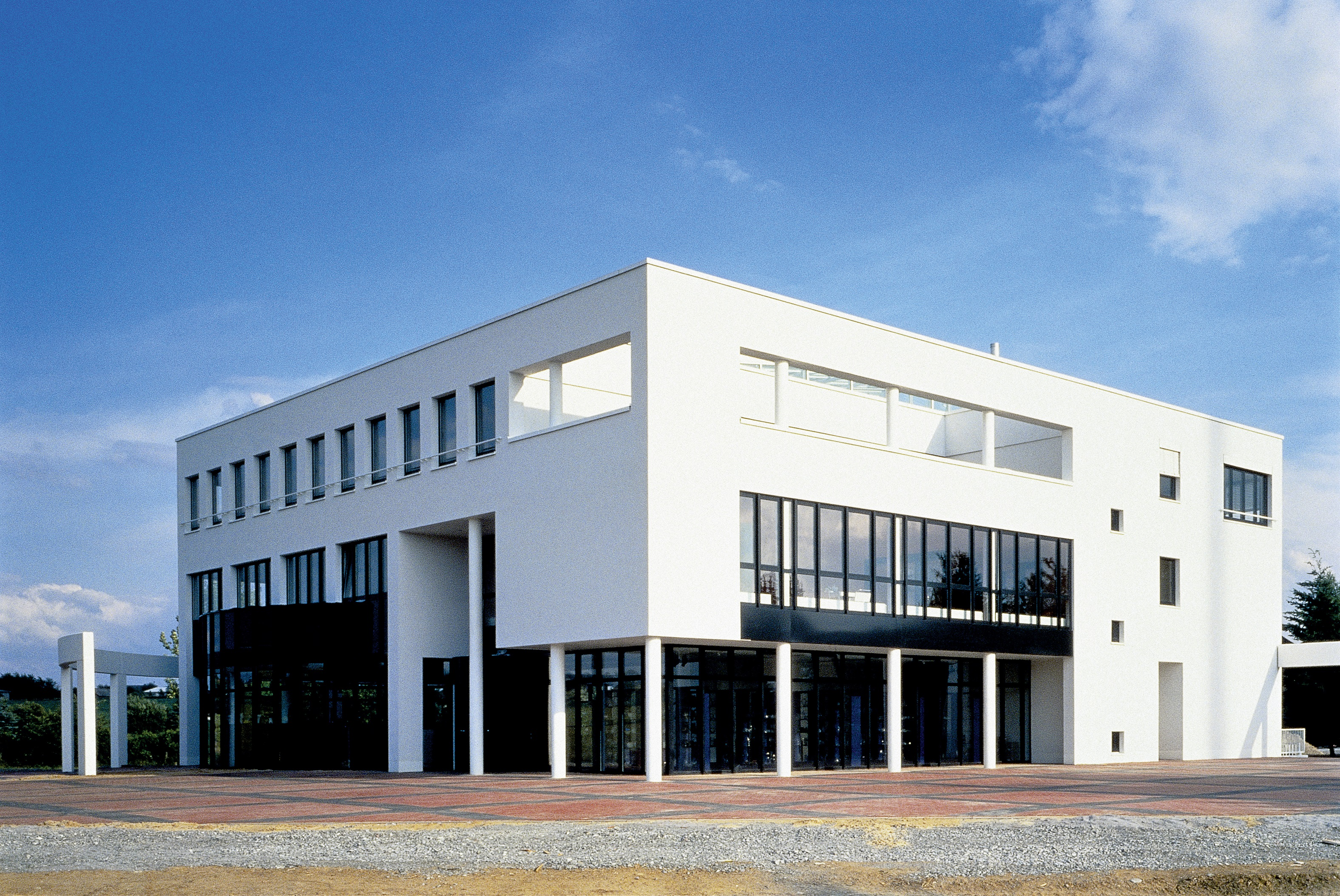
Ritzenhoff (Marsberg)

Sieger's architectural design is characterised by highly practical floor plans, the use of cutting-edge technology and a close integration into the natural environment, something that often also incorporated into the garden design. His “garden courtyard houses” have a highly transparent design, with an unobstructed line of sight extending from the entrance right through to garden courtyard. Sieger attached particular value to turnkey construction at a time when it was still viewed very critically by the Association of German Architects (BDA).

As early as in the mid-1960s, Sieger anticipated future trends by designing the bathrooms for his houses himself, instead of having bathroom fitters do it. He was one of the first architects to fit bathrooms with two washbasins and specially made mirrored cabinets.

In the 1990s, Sieger accepted numerous interior architecture projects, including designs for networks of branches (e.g. for WestLotto and Deutsche Bahn) and premium one-off locations (e.g. restaurants and theatres).

=== Yachts ===
In the late 1970s, Sieger began designing sailing boats and motor yachts. He focused in particular on a revolutionary modern interior design that moved away from traditional wooden fittings and furnishings. When a Trintella 42 from the Dutch shipyard Anne Wever was exhibited at the Düsseldorf International Boat Show ("boot") in 1979, Sieger's designs set a new trend for modern, contemporary interiors on seagoing yachts.

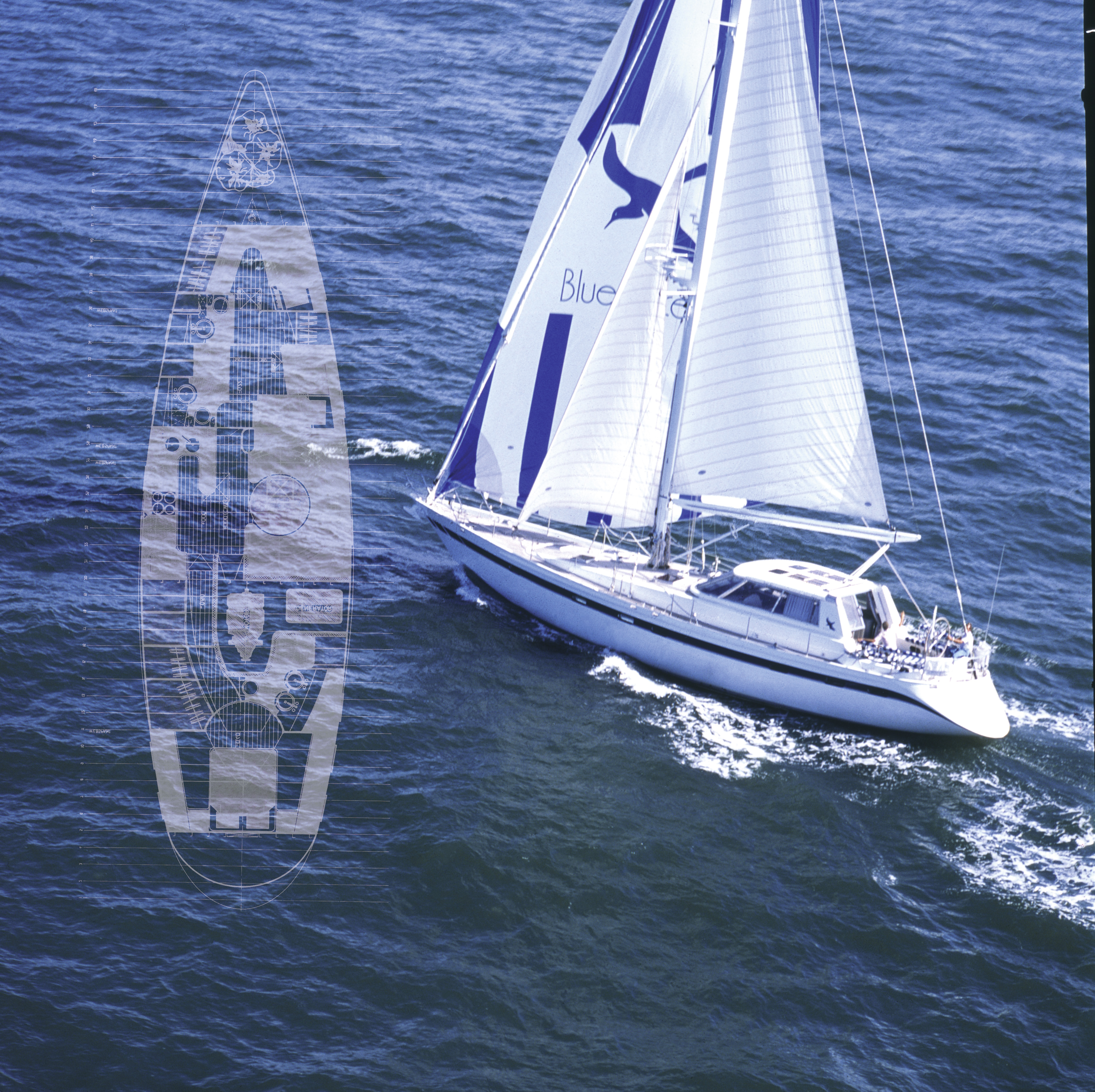
Blue Ocean

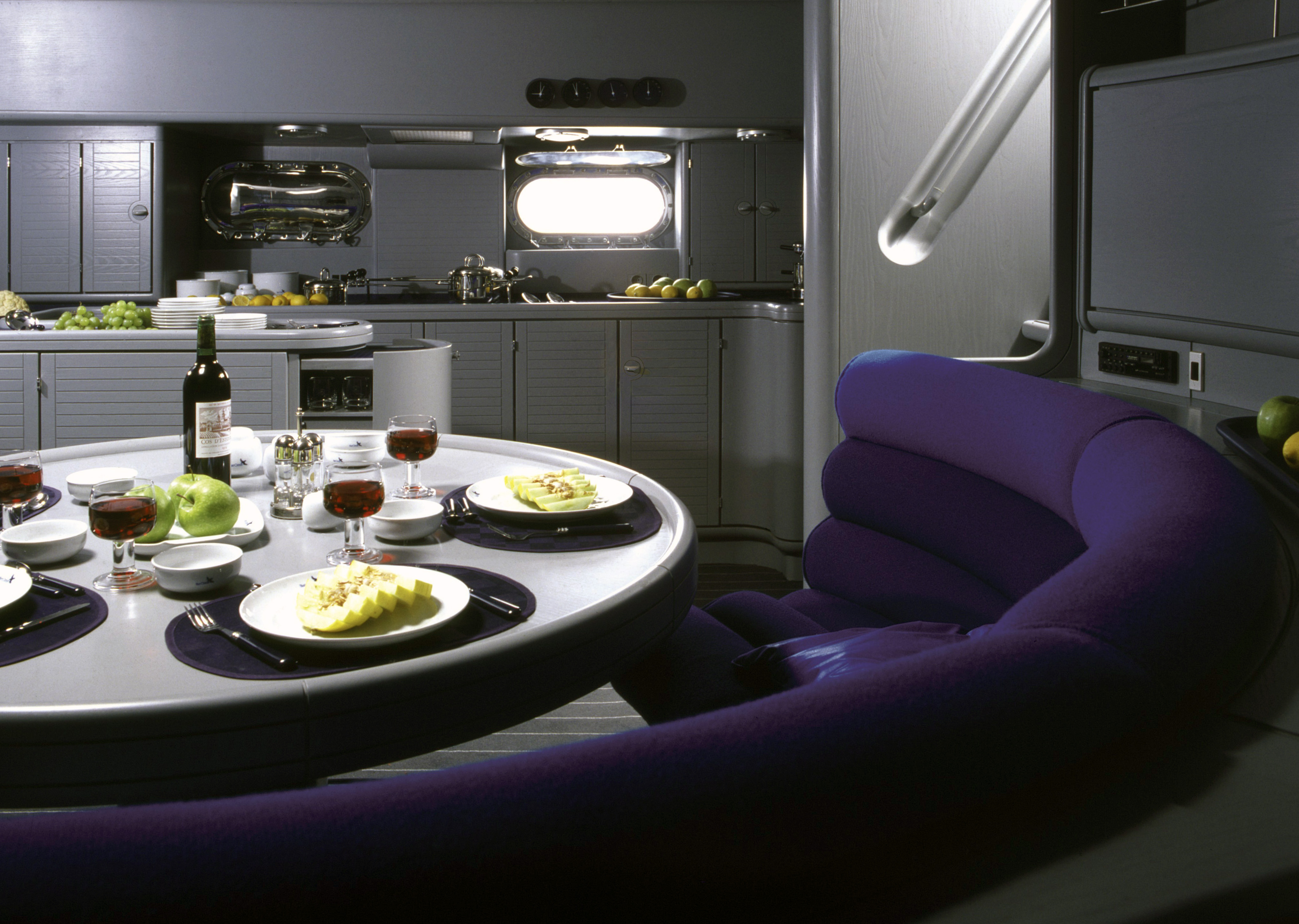
Blue Ocean Interior

Sieger collaborated with ship designers including Ron Holland from Swan, Peter Belsnyder and German Frers. Blue Ocean, a 65-foot yacht with an aluminium hull from the Heesen shipyard, became the largest vessel ever to be exhibited at boot Düsseldorf (1982), with Sieger's interior design in particular helping to make it a crowd-puller. In total, Sieger designed interiors for around 30 yachts for clients across the world over a ten-year period. Reports about his boat design work appeared in all the leading industry magazines, including Yachting Boat, Boote, Yacht and Exclusive Nautica.

=== Design ===
Sieger's design work is influenced by his background as an architect. His designs are characterised by basic geometric shapes, minimalist aesthetics and an elegant style. They reflect his extensive knowledge of the history of 20th-century design and of the contemporary design scene. One distinctive feature of Sieger's approach is his close attention to the feasibility of his designs. He carries out meticulous tests of materials, and studies the production process in depth. His designs are always conceived as part of a holistic strategy that often also includes packaging and marketing.

==== Bathroom design ====
In the early 1980s, Sieger captured a new market. At that time, Italy was the dominant force in bathroom design, and Germany lagged behind in terms of innovation. He understood bathrooms as an integral part of everyday living spaces, and designed bathrooms with coordinated fittings. Bathroom furnishings would prove to be Sieger's most successful field of activity. Some of his designs became design classics within a very short space of time.

Sieger's first bathroom products were for Alape, a company specialising in enamel basins. In 1983, the multicoloured washbasin LavarSet and the accompanying accessories range were exhibited at ISH in Frankfurt at a specially designed stand. The washbasins, shelves, mirrors and lights harked back to Sieger's designs for ship and yacht interiors.

Sieger revolutionised German bathroom design with “Domani”, a mixer tap that he developed for Dornbracht in the mid-1980s. The design for the tap paved the way for new forms and ideas. It won many awards, and in June 1985 was featured on the cover of MD – Interior Design Architecture. The following year, Sieger won the 'Japanese State Award for Design' for Domani.

Sieger's archetypal cross-handle tap "Tara" was highly influential, and many copycat designs appeared on the market. The cross handle was a contemporary reinterpretation of early bathroom design. Today, Tara is considered a Dornbracht design icon. It can be found in many leading hotels across the world, including W Hollywood (Los Angeles), Grand Hyatt (Tokyo), Swissôtel Krasnye Holmy (Moscow) and the Dolder Grand (Zurich), a six-star hotel designed by Norman Foster.

For Duravit, Sieger developed designs including Giamo, a series based on circular forms. The series was exhibited at a postmodern-looking stand at ISH in 1987. It represents the first complete bathroom furniture concept in the history of the bathroom industry, with coordinated products from several different manufacturers. Looking back, Duravit describes its collaboration with Sieger as the start of its highly successful design strategy.

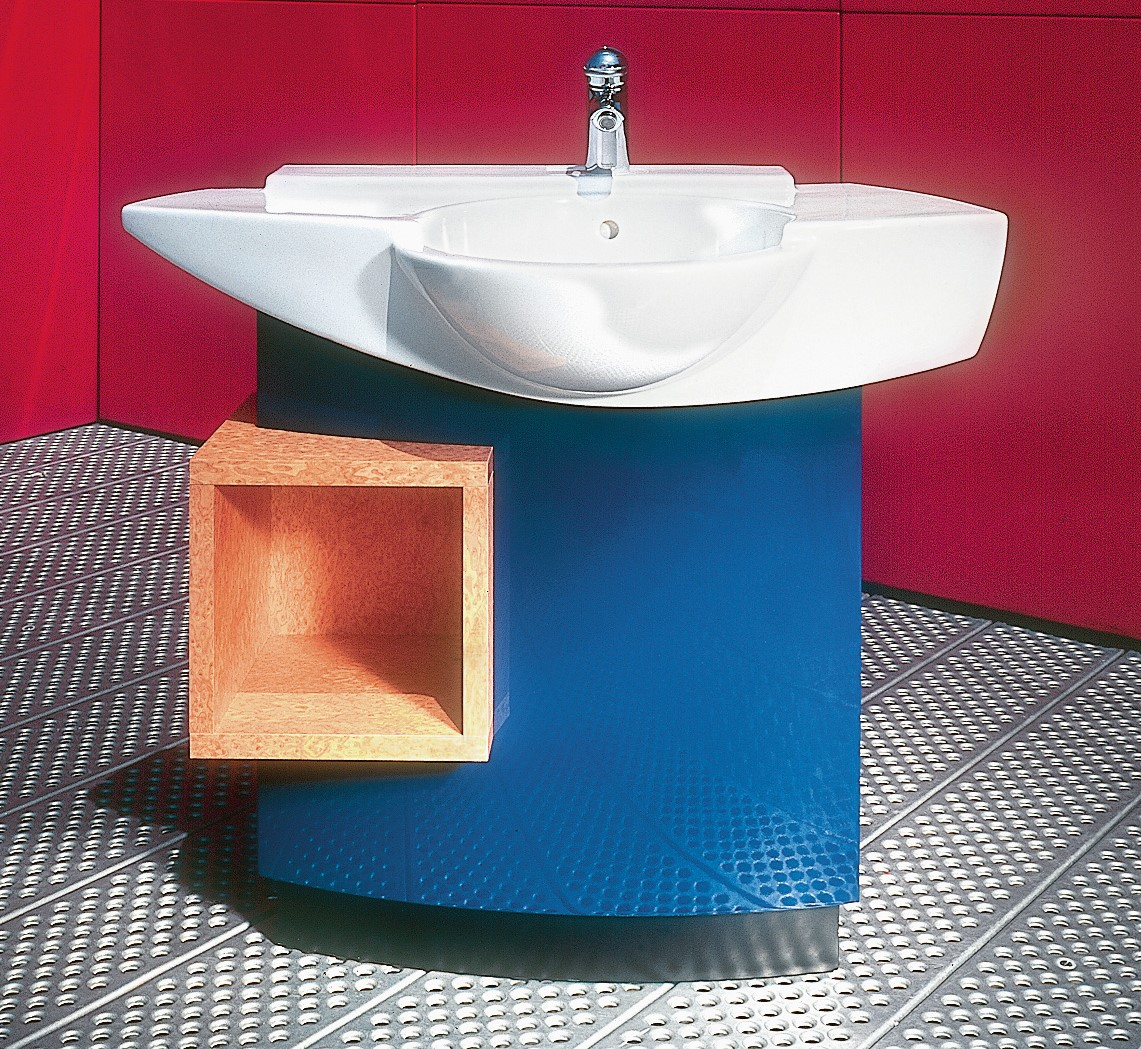
Lavilette

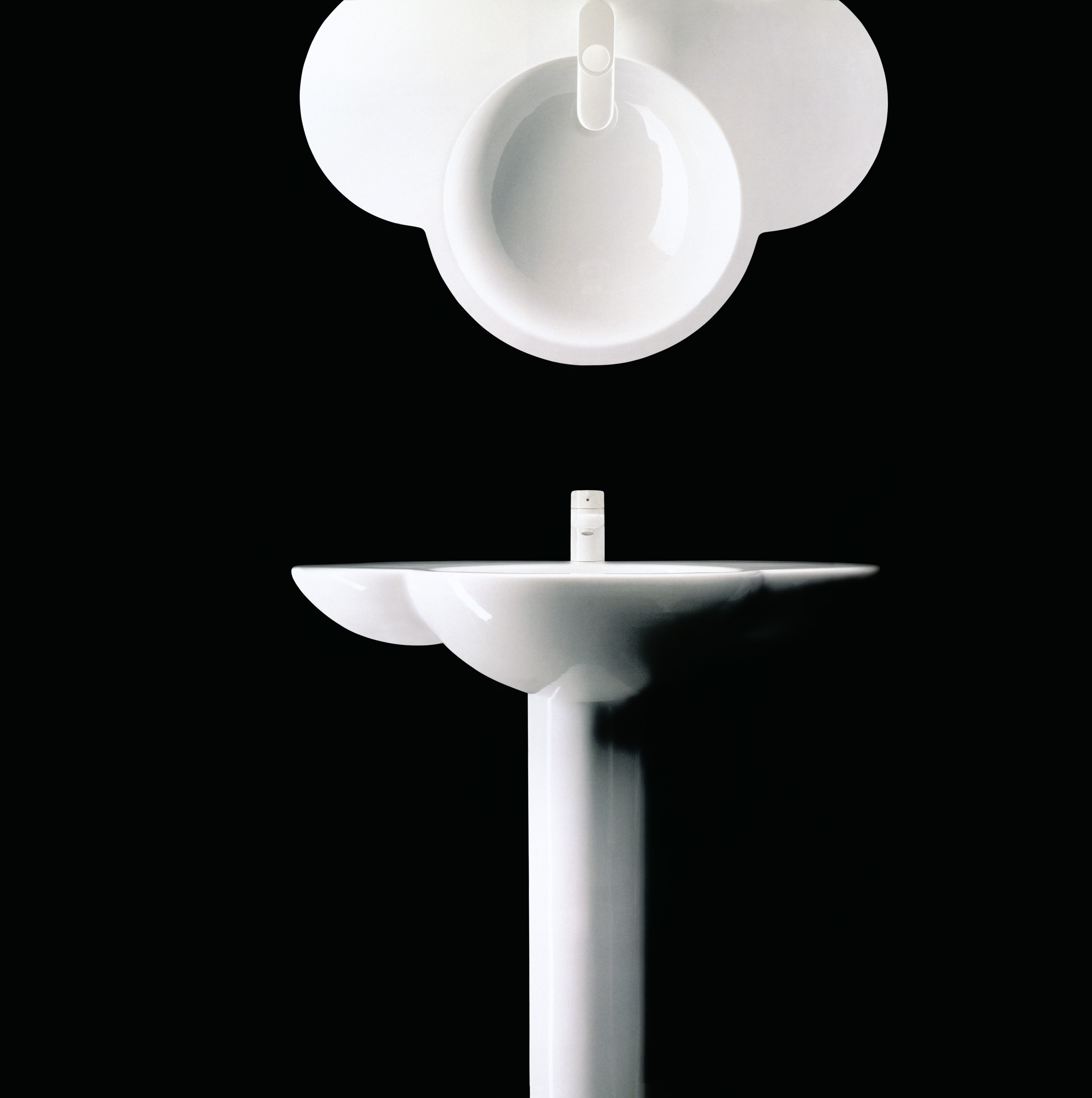
Giamo

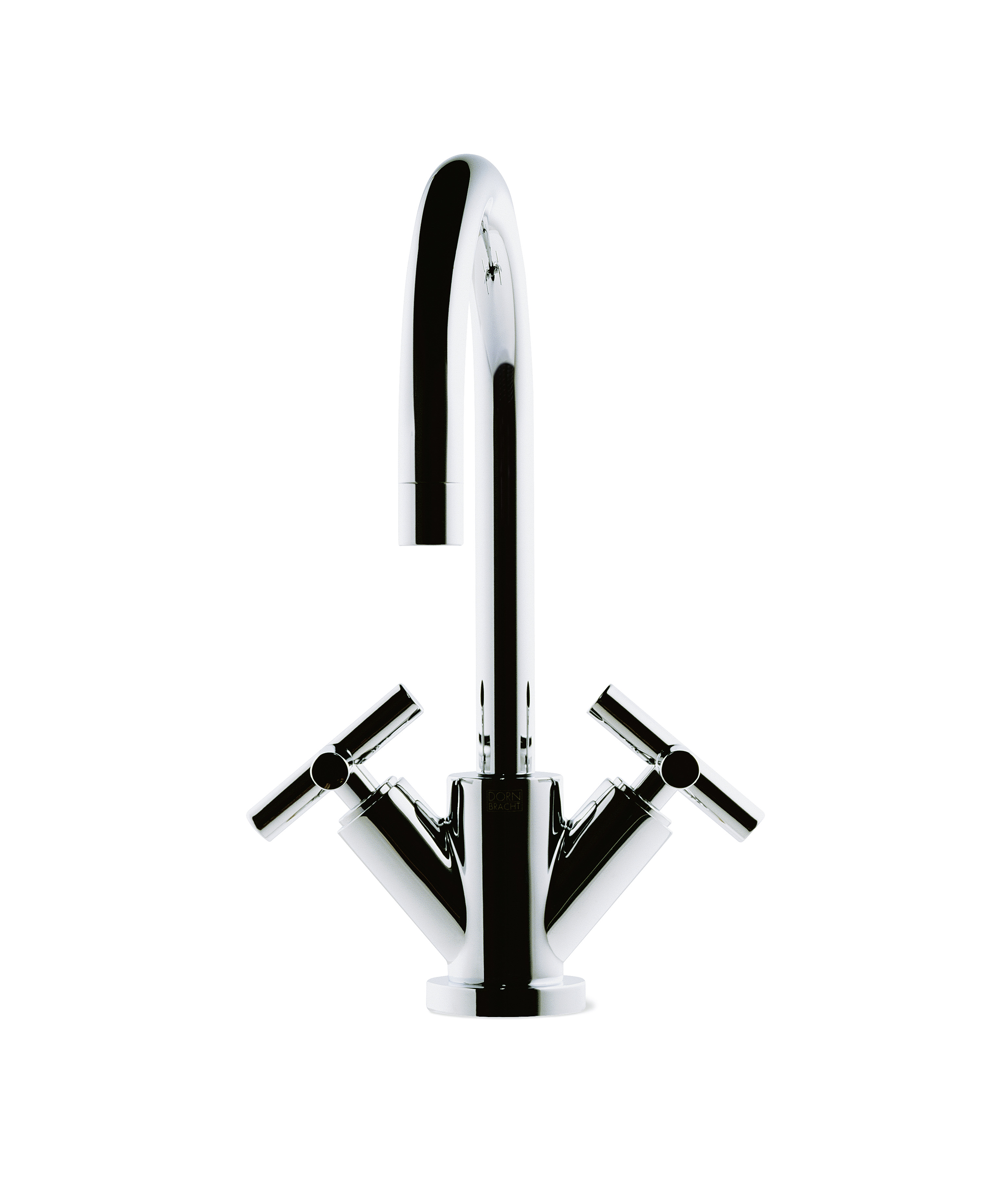
Tara

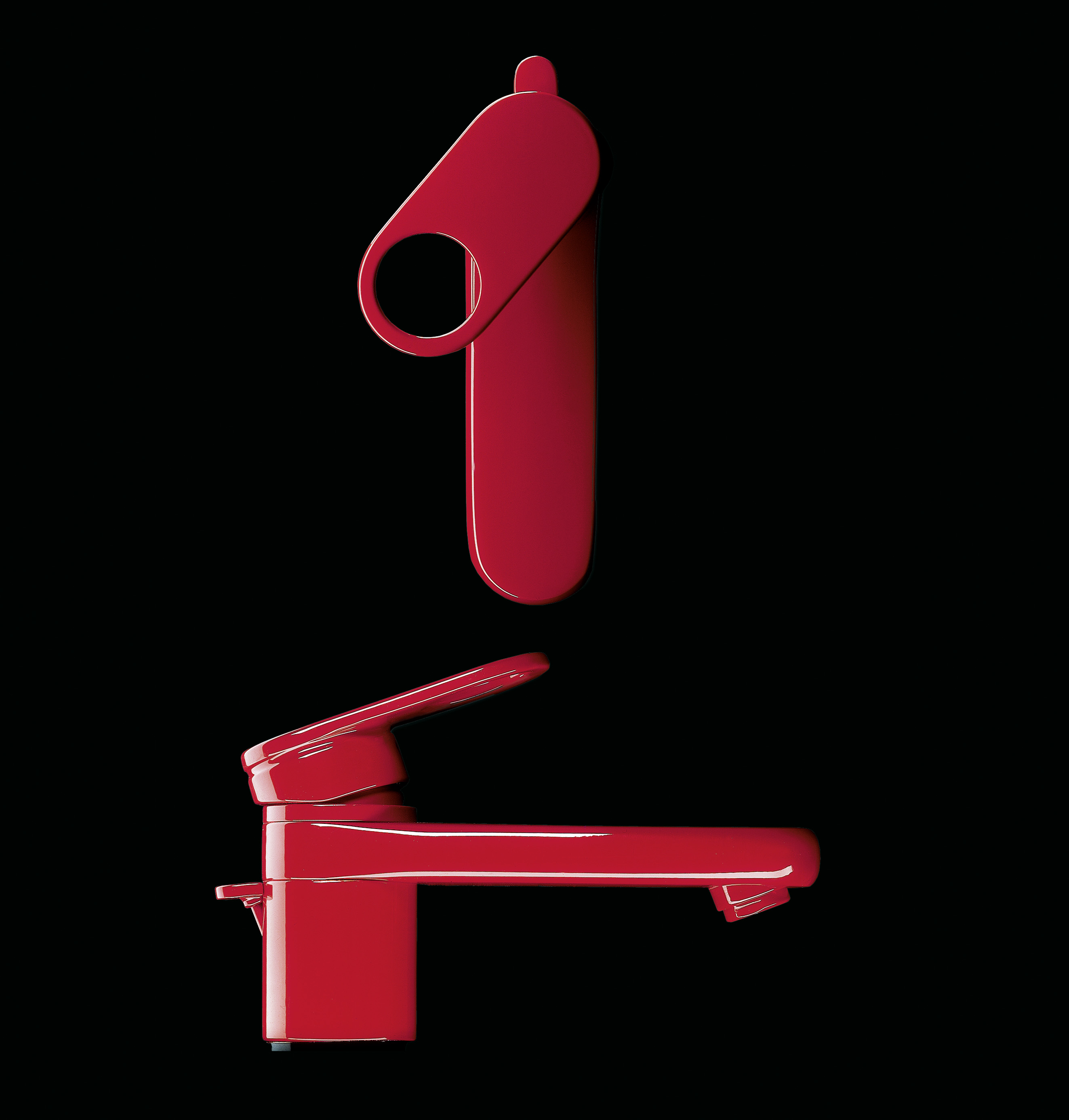
Domani

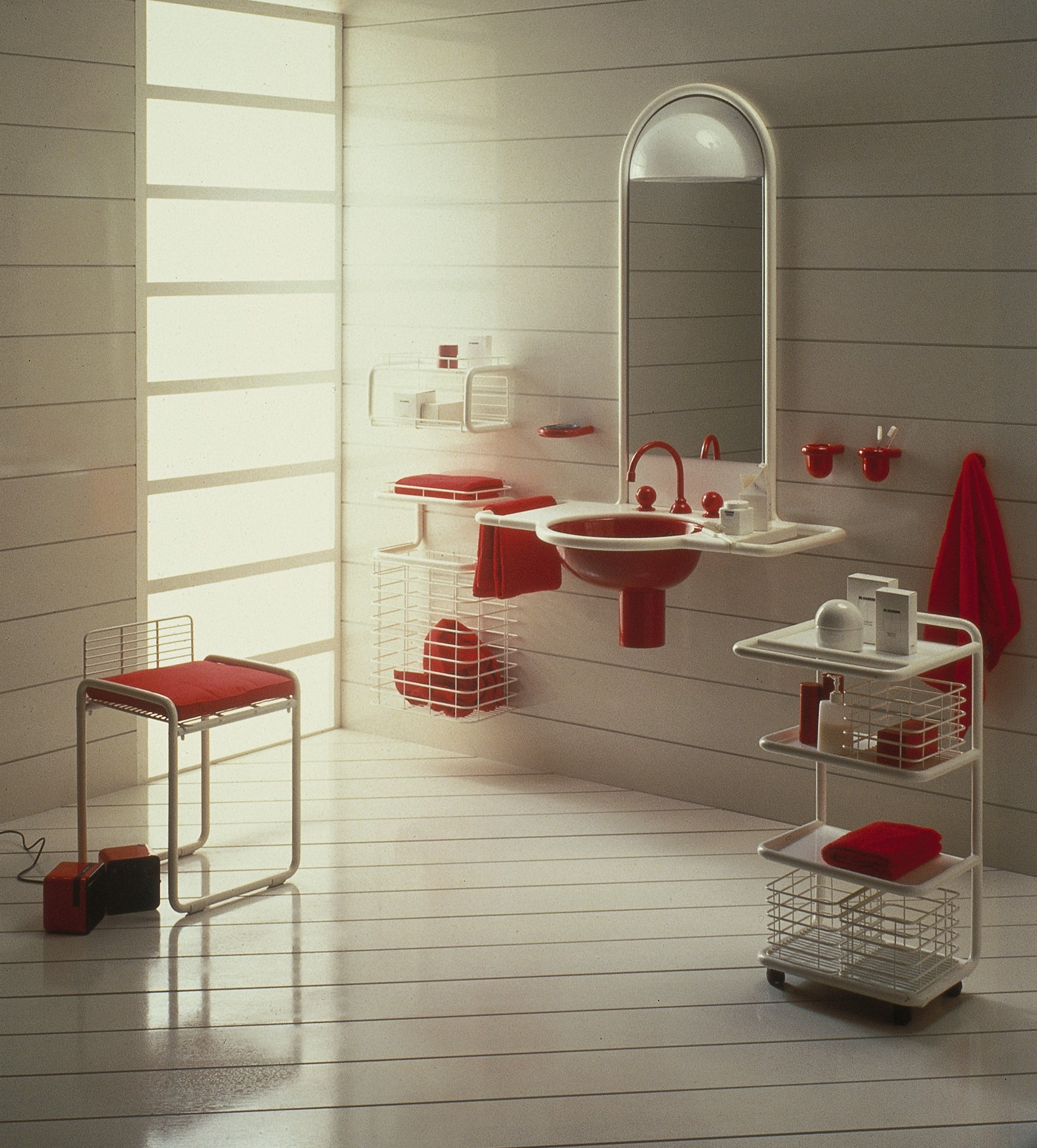
LavarSet

==== Product design ====
Dieter Sieger's applied design products include:

- Bags and suitcases (Scala for Dey, 1989)
- Door handles (SO 8820 for Ogro, 1989)
- Tile series (Cinema for AWS, Picto for Agrob, both 1987)
- Lights (the table and standard lamp Bird for GKS-Leuchten, 1989; Doppio and Becco wall lights/series for GKS-Leuchten, Bolero for Peill + Putzler, 1990; Puccini, Zazou, Piazza, Perdita, Ninas for Peill + Putzler, 1992)
- Mirrored cabinets (for Twick & Lehrke)
- Vase collections (for Ritzenhoff, 1992)
- Porcelain (including the architecturally inspired series Cult for Arzberg, 1993)
- Watches and jewellery (including the watch “Dieter Sieger No.1”, which won the Chronos innovation award in 2002, and the diamond collection “Bugatti Diamond Luxuries” developed for Bugatti)
- Cutlery (the Materia series for WMF, 1997)
- Technical appliances (the instantaneous water heater DHE for Stiebel Eltron, 1991; the compact storage tank KS for Stiebel Eltron, the cigarette machine Passepartout for Harting, 1992; the fast heater CK for Stiebel Eltron, 1993)

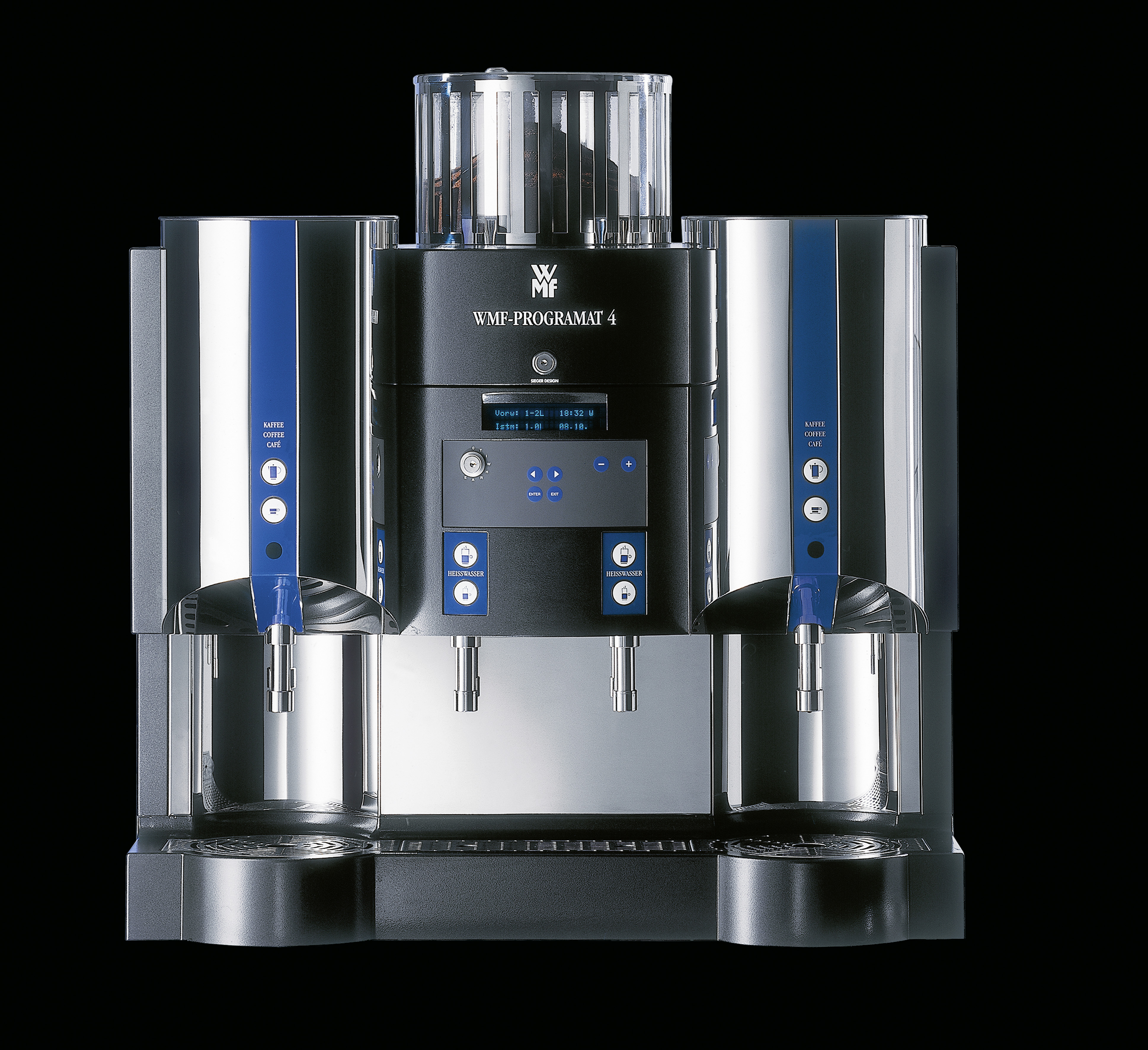
WMF Programat

In 1992, Sieger developed the design for the coffeemaker Programat 4, including its technical features. This highly intuitive appliance for professional use became a design icon and brought sieger design international renown.

"Ritzenhoff", a milk glass project initiated by sieger design, achieved cult status in the 1990s. For Ritzenhoff, a glass manufacturer based in Marsberg, having a new brand and expanded sales channels represented a quantum leap. The first glass was designed by Michael Sieger. Over 250 world-renowned designers contributed designs for the simple conical milk glass, including Ettore Sottsass, Alessandro Mendini, Aldo Cibic, Michael Graves, Coop Himmelb(l)au and Shigeru Uchida. Sieger Design ceased to be involved in managing the mass product in 2005, but resumed its collaboration with Ritzenhoff in 2017.

==== Masterpieces ====
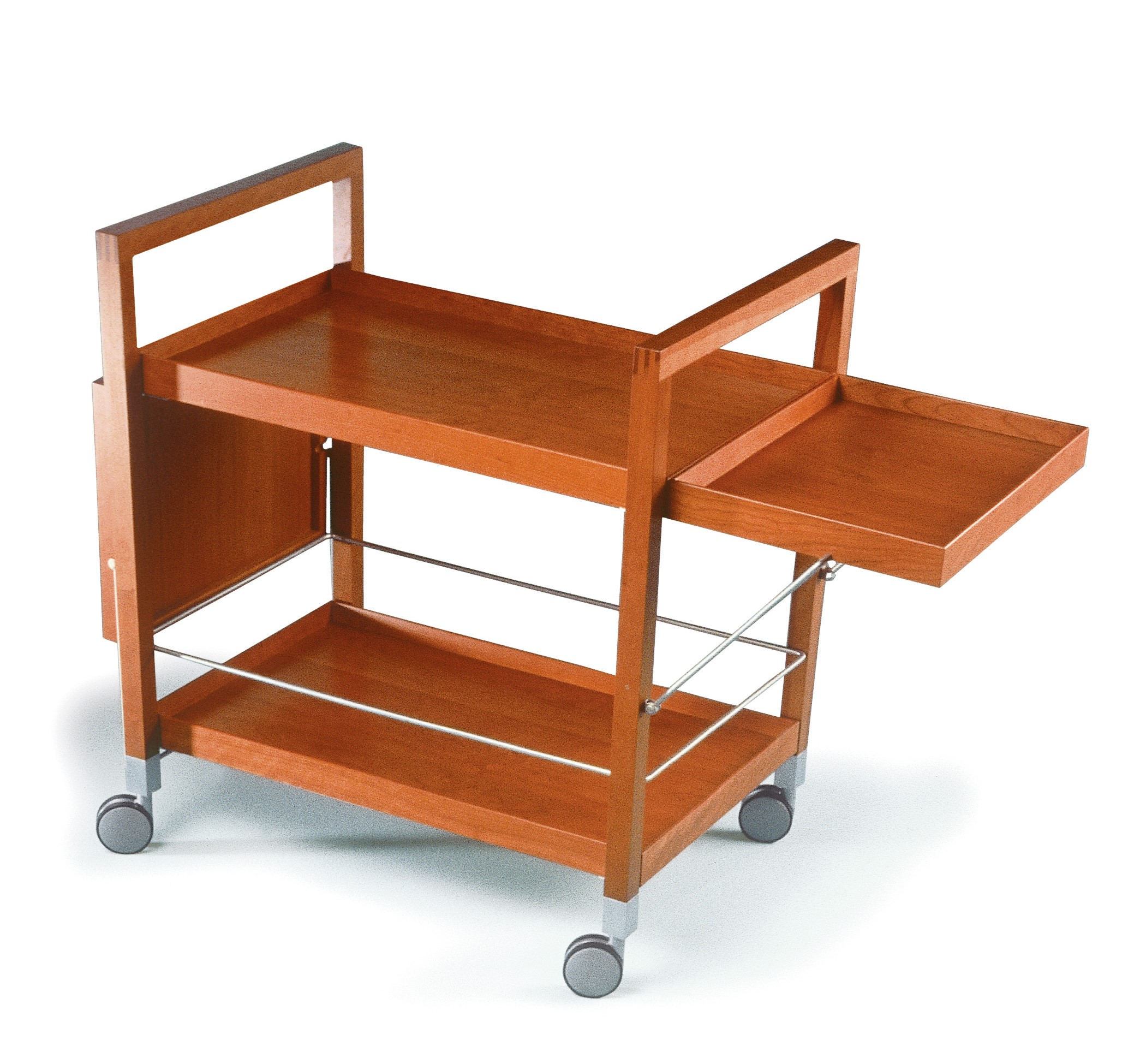
Tea trolley

"Masterpieces" is a collection of designer furniture, lights and accessories that Sieger has been working on continuously since 2003. These items are not commissioned by clients, but emerge solely out of Sieger's personal needs and ideas. Their geometric minimalism and architectonic lines express his distinctive aesthetic, and they are made with a superb artisanry that reflects his keen understanding of materials.

=== Painting ===
Since 2003, Sieger has devoted increasing attention to painting. This marks a return to the earliest stages of his career, when he earned his first money with drawings.

Sieger began working as an architect and interior/product designer at a time when designs were still sketched on paper; it was only in the 1980s that computers began to take over much of this work. However, even today he still prefers drawing things himself. His paintings exhibit an aesthetic that appears to have emerged primarily out of his early landscape and architectural sketches. His work stands in the tradition of abstract painters such as Lyubov Sergeyevna Popova, Piet Mondrian, Paul Klee and Serge Poliakoff. Poliakoff can be considered a particularly important influence on Sieger's geometrically inspired works – not least because the second work that Sieger acquired as a young art collector was a large Poliakoff, which he has laid eyes on every day since 1968.

Besides his geometrically styled works, Sieger also produces vividly coloured paintings that depart completely from linear forms, recalling artworks of Ernst Wilhelm Nay. Contrasting with the sharp, meticulous lines of his design work, these paintings are expressions of emotion and celebrations of imprecision that reflect his great understanding of colour and form. The arrangement of areas of colour appears spontaneous, unconstrained for once by function. Lines, the most important element in sketches and technical drawings, are increasingly disappearing from Sieger's painting, which can be understood as the polar opposite to his industrial design.

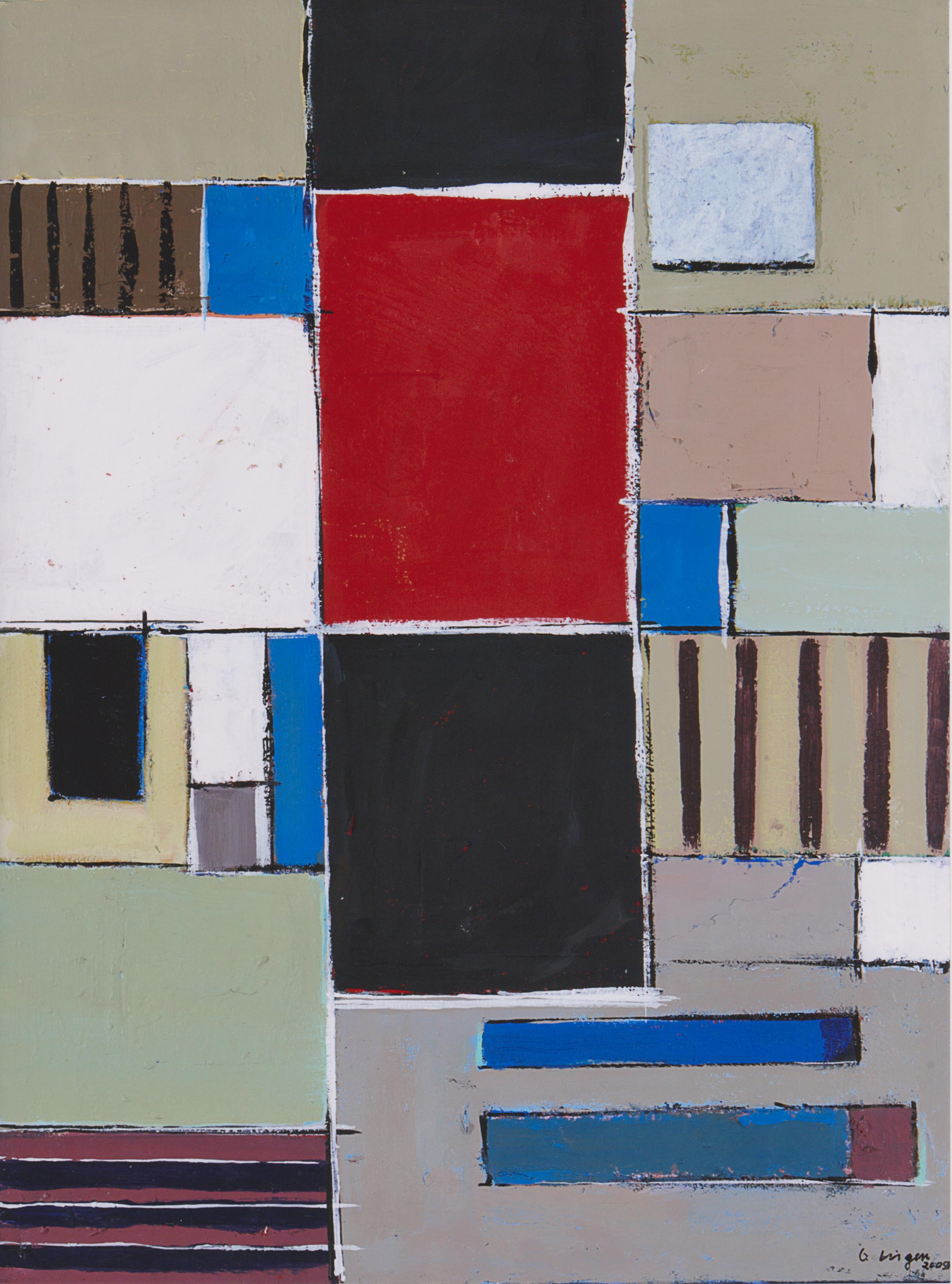
Untitled, 2009

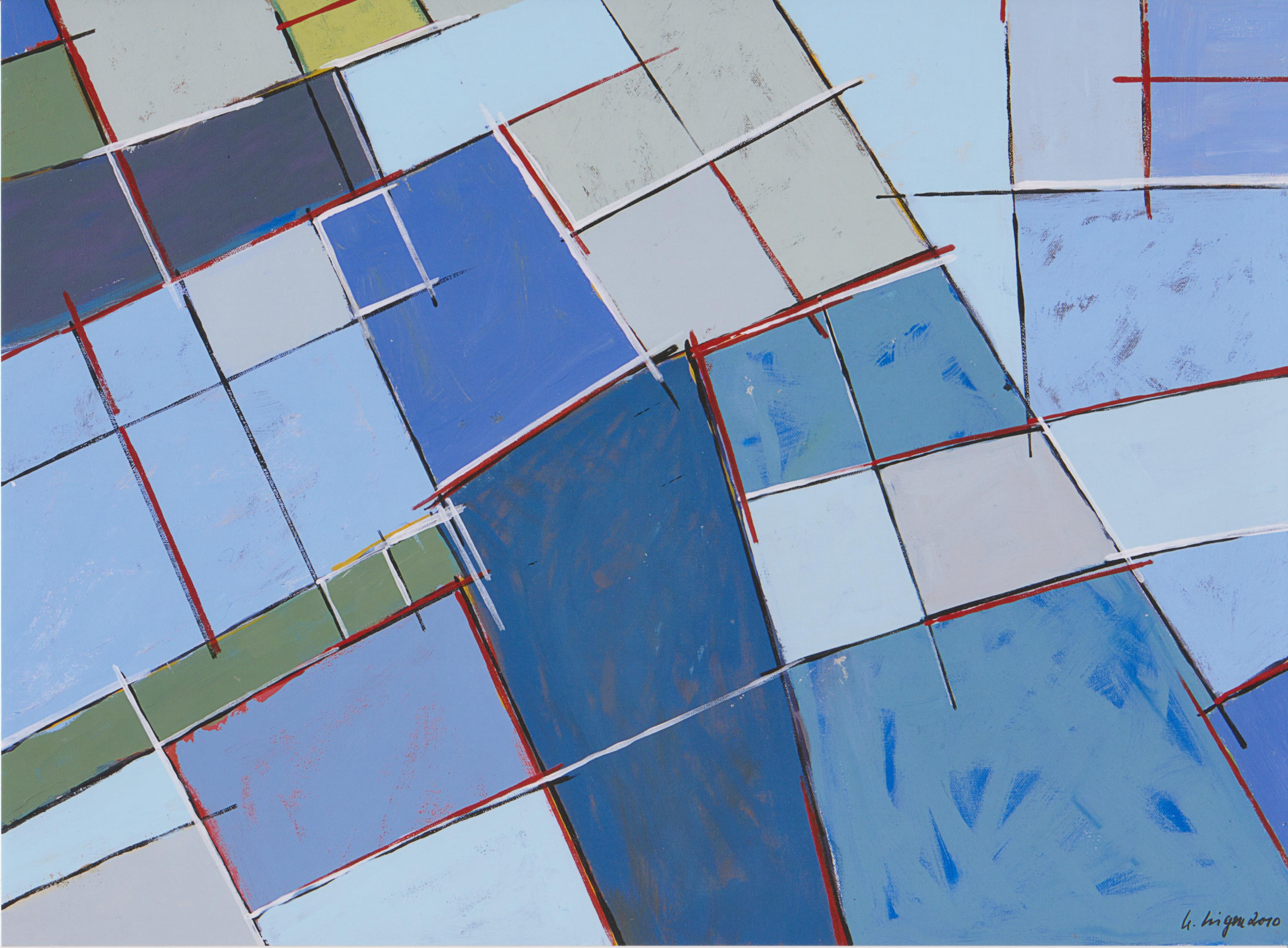
Untitled, 2010

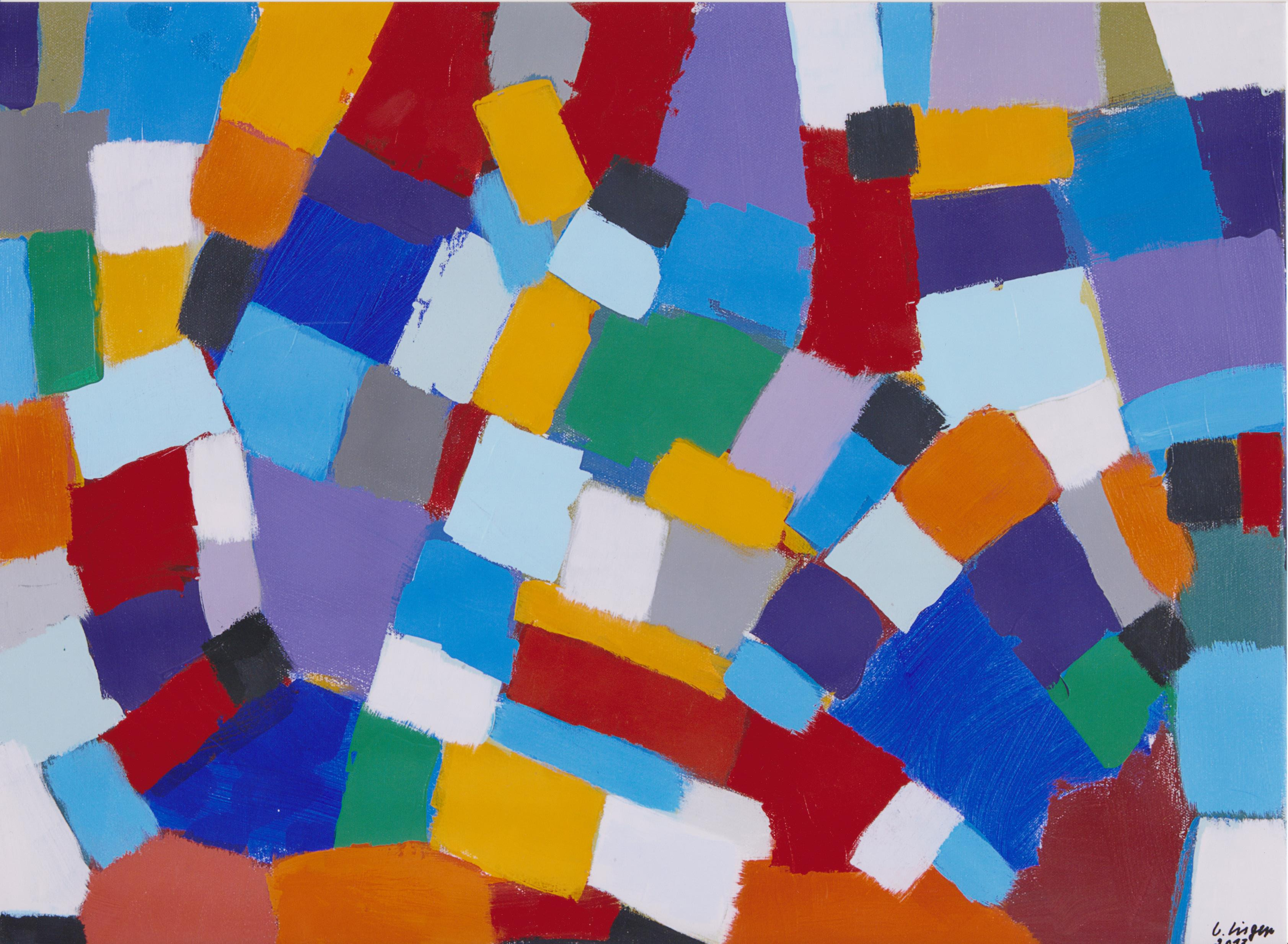
Untitled, 2013

== Awards (selected) ==
2009: Aqua Cultura award for services to the German bathroom industry

2002: DDC award for overall presentation of Blome

1989: Dutch state award for design for Domani tap (Dornbracht), Goed Industrieel Ontwerp

1988: Japanese state award for design for Point tap (Dornbracht), Good Prize for Foreign Product

1987: North Rhine-Westphalian state award for design and innovation for Domani tap (Dornbracht) and LavarLo washstand and mirror

1986: Japanese state award for Domani tap (Dornbracht)

iF product design award: award for good design, Industrie Forum Design Hannover │ 2001: TG 9830 door handle for Orgo, 1997: Milch + Kakao for Arzberg, 1995: Tara tap for Dornbracht, Tara Classic tap for Dornbracht, 1994: milk glass collection for Ritzenhoff, 1993: glass collection for Ritzenhoff, Programat 4 coffeemaker for WMF, 1991: ETW Ethermat electronic heat accumulator for Stiebel Eltron

iF product design award: award for ecology and design, Industrie Forum Design Hannover │ 1995: Cult dinner service for Arzberg

iF communication design award │ 1999: exhibition stand for Mubea

Special distinction “Die gute Industrieform”, Hannover │ 1992: Dal Adagio lavatory cistern for DAL, 1991: DHE instantaneous water heater for Stiebel Eltron, 1986: LavarLo washstand and mirror for Alape, Domani shower and bathtub for Düker

Red Dot Best of the Best, Design Centre North Rhine-Westphalia │ 2002: eMote infrared tap by Dornbracht

Red Dot Award: award for high design quality, Design Centre North Rhine-Westphalia │ 2000: Materia cooking knife for WMF, 1998: Get Fresh bathroom system solution for Kuhfuss, Cult dinner service for Arzberg, 1995: Cult dinner service for Arzberg, 1994: Tara tap for Dornbracht, 1993: milk glass collection for Ritzenhoff, 1987: Giamo washstand and bathroom furniture for Duravit

DDC award │ 2000: bronze for Fresh Up bathroom system for Kuhfuss, 1999: bronze for Materia cutlery for WMF Good Design Award Chicago │ 1999: decoration products for bathrooms for Octopus, Tara tap for Dornbracht, 1998: Materia cutlery for WMF, 1996: beer glass collection for Ritzenhoff

Certificate of Design Excellence, European Regional Design Annual │ 1997: beer glass packaging for Ritzenhoff

Special distinction “Design Plus”, International Fair Frankfurt │ 1995: Cult dinner service for Arzberg

NGZ Service Management Award, hotel design │ 1991: Garden Hotel No. 7, Hamburg

Award for innovative product design, IHK Southern Westphalia │ 1985: Domani tap for Dornbracht

== Exhibitions │ Collections (selected) ==
- 1994/95: "Dieter Sieger. Architekt, Schiffsbauer, Designer" (Dieter Sieger. Architect, Shipbuilder, Designer), Stadtmuseum Münster
- Since 1989: four designs on display at the Design Museum, London
- Since 1984: designs on display at Design-Center Stuttgart (presently 13 in total)
- Since 1985: designs on display at Die Neue Sammlung Design Museum, Munich
- Since 1991: designs on display in the permanent product exhibition at Design Centre North Rhine-Westphalia
