= Dosa =

Dosa may refer to:

== Belief ==
- Dosa or dvesha, a Buddhist concept of hate or aversion

== People ==
- Bogoljub Mitić Đoša (1968 - 2017), Serbian actor
- Csaba Dosa (born 1951), Romanian athlete
- Dosa ben Harkinas, Jewish Tanna sage
- Dosa ben Saadia (935 - 1018), Talmudic scholar and philosopher
- Edward Dosa-Wea Neufville (born 1976), Liberian sprinter
- Géza Dósa (1846–1871), Hungarian painter
- Hanina ben Dosa, first-century Jewish scholar
- Oba Cadius Dosa Akran, Nigerian politician
- Sara Dosa, American documentary director and producer

== Football ==
- Dominic Old Scholars Association SC, Australian football club
- DOSA-ALAVER, Dominican football team
- DOSA Football Club, Australian Australian rules football club

== Other ==
- Doṣa or dosha, a concept in Ayurvedic medicine
- Dosa (food), South Indian rice crepe
- Dosa (moth), a genus of moths
- Dosa plaza, chain of fast food restaurants
- Dosa, fashion label run by Christina Kim
- DOSA, the Department of Social Affairs from the British comedy television series The Thick of It
- DOSA, the Department of Statistical Anomalies from the American fantasy-adventure television series The Librarians (2014 TV series)

== See also ==
- Dossa Júnior (born 1986), Portuguese football player
- Dhosa, Jaynagar, a village and archeological site in India
