= Christina Kim (designer) =

American designer

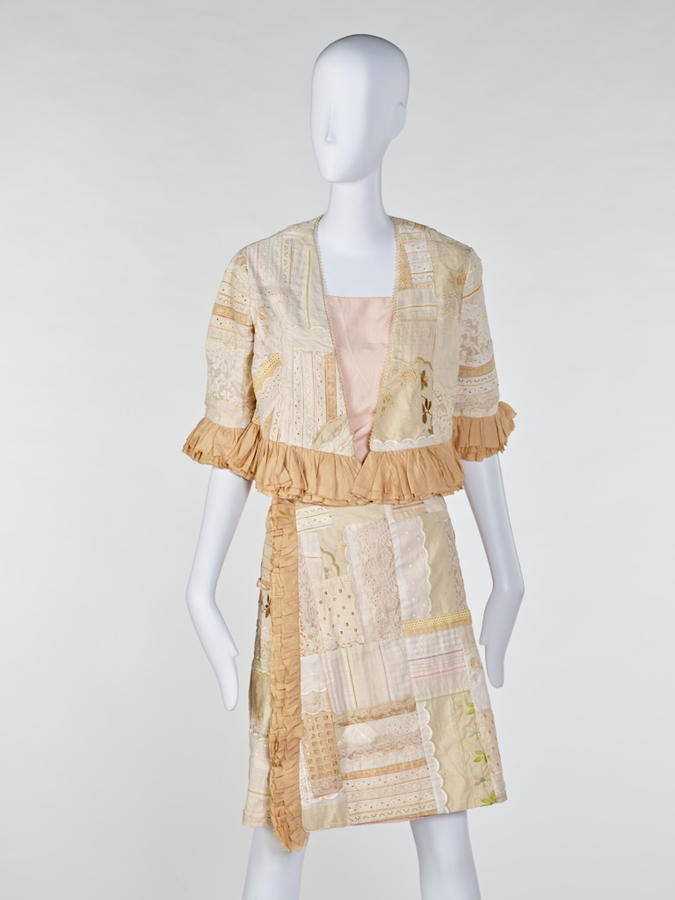
Woman's Suit Christina Kim for dosa; cotton embroidery and cotton lace patchwork, 2013

Christina Kim (born 1957) is a South Korean-born American designer, artist, and founder of dosa, a line of clothing, accessories, and housewares. Much of her work is inspired by her memories of her childhood in Korea, her teen years in Los Angeles, and her travels to Europe, Asia, and South America where she works with local artisans of all disciplines. Kim’s studio is based in downtown Los Angeles, California.

== Early life and education ==
Kim was born in 1957 in Seoul, South Korea, and moved to the United States in 1971. While studying painting and art history at the University of Washington, she was mentored by American painter Jacob Lawrence. Kim cites Lawrence as one of the major influences on her practice.

After university, Kim spent some time living in Italy, where she was approached by designers from an Italian menswear company who were interested in her outfits. They invited her to work with them to come up with color combinations for men’s shirting fabrics, which led Kim to learn how to design textiles.

== Work ==
=== dosa ===
After moving to New York City, Kim founded dosa in 1984 with her mother Vivian Kim. The name “dosa” was Vivian’s nickname given to her by American work colleagues when she immigrated to America. In Korean, dosa (Kr.: 도사) means sage or thinker. While production was based in Los Angeles, dosa’s first retail shop opened in the SoHo neighborhood of New York City in 1986 (and later closed in 2019). In 1994, dosa expanded its Los Angeles factory to allow design and production to share a single floor in one of the city’s many unoccupied historic buildings. dosa expanded again in 1999, moving into a loft large enough to accommodate all company operations, and continues to operate out of this space today.

dosa is recognized for its extensive use of traditional materials, shapes, and techniques. For many of dosa’s collections, Kim has worked with craftspeople in Bosnia, Cambodia, Chile, China, Colombia, India, Italy, Kenya, Korea, Japan, Mexico, and Peru.

dosa is also known for its commitment to zero waste and recycling practices, which Kim first instituted in 1992. Her most recent work at dosa is primarily focused on how to design textiles and engineer garments to utilize and minimize waste within a production cycle. For example, within a collection of clothing, some styles are designed to be patchworked from fabric leftover from the production of other garments within the line. Smaller offcuts of patched pieces are either used in large scale textile artworks or other recycling projects.

=== flyingfishprojects ===
flyingfishprojects is an extension of dosa that focuses on Kim’s artistic practice. The name officially began being used in 2019, but dosa has been commissioned and been making art projects since 2008. Kim does not typically refer to herself as an artist, but rather as a designer, or applied artist.

=== Collaborations ===
Kim has collaborated with Alice Waters, Heath Ceramics, Francisco Toledo, Trine Ellitsgaard, Hermès, Eames Foundation, SEWA (Self Employed Women's Association), and others.

== Exhibitions ==
=== Solo Exhibitions ===
Kim has had a number of solo exhibitions, including:

- Naturale, rigenerato, fatto a mano, Museo internazionale e biblioteca della musica di Bologna, Bologna, Italy (2008)
- banderas bandhani, Museo Textil de Oaxaca, Oaxaca, Mexico (2015)
- link between heaven and earth, Centro de las Artes de San Agustín (CASA), Oaxaca, Mexico (2018)
- desert flora from Moorten botanical garden in Palm Springs, Raymond Meier Studio, New York, New York (2019)
- blurring boundaries: hanbok revisited (한복을 꺼내다), Arumjigi Culture Keepers Foundation, Seoul, South Korea (2023)

=== Group Exhibitions ===
Kim has also participated in many international group exhibitions, including:

- Venice Biennale of Architecture, Venice, Italy (2016)
- Making is Thinking is Making: Triennale di Milano, Milan, Italy (2016)
- Scraps: Fashion, Textiles and Creative Reuse, Cooper Hewitt, Smithsonian Design Museum, New York, New York (2016)
- 5th Anyang Public Art Project, Anyang, Korea (2016)
- Earth Matters, TextielMuseum, Tilburg, The Netherlands (2017)
- Scraps: Fashion, Textiles and Creative Reuse, George Washington University Museum and Textile Museum, Washington, DC (2017)
- Scraps: Fashion, Textiles and Creative Reuse, Palm Springs Art Museum, Architecture and Design Center, Palm Springs, California (2018)
- Repair and Design Futures, Rhode Island School of Design Museum, Providence, Rhode Island (2018)
- Dreaming of Earth Project – The Real DMZ, Culture Station Seoul 284, Seoul, South Korea (2019)
- Boro Textiles: Sustainable Aesthetics, Japan Society, New York, New York (2020)
- TurnTurnTurn, Paju Typography Institute, Paju, South Korea (2022–ongoing)
- Blue Gold, Mingei International Museum, San Diego, California (2024)

== Awards and recognition ==
- 2004: Named as an Innovator / Planet Protector by Time Magazine
- 2006: Innovation in Craft Award, Aid to Artisans, Washington, DC
- 2006: LongHouse Reserve Design Award, LongHouse Reserve, East Hampton, New York
- 2011: Kim was commissioned by Michelle Obama to make a gift for former first lady Kim Yoon-Ok, spouse of former president Lee Myung-bak of South Korea
- 2017: Honorary Doctor of Fine Arts, Rhode Island School of Design, Providence, Rhode Island
- 2018: National Design Award, Cooper Hewitt, Smithsonian Design Museum, New York, New York

== Public collections ==
Kim’s work can be found in a number of public institutions, including:

- Anyang Public Art Project, Anyang, South Korea
- Arumjigi Culture Keepers Foundation, Seoul, South Korea
- Berlin International Film Festival (Berlinale), Berlin, Germany
- Centro de las Artes de San Agustín (CASA), Oaxaca, Mexico
- Cooper Hewitt, Smithsonian Design Museum, New York City, New York
- Hammer Museum, LULU, Los Angeles, California
- Museo internazionale e biblioteca della musica di Bologna, Bologna, Italy
- Museo Textil de Oaxaca, Oaxaca, Mexico
- Mingei International Museum, San Diego, California
- Pulitzer Arts Foundation, St. Louis, Missouri
- Rhode Island School of Design Museum, Providence, Rhode Island

== Other activities ==
Kim has guest lectured at Rhode Island School of Design, Harvard University, Indiana University Bloomington, ArtCenter College of Design, Otis College of Art and Design, Woodbury University, George Washington University Museum and Textile Museum, National Institute of Design, and World Hope Forum.

Kim was on the board of Alice Waters’ Edible Schoolyard Project from 2005 to 2015.

== Press ==
Kim has been featured in publications such as &premium, Architectural Digest, Bloom, Casa Brutus, Elle Decoration, Financial Times, Hole & Corner, Interni, JOYCE, ku:nel, kinfolk, Los Angeles Times, Marie Claire Maison, New York Textile Month, New York Times, Subsequence, Relax, The Telegraph, Time, Vogue, and The World of Interiors.
