= Four Seasons Hotel Taipei =

Hotel in Xinyi, Taipei, Taiwan

Four Seasons Hotel Taipei 臺北四季酒店
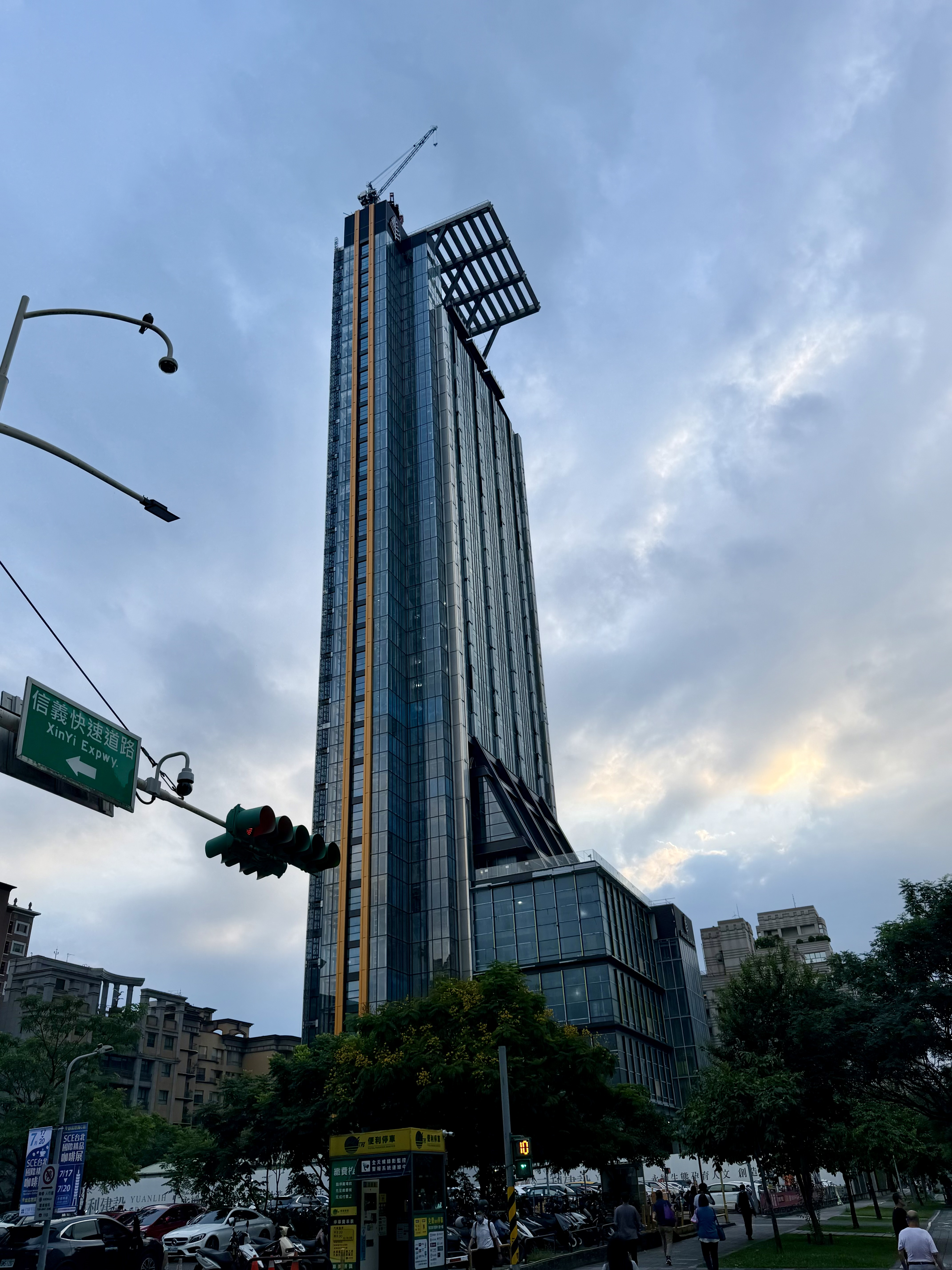
- Building under construction
- Interactive map of the Four Seasons Hotel Taipei 臺北四季酒店 area

General information
- Status: Topped-out
- Type: Office, Hotel
- Location: No. 100-1, Section 5, Xinyi Road, Xinyi District, Taipei, Taiwan
- Coordinates: 25°01′57″N 121°33′53″E
- Construction started: 2 January 2022
- Completed: 2026

Height
- Architectural: 180 m (590 ft)

Technical details
- Floor count: 31 above ground 4 below ground

Design and construction
- Architects: Yabu Pushelberg and Richard Rogers

Four Seasons Hotel Taipei (Chinese: 臺北四季酒店) is an topped-out skyscraper hotel located in Xinyi Planning District, Xinyi District, Taipei, Taiwan. The hotel held its groundbreaking ceremony on 2 January 2022 and is estimated to be completed by 2026. Upon completion, it will have a height of 180 m (590 ft), comprising 31 floors above ground and 4 below ground. The hotel is constructed by Yuanlih Group and jointly designed by Yabu Pushelberg and Richard Rogers.

== Location ==
The hotel is located directly opposite to Taipei 101 in the Xinyi Planning District, which contains numerous shopping centres, entertainment venues and tourist attractions, such as the Taipei World Trade Center, National Sun Yat-sen Memorial Hall and Taipei 101. It is one minute's walk from Taipei 101–World Trade Center metro station.

== Facilities ==
Four Seasons Hotel Taipei will be operated by Four Seasons Hotels and Resorts and will offer a total of 260 guest rooms and suites with city and mountain views, spanning a total of 31 floors. Aside from accommodation, the hotel will also include three restaurants, three bars and lounges, a fitness center, an outdoor pool and spa, two ballrooms, as well as meeting and event spaces.

== Gallery ==
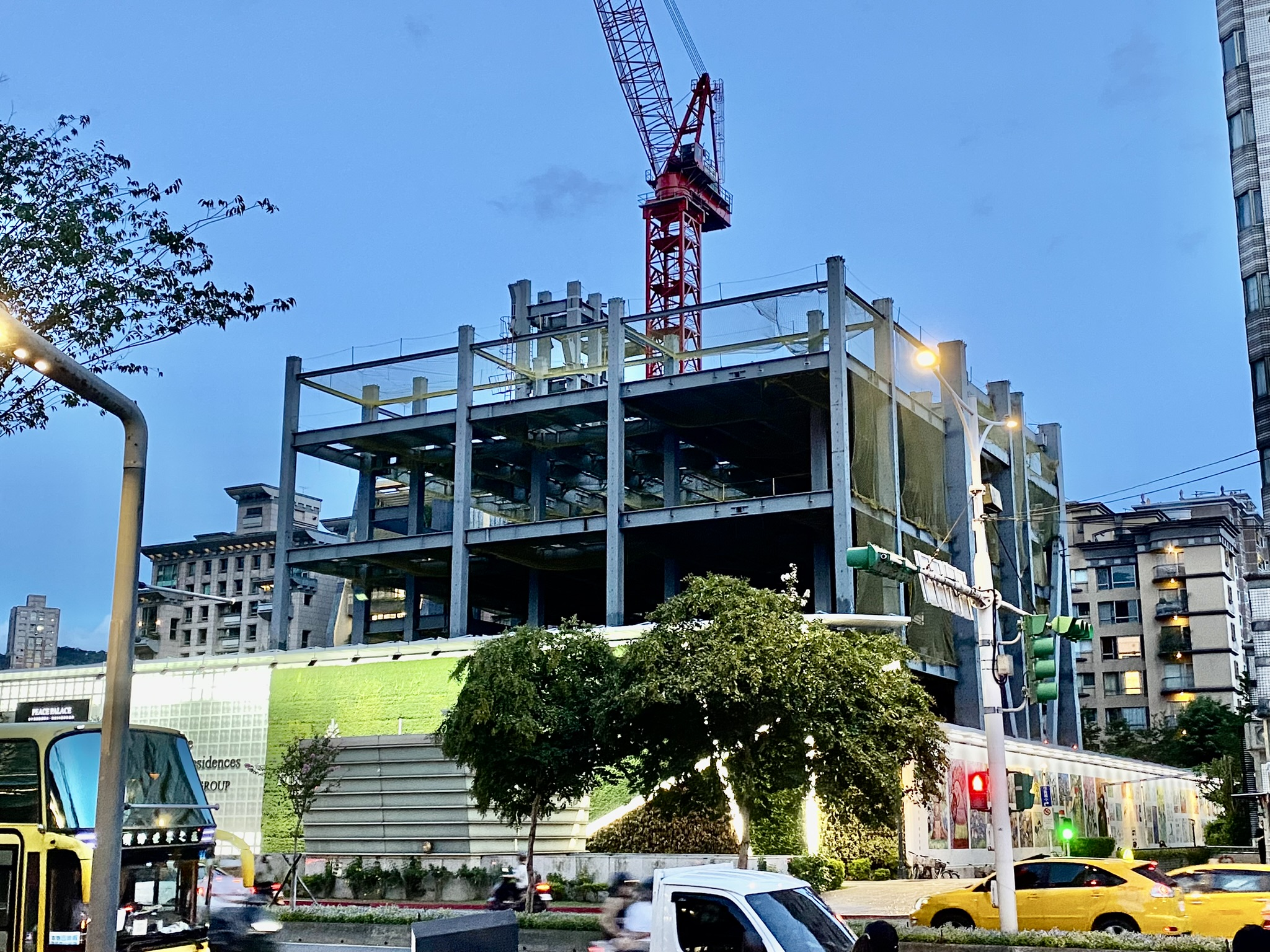
July 2023

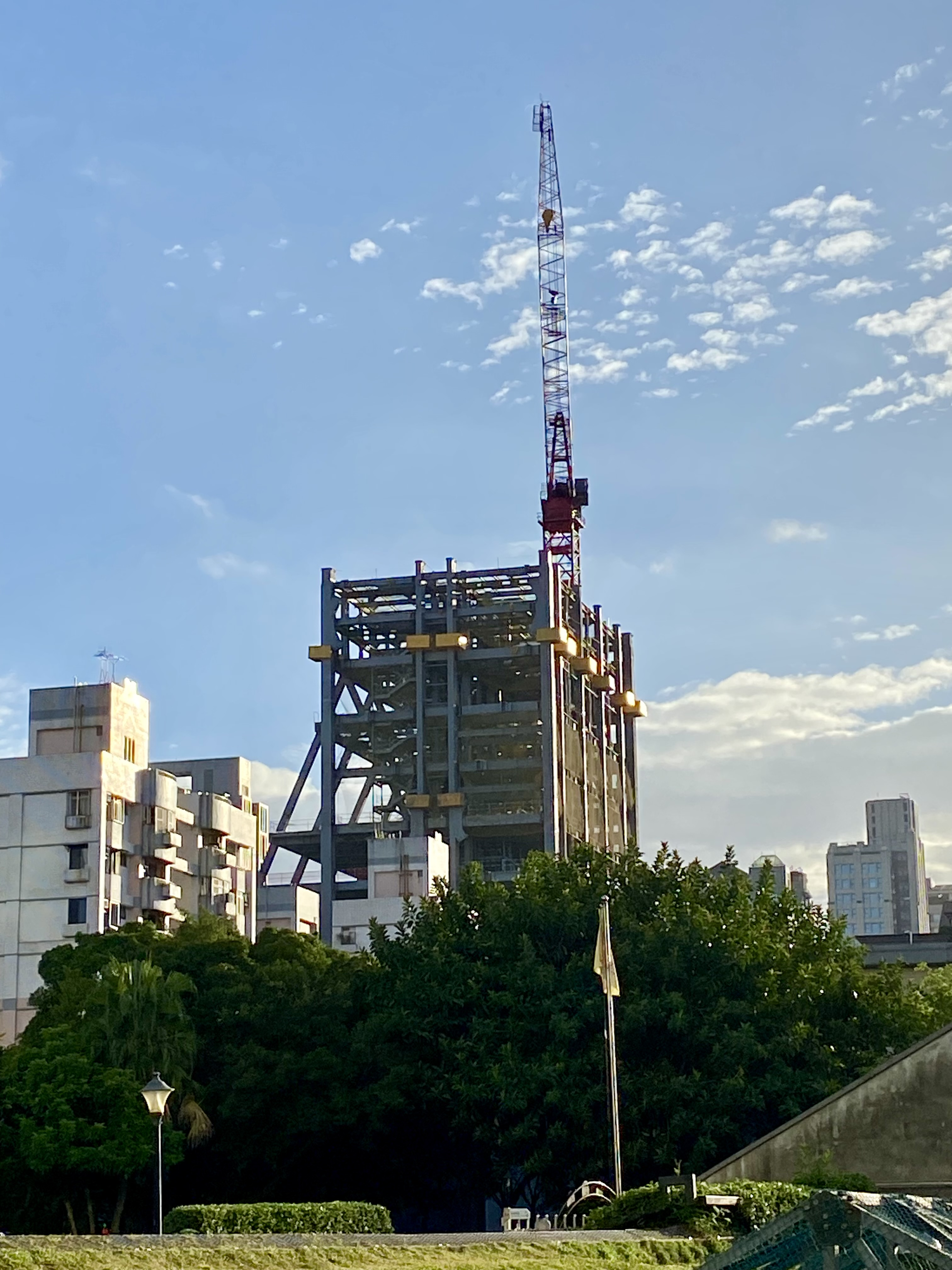
November 2023

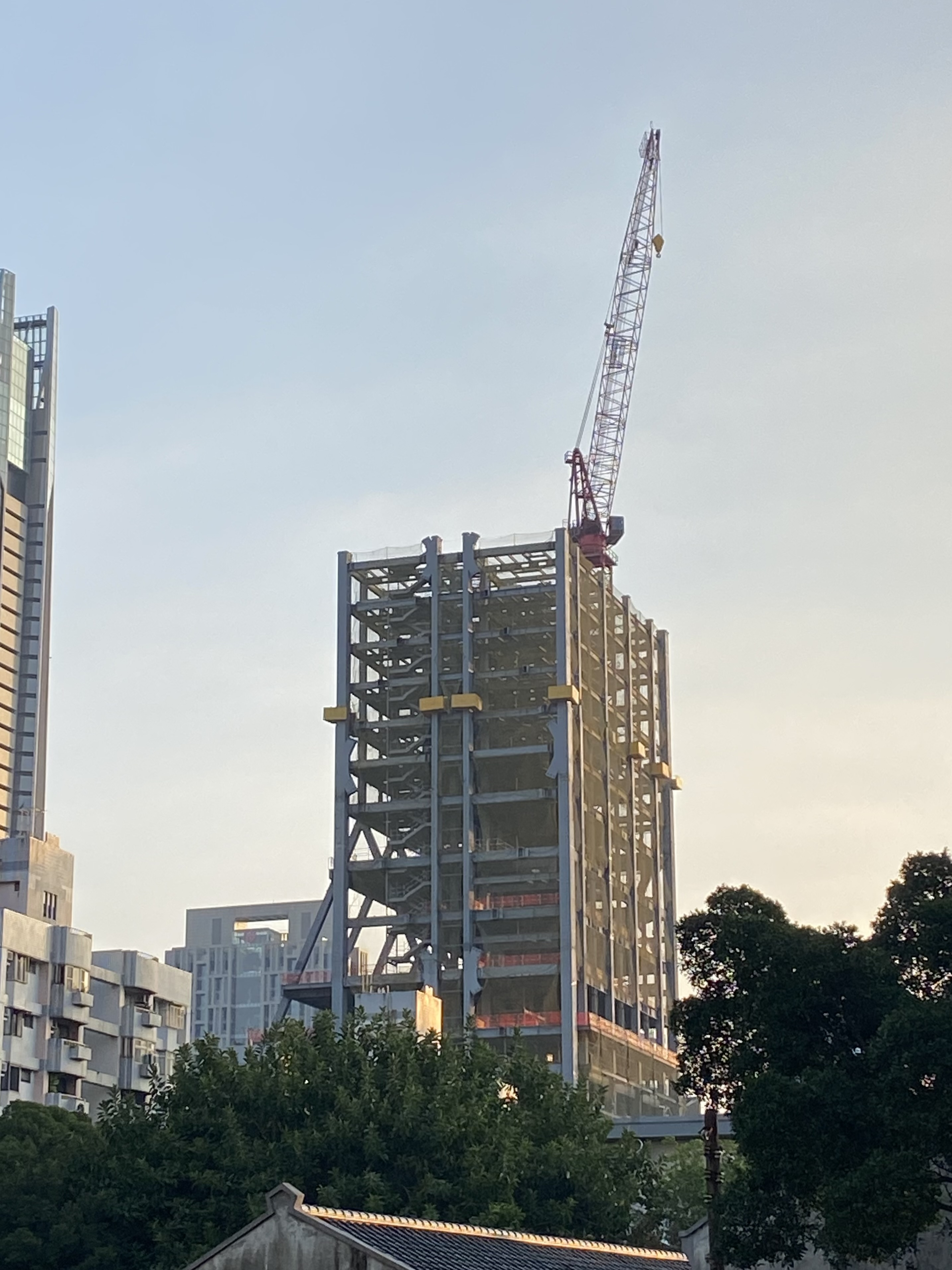
December 2023

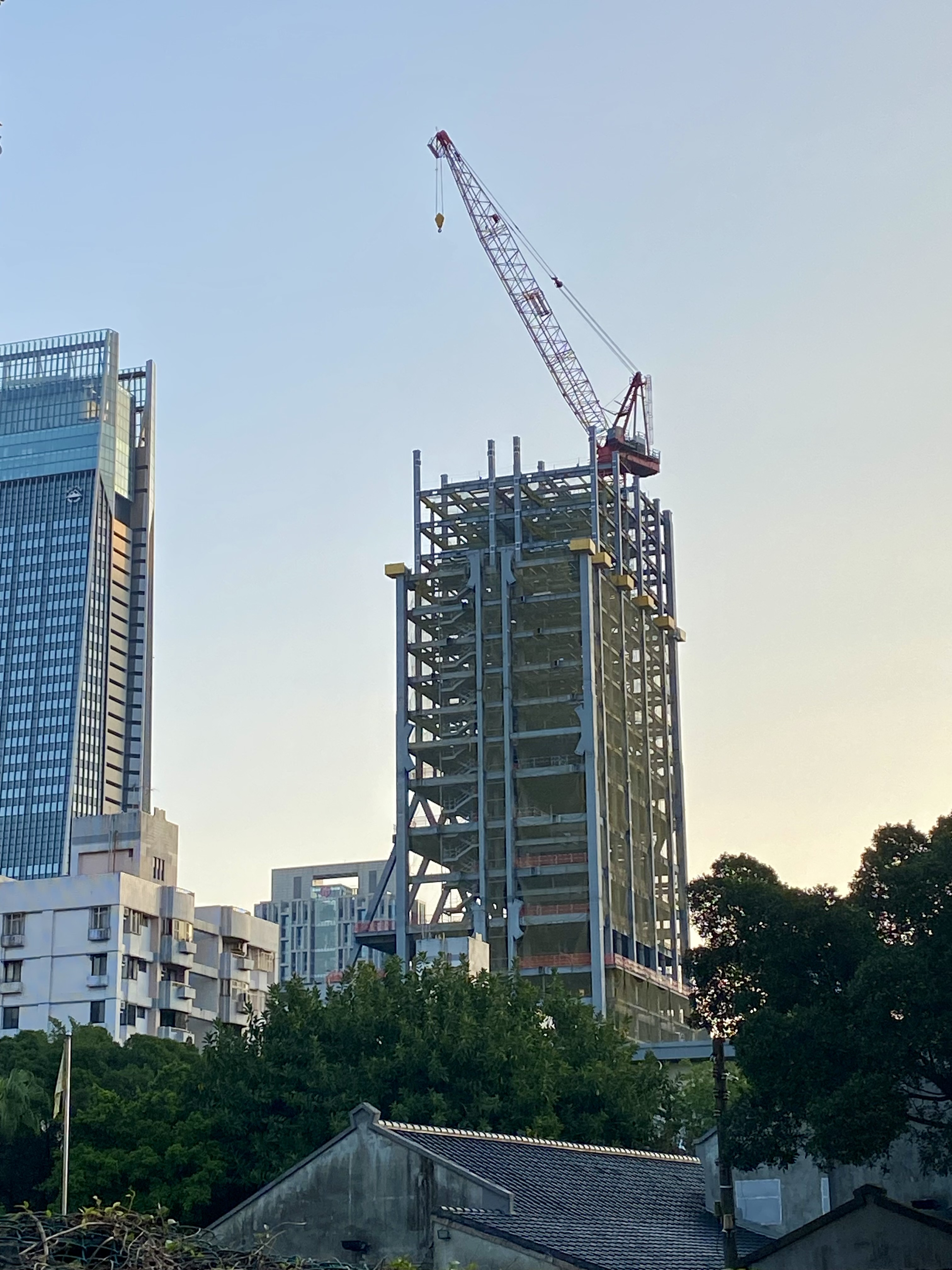
January 2024

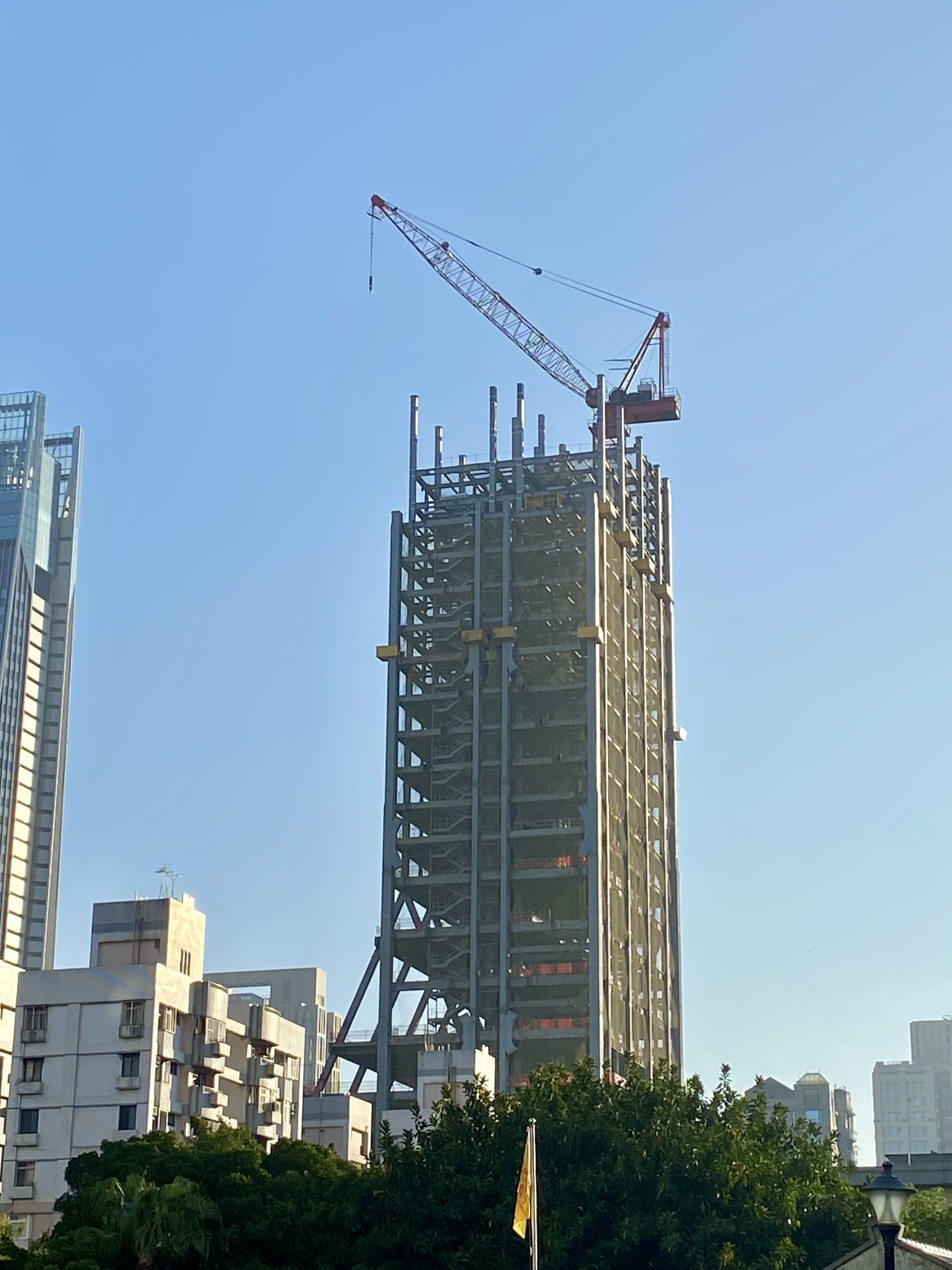
February 2024

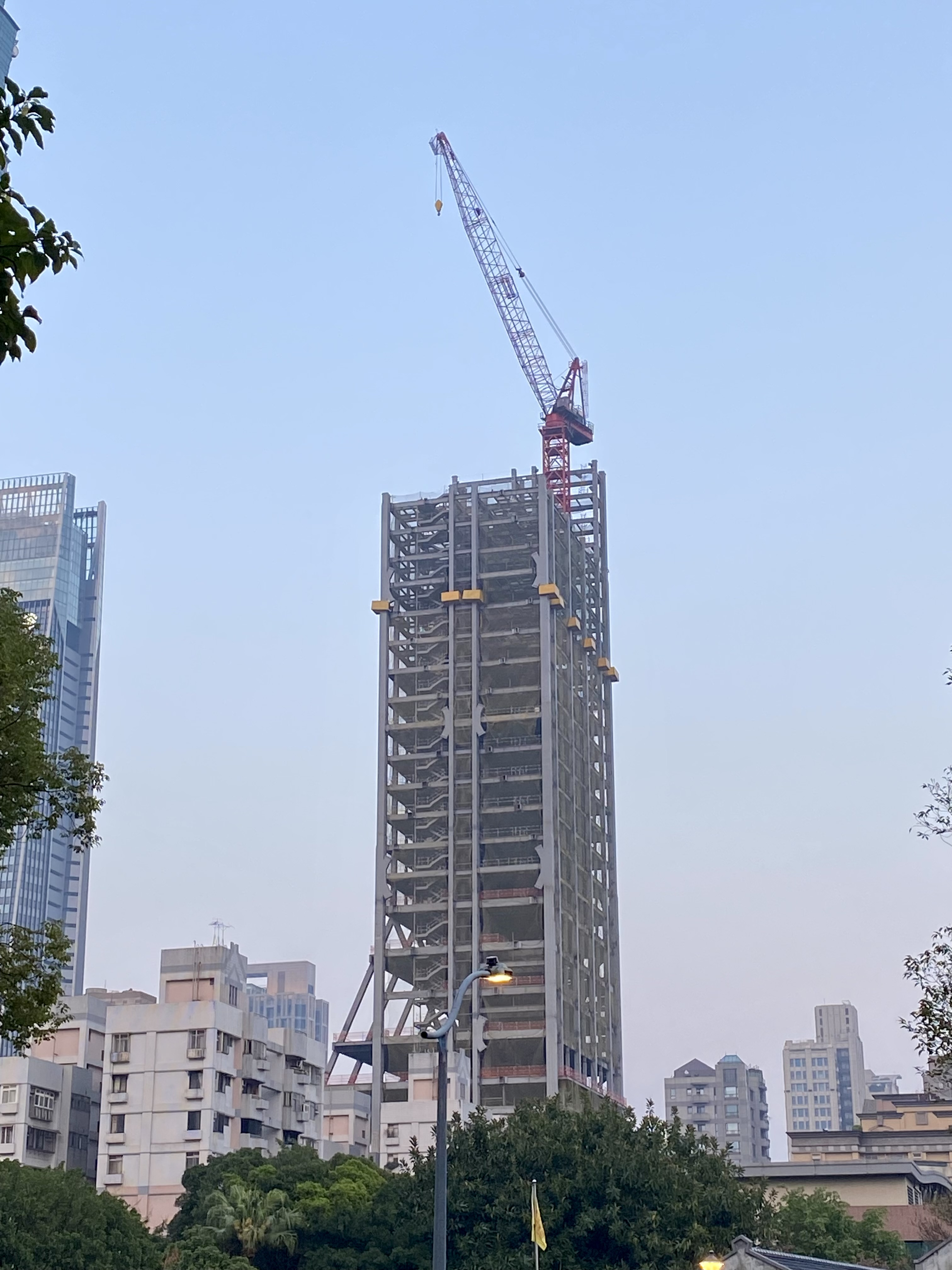
March 2024

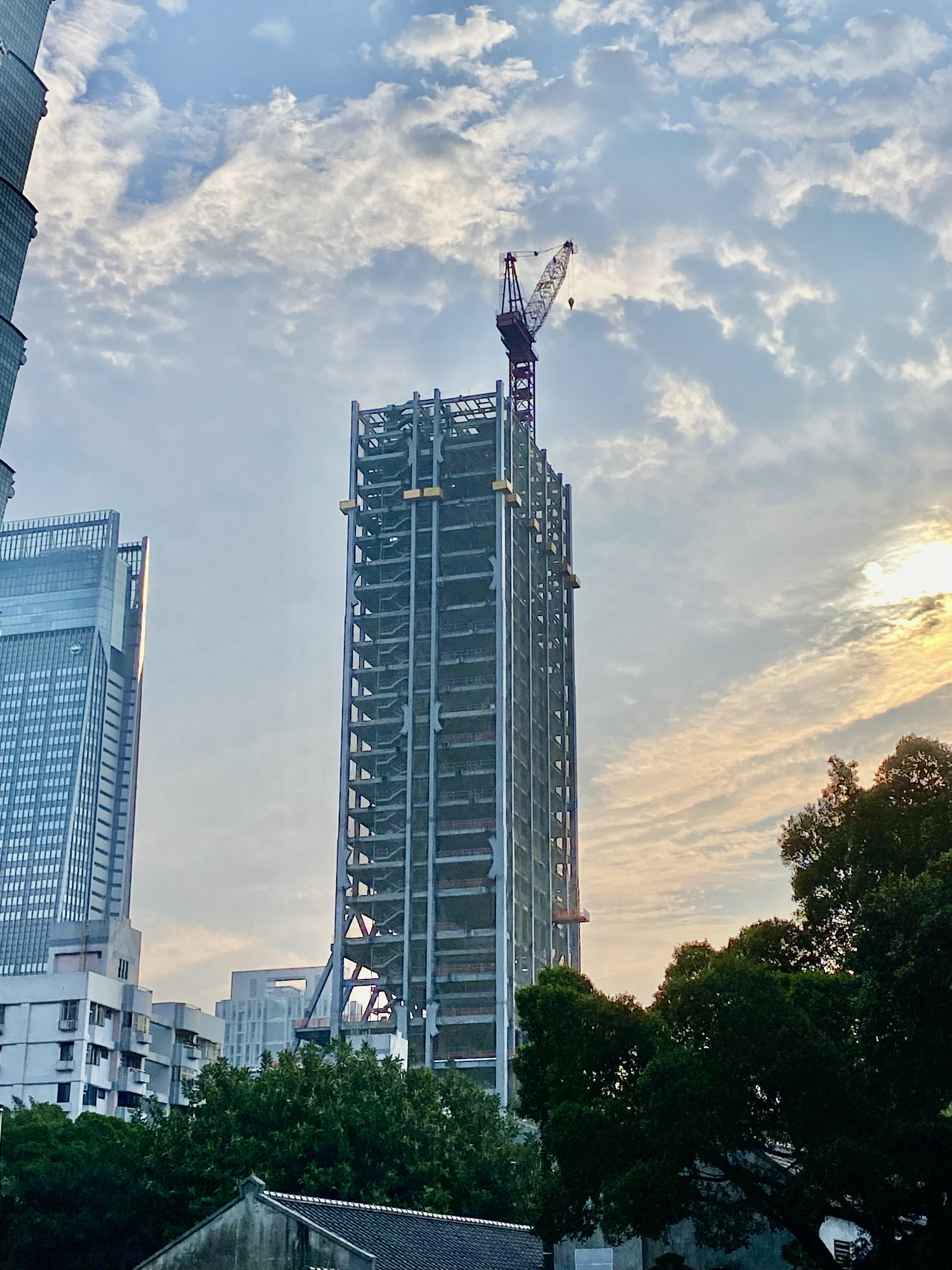
April 2024

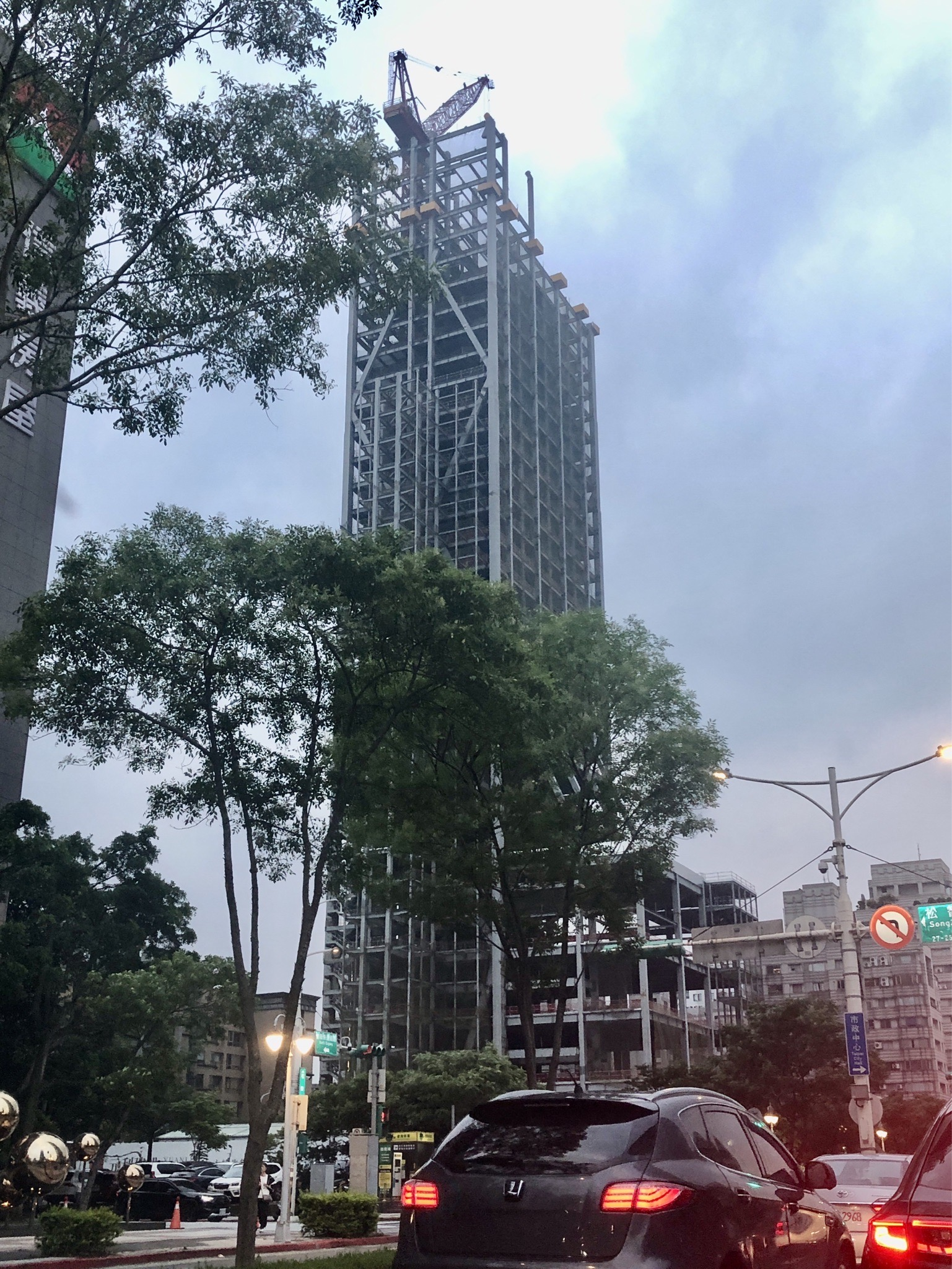
May 2024

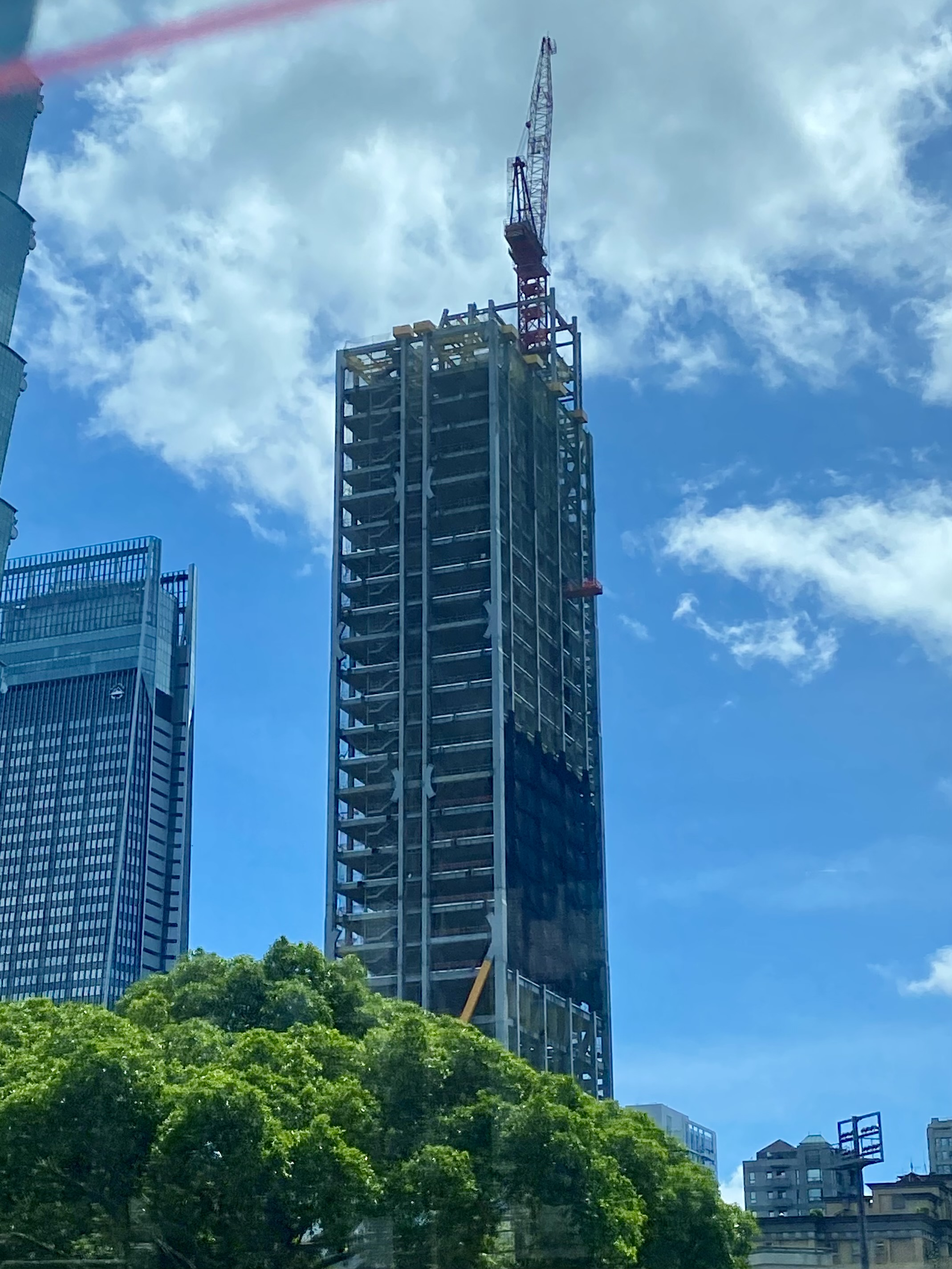
July 2024

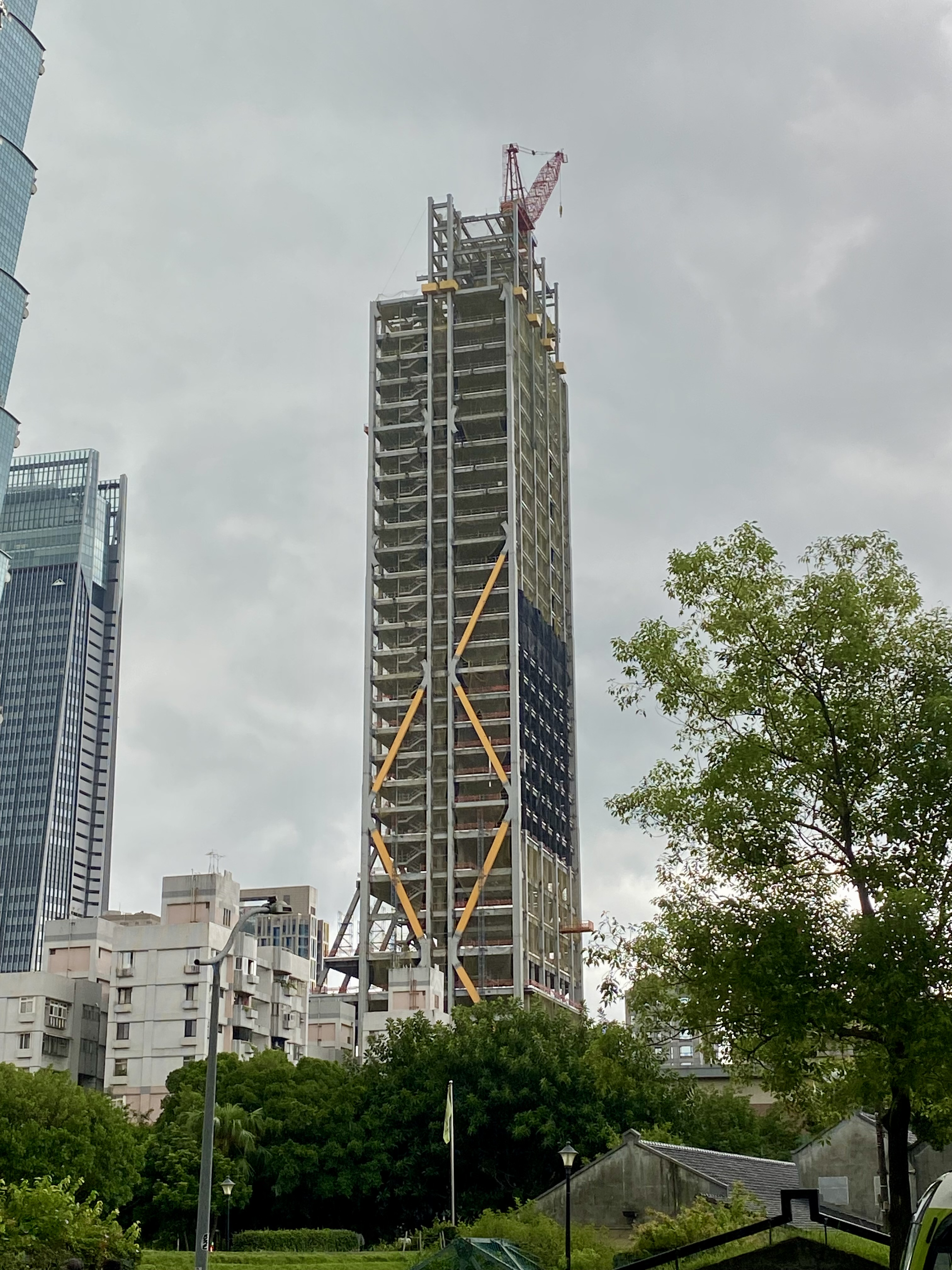
August 2024

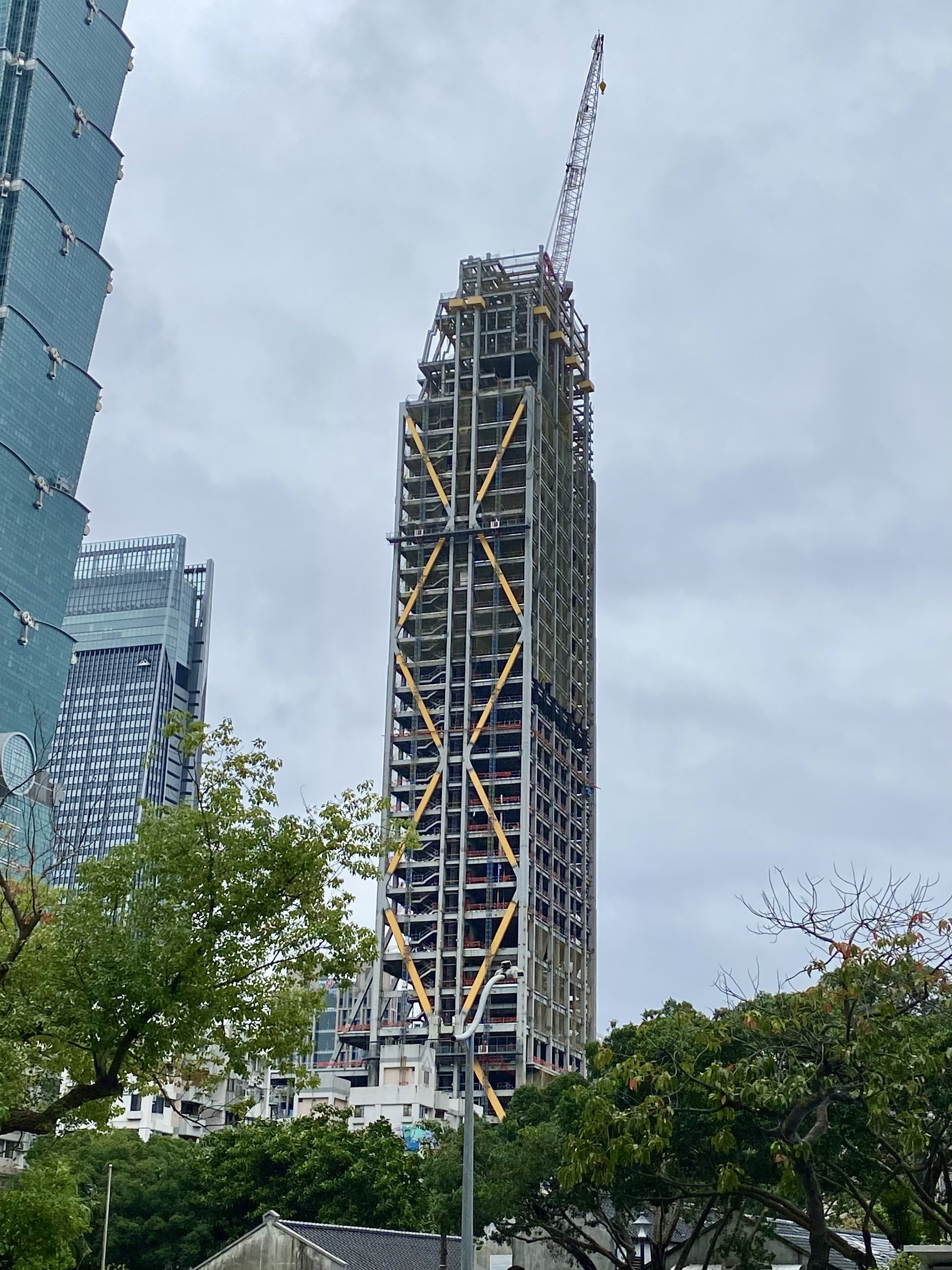
November 2024

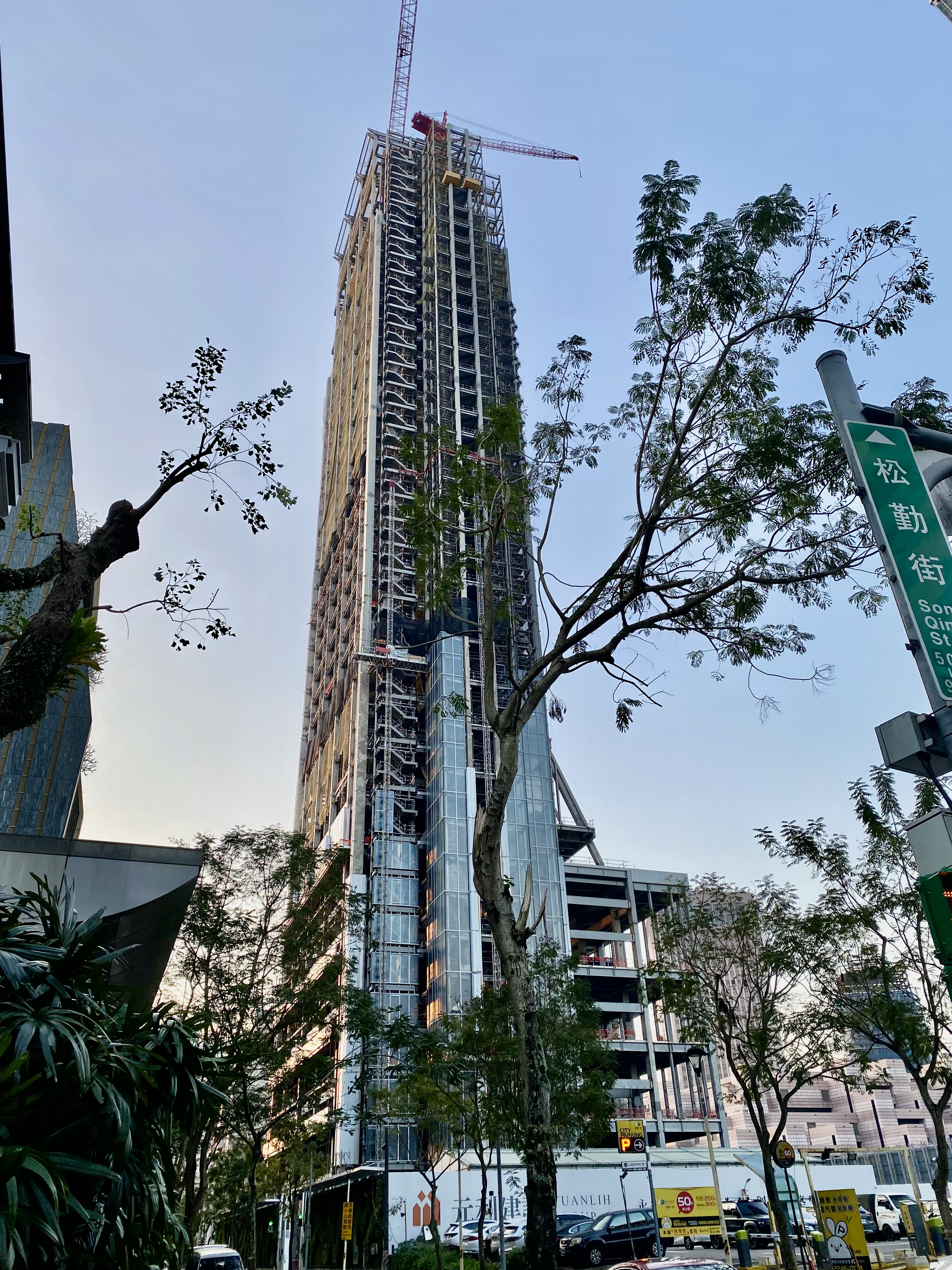
December 2024

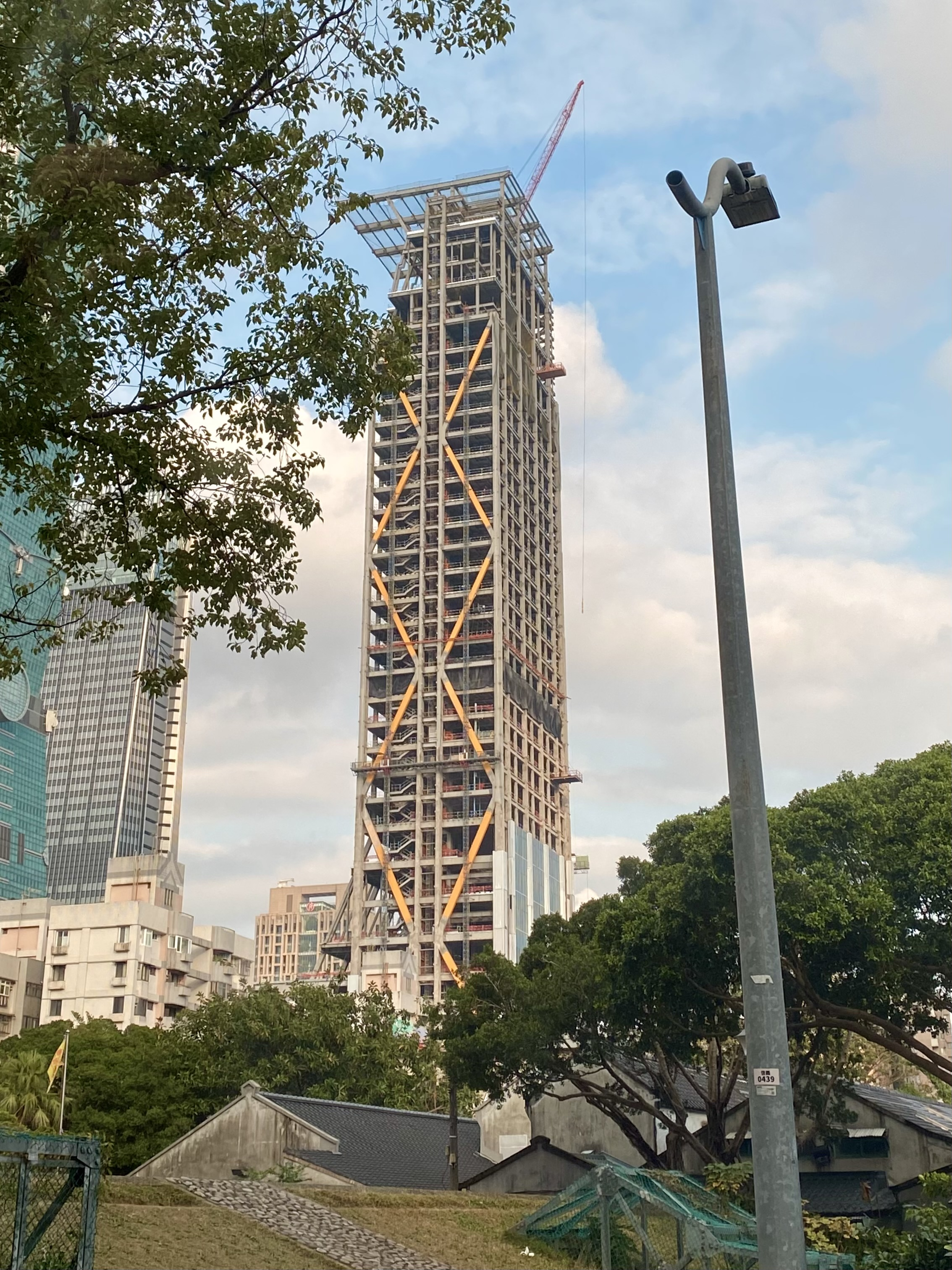
January 2025

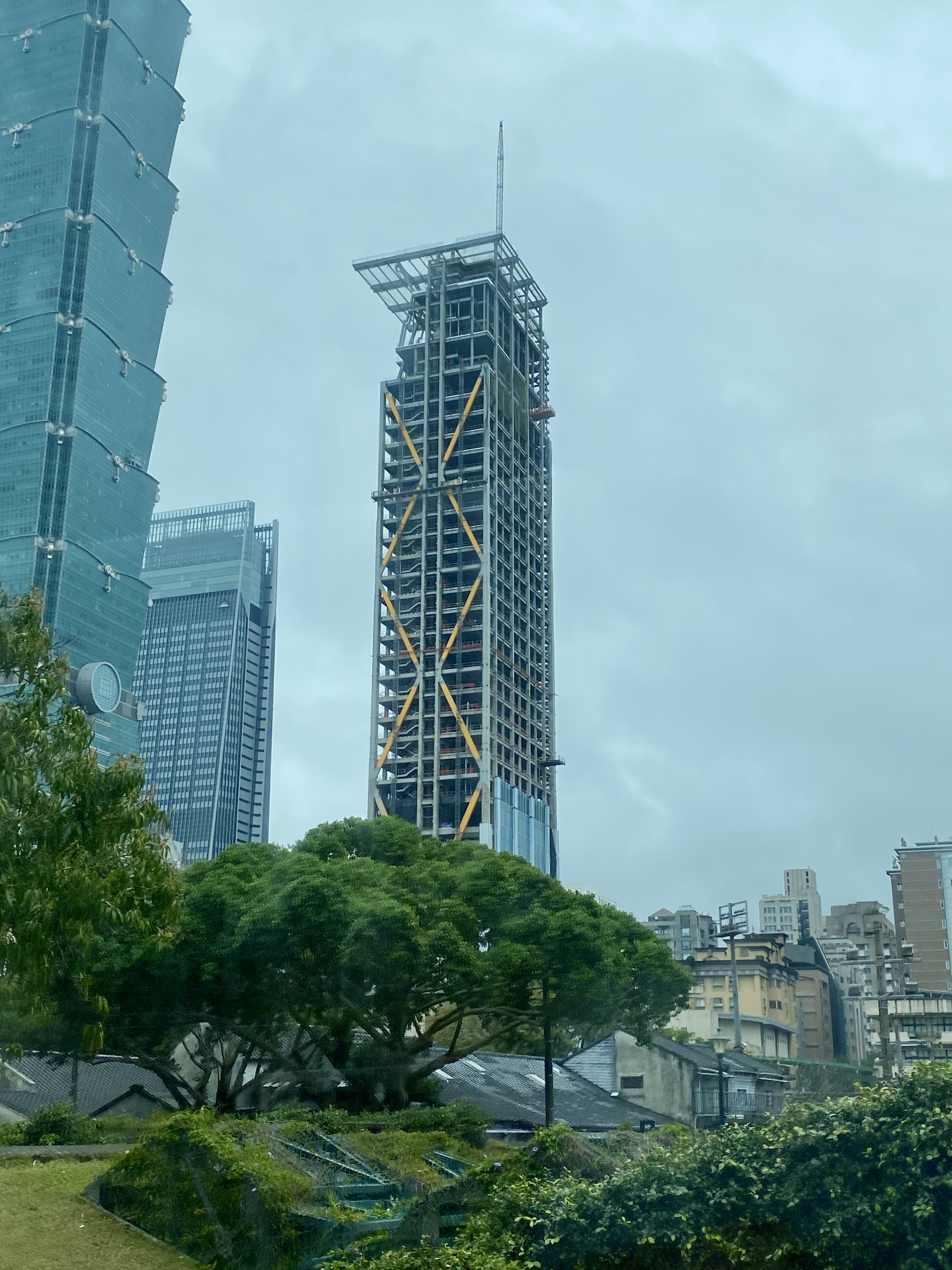
February 2025

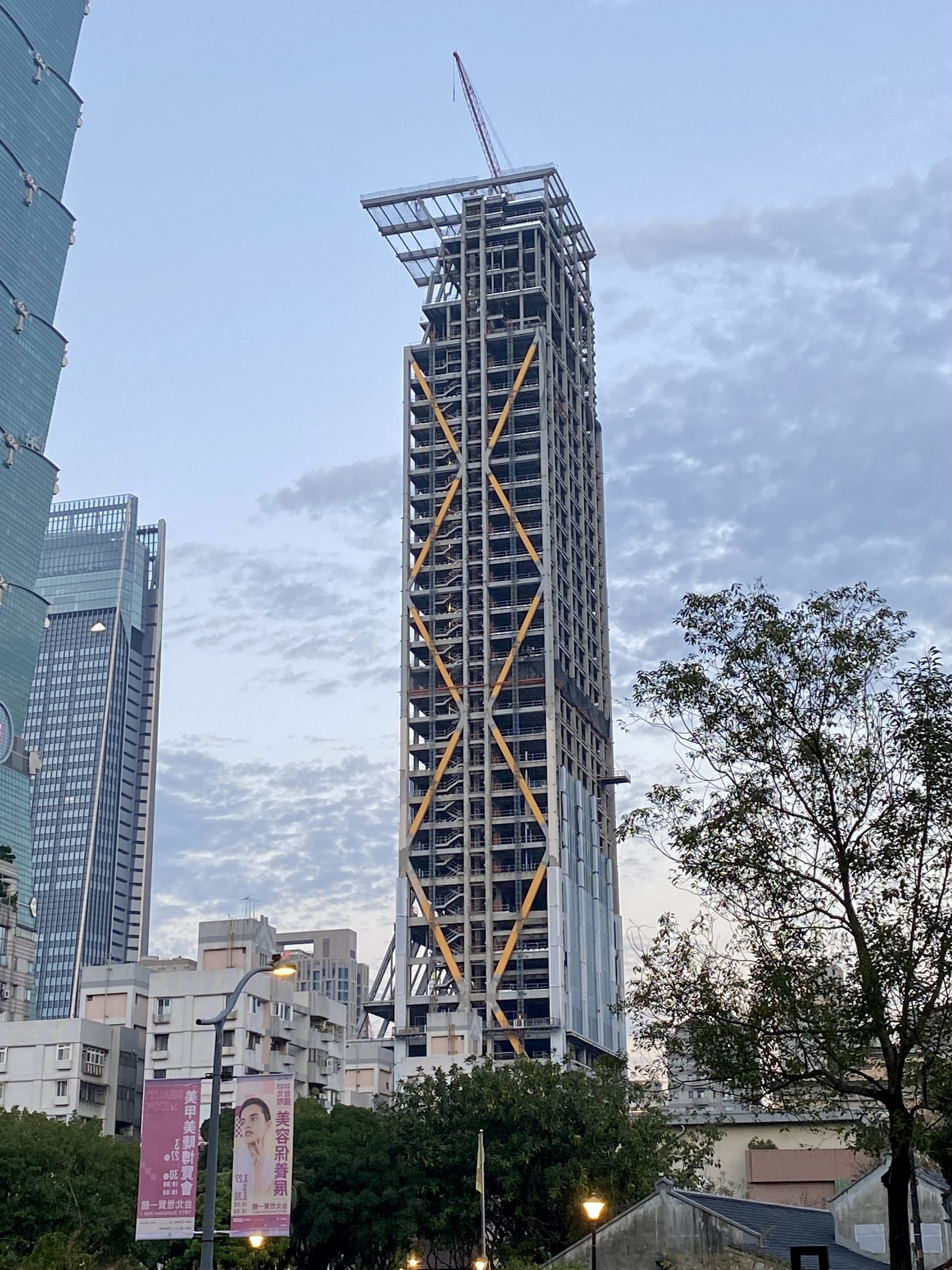
March 2025

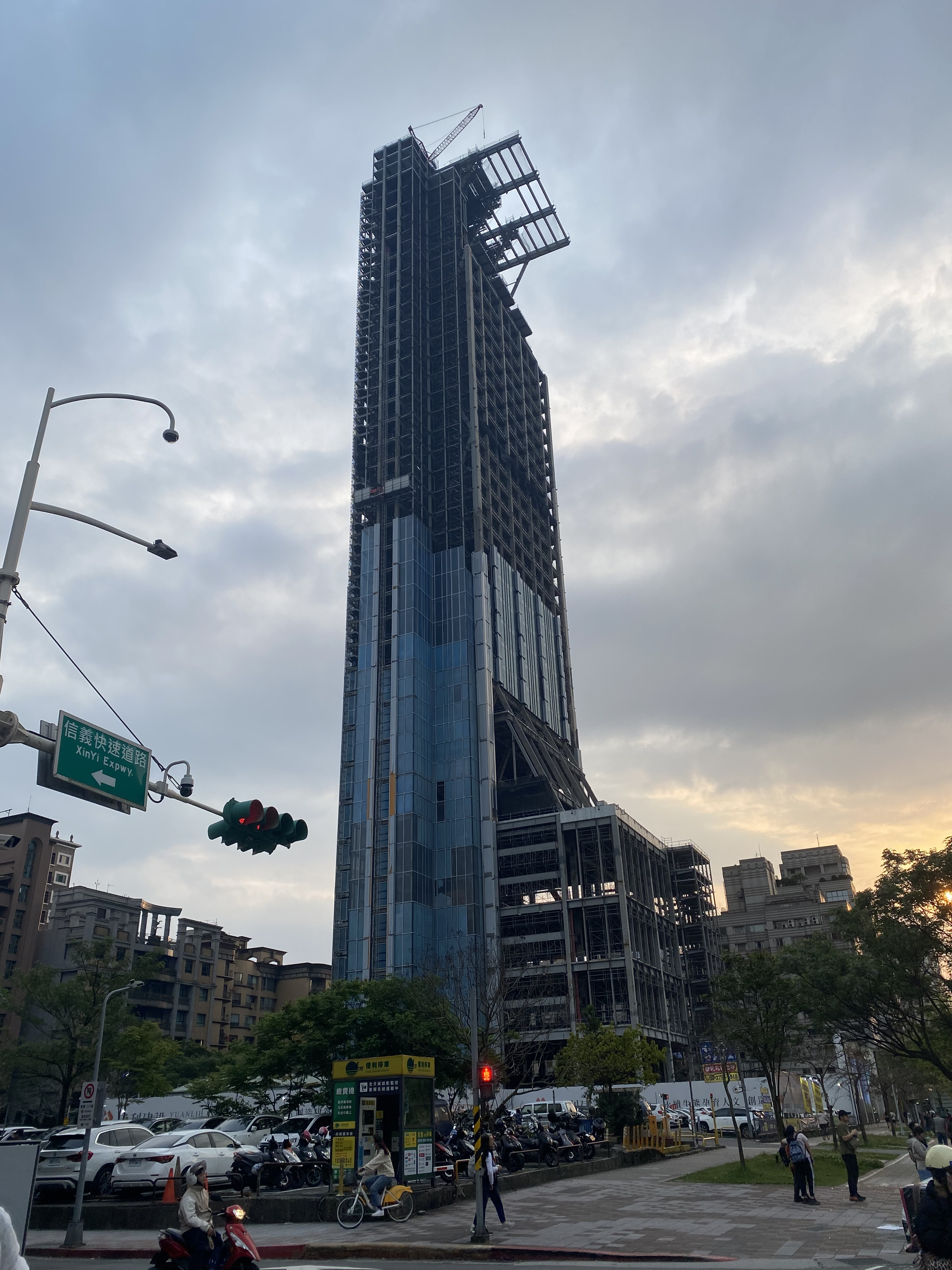
April 2025

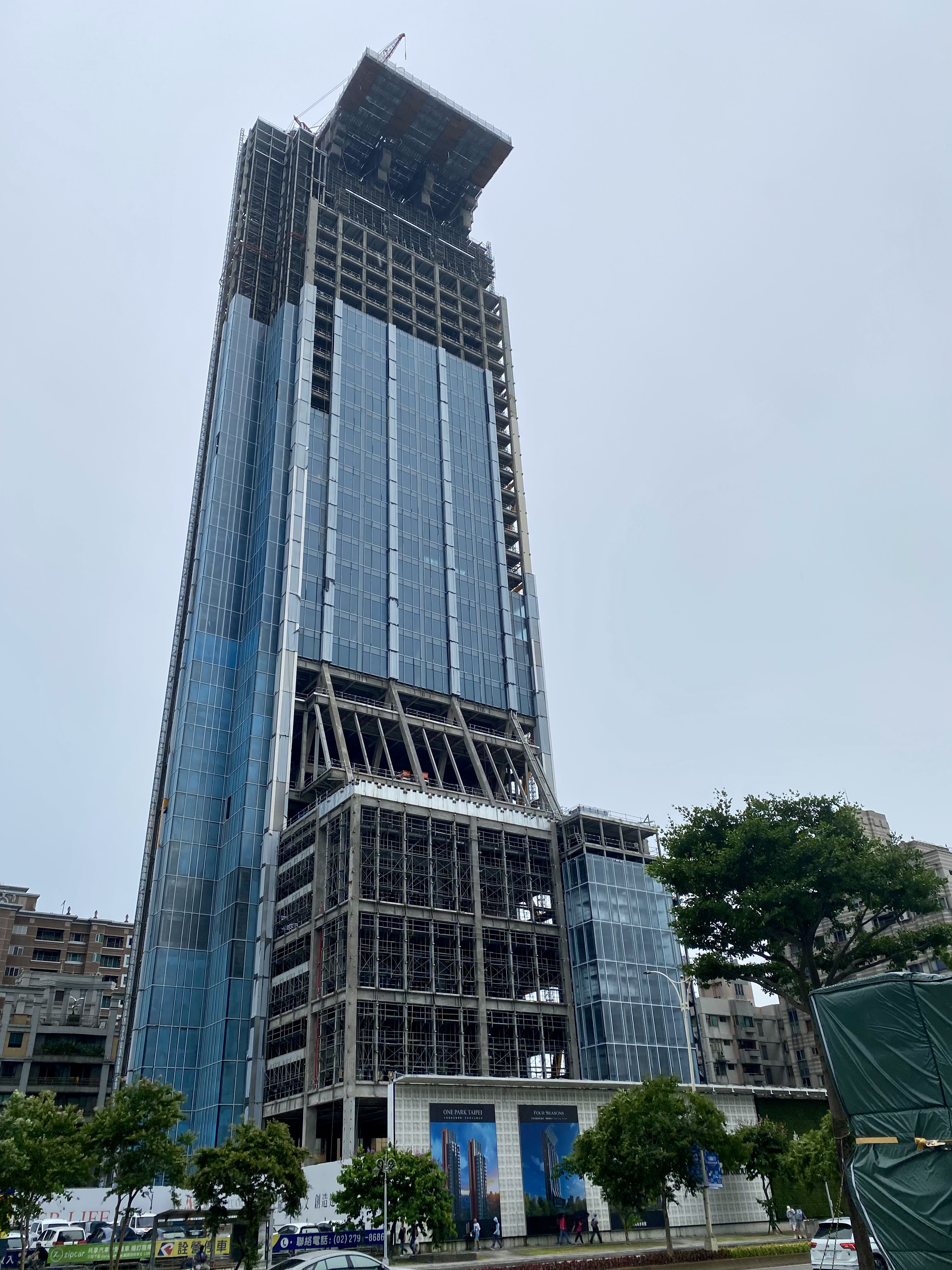
July 2025

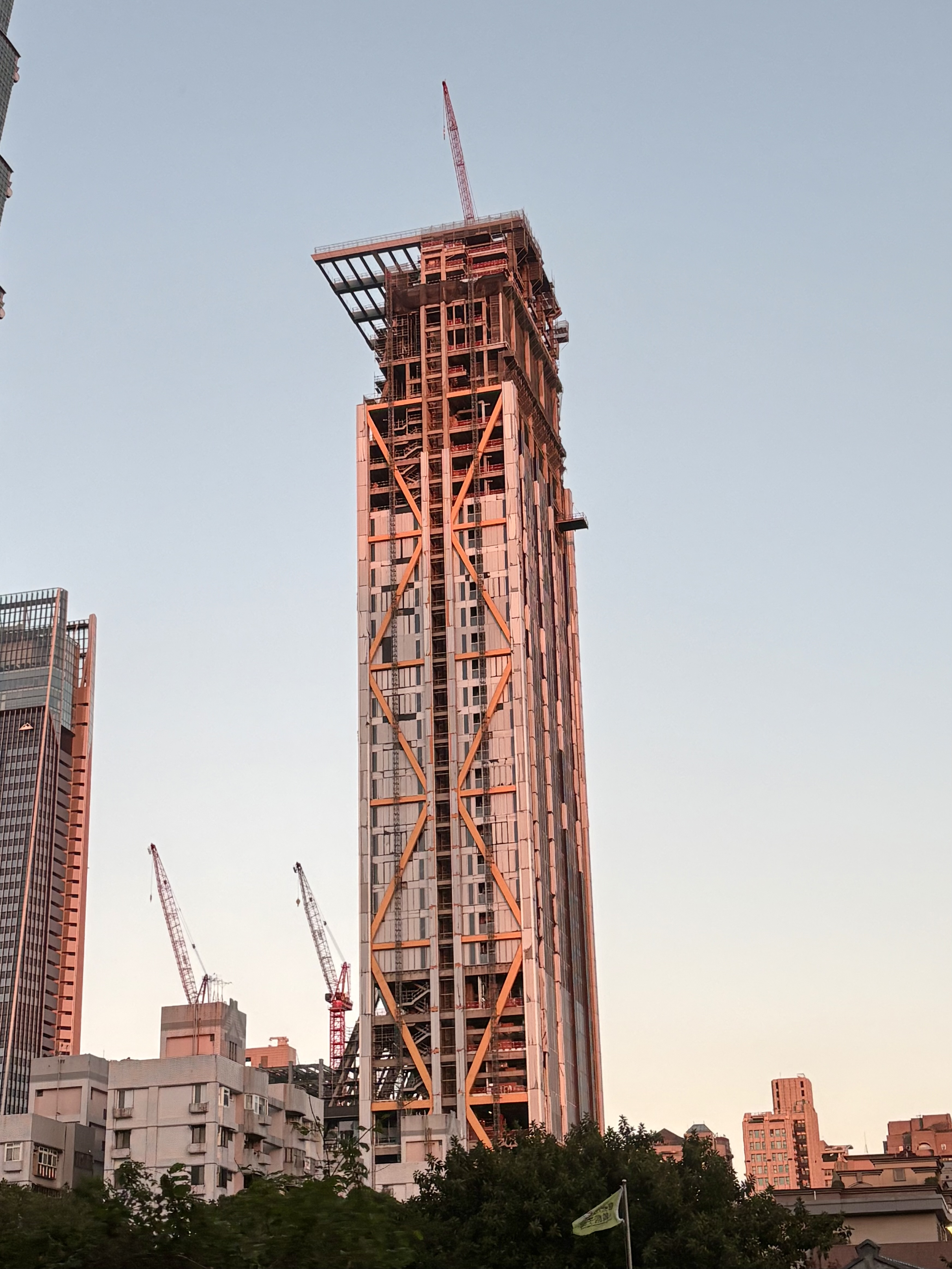
December 2025

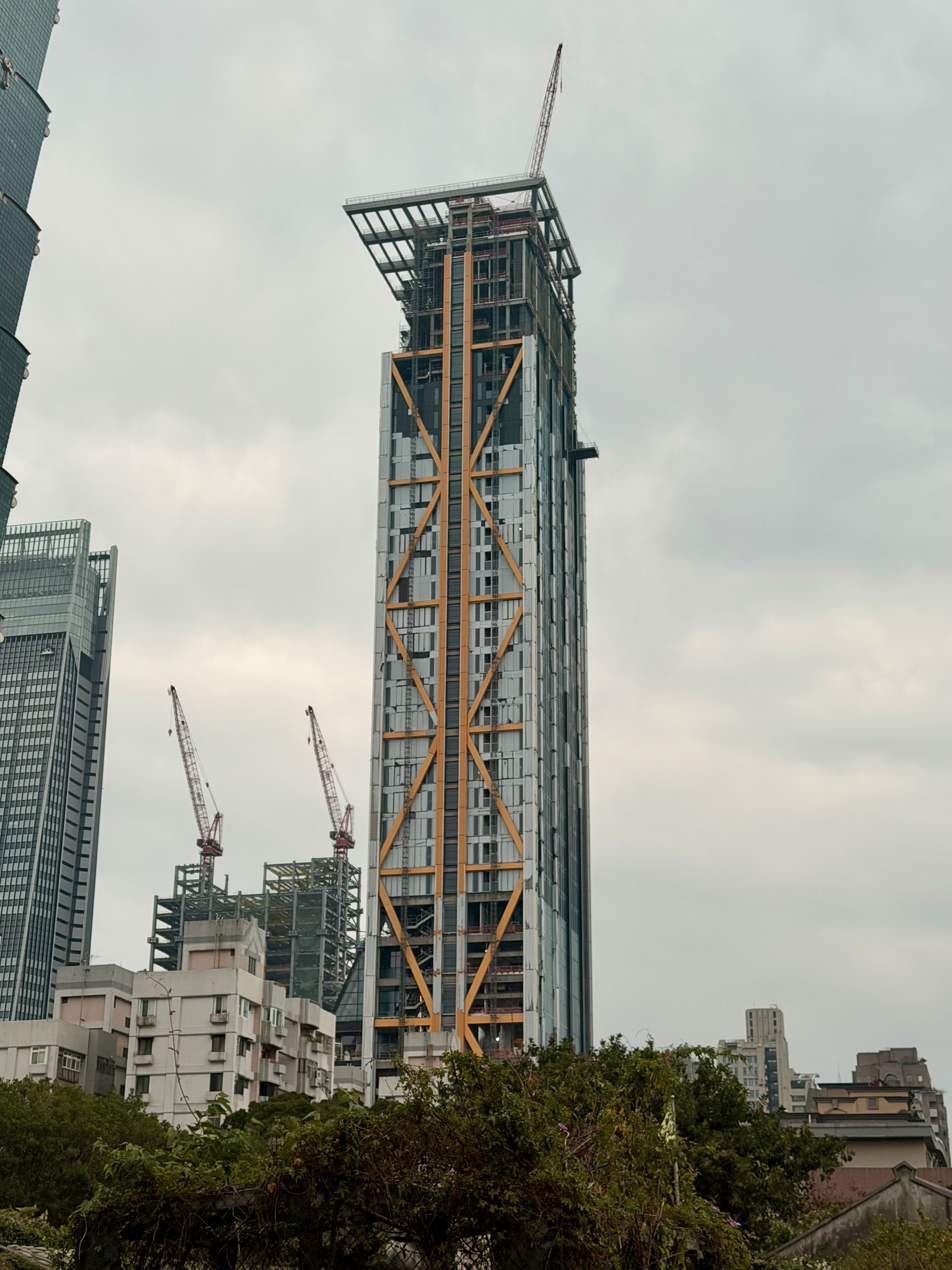
February 2026

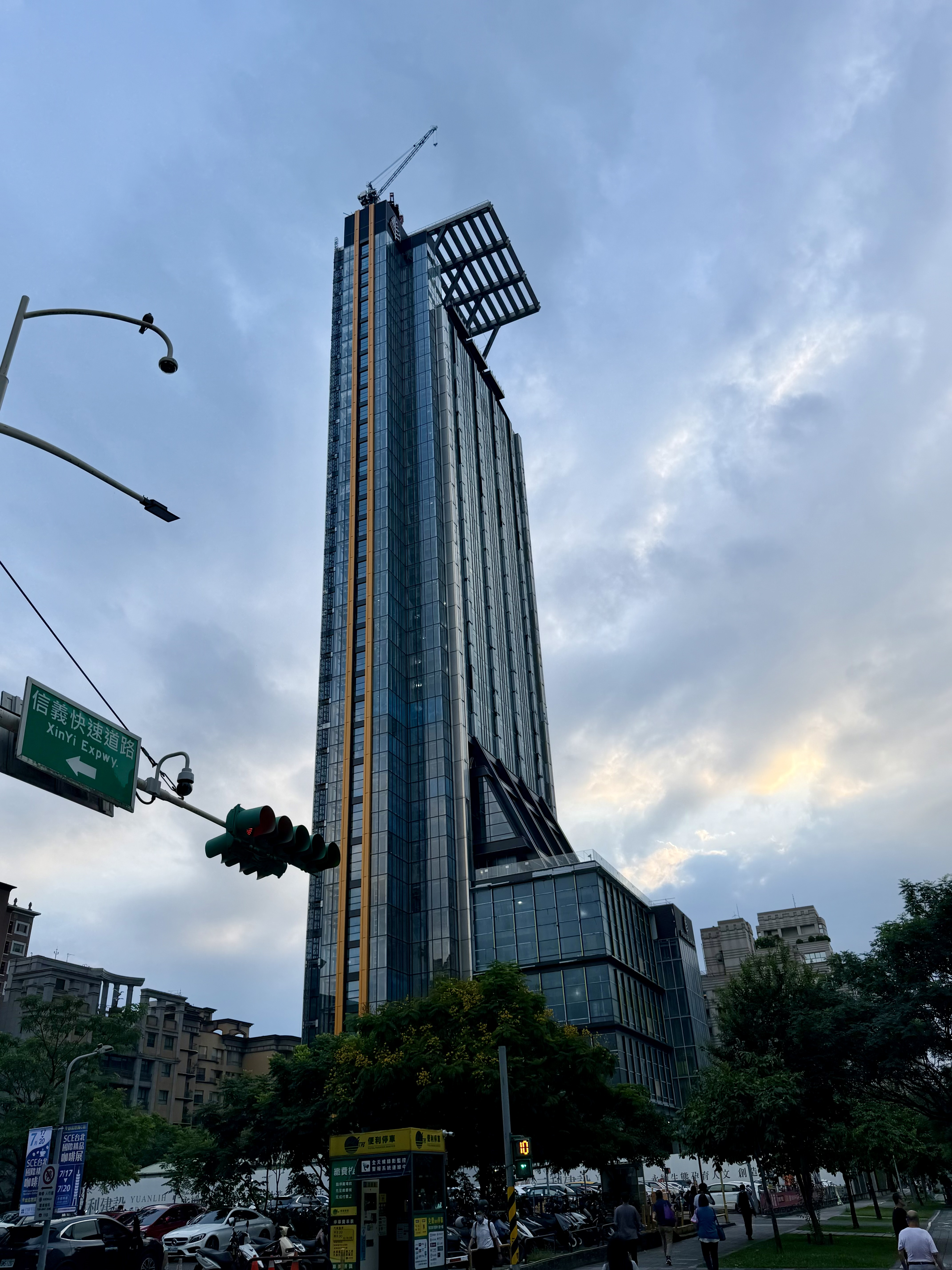
July 2026

== See also ==
- List of tallest buildings in Taiwan
- List of tallest buildings in Taipei
