= Stephen Burks (designer) =

American designer (born 1969)

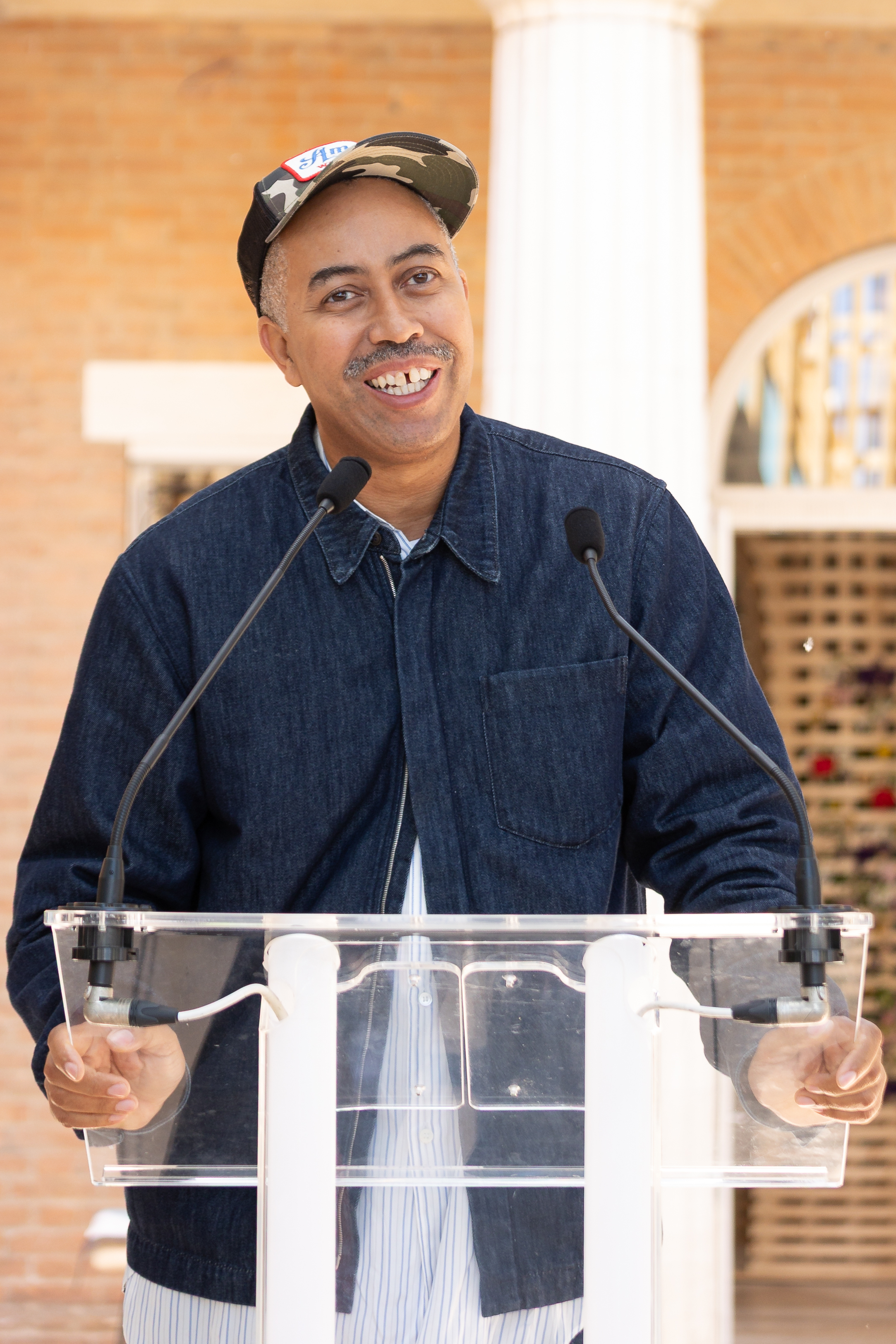
- Stephen Burks at Venice Architecture Biennale 2025
- Born: 1969 (age 56–57); Chicago
- Education: Illinois Institute of Technology; Columbia University
- Known for: Hand-crafted furniture and design objects
- Awards: National Design Award
- Website: Official website

Stephen Burks (born 1969) is an American designer and a professor of architecture at Columbia University. Burks is known for his collaborations with artisans as well as incorporating craft and weaving into product design. He is the first African American to win the National Design Award for product design.

== Early life and education ==
Burks was born in Chicago in 1969. He studied architecture and product design at the Illinois Institute of Technology and Columbia University Graduate School of Architecture.

== Career ==
Burks first founded his personal studio in New York in 1997, then called Readymade. His trademark style, which includes incorporating craftsmanship and collaborating with artisans began in 2000, when Italian design brand Cappellini first put his designs into production. in 2003, Missoni commissioned him for Luxe fashion house. Patchwork vases, designed by him, were the first handmade objects produced in his studio. He has worked with companies and brands such as Bolon, Calligaris, Dedon, Italian lighting manufacturer Luceplan, and the marble company Salvatori.

In 2005, Burks went to South Africa to collaborate with international artisans from countries such as South Africa, Senegal, and Philippines sponsored by Aid to Artisans. There he started working with hand-crafted furniture, baskets and fashion accessories which he became known for later in his career.

Burks started his own design business at 2007 after meeting with Willard Musarurwa; a street vendor making wire souvenirs for tourists. After meeting each other in a local design institute at Cape Town, they launched TaTu wire outdoor furniture together which focused on Hand-crafted-style designed furniture and Artisan objects.

Burks held his eponymous solo exhibition in 2011, called "Stephen Burks: Man Made" at the Studio Museum in Harlem, where he exhibited his practice of merging craftsmanship and contemporary design. The exhibition included his work produced with artisans from countries such as South Africa, Senegal, and Peru.

In 2015, Burks won the Cooper Hewitt National Design Award for product design, the first . In 2019, Stephen became the first product designer to attain a Harvard Loeb Fellowship. Since, he has served as an expert in residence at the Harvard Innovation Lab. He also taught at Harvard Graduate School of Design.

His work is in the collections of the Cooper Hewitt, Smithsonian Design Museum, the High Museum of Art, National Museum of African American History and Culture, Philadelphia Museum of Art, Vitra Design Museum, Victoria and Albert Museum, as well as Corning Museum of Glass. His work is the subject of a touring exhibition titled, "Stephen Burks: Shelter in Place" which debuted at the High Museum of Art in 2022.

In 2023 an exhibition at the Milan design fair (in which Burks was not a participant) attracted criticism after Burks and Jenny Nguyen pointed out that the pieces displayed lacked curatorial explanation of historical context, and were overtly racist stereotypical portrayals of people of non-European descent, stating: "It's really a question of how homogenous cultures like Italy marginalize people of non-European descent." The resulting controversy led to a public apology from the organisers of the event.

== Style ==
Burks is known for directly working with handcraft artisans such as basket weavers, and incorporating craft into his work. Burks describes his mission as "bringing the hand to industry."

== Exhibitions ==
- 2011 Stephen Burks: Man Made, Studio Museum in Harlem
- 2022 Stephen Burks: Shelter in Place, High Museum, Atlanta (touring exhibition)
- 2023 Stephen Burks: Spirit Houses, Volume Gallery, Chicago
- 2024 The New Transcendence, Friedman Benda Gallery, New York (group show also featuring works by Ini Archibong, Andrea Branzi, Najla El Zein, Courtney Leonard, and Samuel Ross)

== Awards and honors ==
- Illinois Institute of Technology Alumni Professional Achievement Award
- Brooklyn Museum Modernism Young Designer Award
- Smithsonian Cooper Hewitt National Design Award in Product Design (2015)
- Architektur and Wohnen Audi Mentor Prize
- 2008 United States Artists Target Fellowship
- Harvard Loeb Fellowship (2019)

== Publications ==
- Gwinn, Elizabeth; Hayes, Lauren (2011). Stephen Burks: Man Made. The Studio Museum in Harlem. ISBN 9780942949155
- Obniski, Monica (2022). Stephen Burks Shelter in Place. Yale University Press. ISBN 9780300270853
