= Christina Kim (disambiguation) =

Christina Kim is an American golfer.

Christina Kim may also refer to:

- Christina M. Kim, American television writer
- Christina Kim (designer), American designer, artist, and founder of dosa

== See also ==
- Kristina Kim (born 1989), Russian taekwondo practitioner
