= Prem Ganapathy =

Indian entrepreneur and businessman (born 1973)

- Born: 1973 (age 52–53); Thoothukudi district, Tamil Nadu, India
- Occupation: Founder of Dosa plaza

Prem Ganapathy is an Indian entrepreneur and businessman. He is the founder of the restaurant chain Dosa plaza. Starting with meager investment, he expanded Dosa plaza into a restaurant chain with 72 outlets in India, New Zealand, Oman, and UAE.

== Early life ==
Ganapathy was born in Nagalapuram in Thoothukudi district in the state of Tamil Nadu. He had seven siblings. Ganapathy completed class X after which he left for Madras (now Chennai) in search of a job. He did multiple jobs in Chennai before running away to Bombay (now Mumbai) in 1990. Ganapathy was stranded in Bombay with no money and no knowledge of the local language. He started working in a bakery with the help of a Tamil family.

== Career ==
In 1992, Ganapathy started his own food business, selling idlis and dosas in a handcart opposite the Vashi railway station. In 1997, he rented a shop and started experimenting with various varieties of dosas. In 2003, he opened his first outlet in a mall in Center One Mall at Vashi. As of 2012, Dosa plaza has 45 outlets in 4 countries serving more than 100 varieties of dosas.
