= Salvatori (design) =

Italian design company and marble supplier

- Company type: Private
- Industry: Stone industry
- Founded: 1946
- Founder: Guido Salvatori
- Headquarters: Querceta, Tuscany, Italy
- Area served: Worldwide
- Key people: Gabriele Salvatori (CEO)
- Website: salvatori.it

Salvatori is an Italian design brand specialising in natural stone such as marble, limestone and sandstone.

== History ==
Salvatori was founded in 1946 in Querceta, Tuscany, close to the Carrara marble quarries. In 1950 the founder Guido Salvatori invented the “split face” finish, whereby the stone is opened up to expose the textured surface within. In the early 2000s in addition to textures the company started to also produce bathroom items such as bathtubs and basins. More recently the company has introduced its Home Collection, which began with tables and later extended into areas such as lighting, storage solutions and accessories, in order to widen its appeal.

In 2010 Salvatori invented Lithoverde, the world's first material almost solely made from recycled natural stone. Lithoverde is 99% composed of offcuts of marble (Bianco Carrara or Gris du Marais) or limestone (Crema d’Orcia or Pietra d’Avola) which are bound together by a natural resin (the remaining 1%). It debuted internationally at Salone del Mobile in Milan when John Pawson created the installation The House of Stone made entirely of Lithoverde®.

Currently it is run by CEO Gabriele Salvatori, grandson of the company's founder.

== Projects ==
Salvatori has supplied product for projects ranging from residential to retail to hospitality such as ETH Zurich (University of Science and Technology), Armani Hotel Milan, Armani stores globally, the Conservatorium Hotel Amsterdam, Salvatore Ferragamo and Donna Karan. In 2013 Salvatori collaborated with Jaguar to create the F-Table for the Wallpaper* Handmade special exhibition, on display in the main window of Harrod's. The exhibition also travelled to Milan and New York in 2014.

== Designers ==
In 2010 the company worked with John Pawson on The House of Stone using Salvatori's Lithoverde. In 2014 Kengo Kuma developed Ishiburo, a bathroom range in natural stone, with Salvatori. In 2017 a series of tables were created in a joint collaboration with Michael Anastassiades. Salvatori has also worked with Daniel Libeskind on residential projects in Italy and Piero Lissoni on a table range, stone texture and several hospitality projects including Roomers Hotel in Baden Baden. Other designers who have worked with the company include Michael Anastassiades, Stephen Burks, Rodolfo Dordoni, Luca Nichetto, Patricia Urquiola, Vincent Van Duysen, and Yabu Pushelberg.

== Locations ==
The company has a showroom in the Brera district of Milan. In 2013 they opened a space in Zurich and in 2016 the company opened flagship showrooms in London’s Wigmore Street and Sydney.

== Awards ==
- 2013: presented with the Premio di Premi (Award of all Awards). Initiated by the Italian government.
- 2013: Wallpaper* magazine named Salvatori's limited edition piece Girella as winner of Best Domestic Design.
- 2014: Salvatori received an Honourable Mention at the Compasso d’Oro awards.
