= Piero Lissoni =

Italian architect and designer

Piero Lissoni (born July 23, 1956, in Seregno) is an Italian architect, art director and designer. For over thirty years, he has developed projects the world over in the fields of architecture, landscape and interior, as well as in product and graphic design. He is also art director for Alpi, B&B Italia, Boffi, Living Divani, Lema, Lualdi, Porro and Sanlorenzo.

In 1986, Lissoni, alongside Nicoletta Canesi, founded the studio Lissoni & Partners in Milan, Italy, focusing on architecture as well as interior and product design. In 1996, Lissoni Graphx, the agency for visual communication, directed by Piero Lissoni's brother Massimo Lissoni, was added to the company. Graphx specializes in brand identity, including catalogs, advertising campaigns, videos, web design, and packaging. They were in charge of the visual coordination of the Venice International Film Festival, organized by La Biennale di Venezia from 2007 until 2016.

Lissoni Architettura was established in 2013, to take charge of numerous international architectural clients. In 2015, Lissoni Inc. was created in New York, where interior design for the American, Canadian, and Central and South American markets were developed. In 2023, the New York office expanded its services with a new studio dedicated to architecture.

== Work ==
Piero Lissoni is the art director for Alpi, B&B Italia, Boffi, Living Divani, Lema, Lualdi, Porro and Sanlorenzo; he designs products and exhibition stands for many of the above brands and other companies including Alessi, Audi, Bonacina 1889, Cappellini, Cassina, Cotto, Fantini, Gallo, Glas Italia, Golran, Illy, Kartell, Kerakoll Design House, Knoll International, Olivari, Salvatori, Serapian, Tecno, Viccarbe, Wella. Starting out with kitchen and bathroom designs at Boffi Kitchens in the mid-1980s, Lissoni later established his own architectural firm in Milan. The setup called "Lissoni Associati" still continues to produce architectural work, now under the name Lissoni & Partners.

== Awards ==
2005 – Hall of Fame, I.D. Magazine International Design Award – USA

2014 – Winner "XXIII Compasso d'Oro", ADI/Association for Industrial Design – L16 – Lualdi

2014 – Winner "Meilleure architecture intérieure d’hôtel en Europe", Prix Villégiature 2014 – Conservatorium Hotel/Amsterdam

2016 – Winner "NYC Aquarium & Public Waterfront" open ideas competition Arch Out Loud/ New York USA

2016 – Winner "Meilleur hotel du Moyen Orient", Prix Villégiature 2016 – Mamilla Hotel/Jerusalem

2017 – Winner "Best Sleepover" Wallpaper* Design Awards – Extrasoft bed/ Living Divani

2022 — Winner "Hotel Conversion," "Lobby and Public Spaces" AHEAD Global Awards - Shangri-La Shougang Park, Beijing

2023 — Winner "Outstanding Contribution" AHEAD Europe

2024 — Compasso d'Oro alla Carriera ('for career achievement').
