= Courtney M. Leonard =

Native American artist and filmmaker

- Born: 1980; Long Island, New York
- Education: Institute of American Indian Arts; Alfred University's NY College of Ceramics; Rhode Island School of Design
- Occupations: Multimedia artist, filmmaker
- Notable work: BREACH
- Website: courtneymleonard.com

Courtney M. Leonard (born 1980) is a multimedia artist, filmmaker, and activist from the Shinnecock Nation in Long Island, New York. Her work revolves around issues of ecology and Native identity, specifically their intersection with water, which is essential to the Shinnecock. Leonard primarily uses clay and her ceramic artwork has been inspired by the whaling coastal culture of the Shinnecock Nation. She has contributed to the Offshore Art Movement and now focuses on her work, BREACH, which is centered on environmental sustainability.

== Biography ==
Courtney Leonard was born in 1980 in Long Island, New York. She is a member of the Shinnecock Nation, an indigenous community with historical connections to water, fishing, and whaling. Leonard's early life and her identity was heavily influenced by the coastal way of life of the Shinnecock community.

In 2014, Leonard began BREACH, a mixed media project that delves into the multiple definitions of the word, as well as, how it pertains to her life as a member of the Shinnecock Nation. With her work, she confronts audiences with the question, "Can a culture sustain itself when it no longer has access to the environment that fashioned its culture?"

In 2024 her work featured in an exhibition titled The New Transcendence at the Friedman Benda Gallery in New York (a group show curated by Glenn Adamson also featuring works by Ini Archibong, Andrea Branzi, Stephen Burks, Najla El Zein, and Samuel Ross).

Leonard currently resides in Northfield, MN.

== Education ==
Courtney M. Leonard attended the Institute of American Indian Arts in Santa Fe, New Mexico. She received her associate degree in art and museum studies in 2000. Two years later, she received her bachelor's degree from Alfred University's NY College of Ceramics. Leonard received her Masters of Fine Arts in Ceramics from the Rhode Island School of Design in 2008.

== Artworks ==
Leonard has been working with clay since she was young but her first experience understanding the connection between herself and working with clay was in high school. From then on, she began using her artwork with ceramics to focus on the issues that the Shinnecock community faces with the ocean environment and sustainability.

- Artifice, 2016. Micaceous clay with glaze. This sculpture is a hollow medium-sized oval that has holes perforating its entire surface. The artwork is meant to resemble human-made artificial reef structures.
- BREACH #2, 2016. Glazed ceramics on Pallet. This artwork showcases various whale teeth made from clay, piled on a wooden pallet.
- SEWA SIS, 2017. Mixed Media Acrylic on Canvas, 48" x 36" x 2". This painting is a portrait of a young woman of the Shinnecock nation. She is dressed in traditional Shinnecock clothes with ivory jewelry.
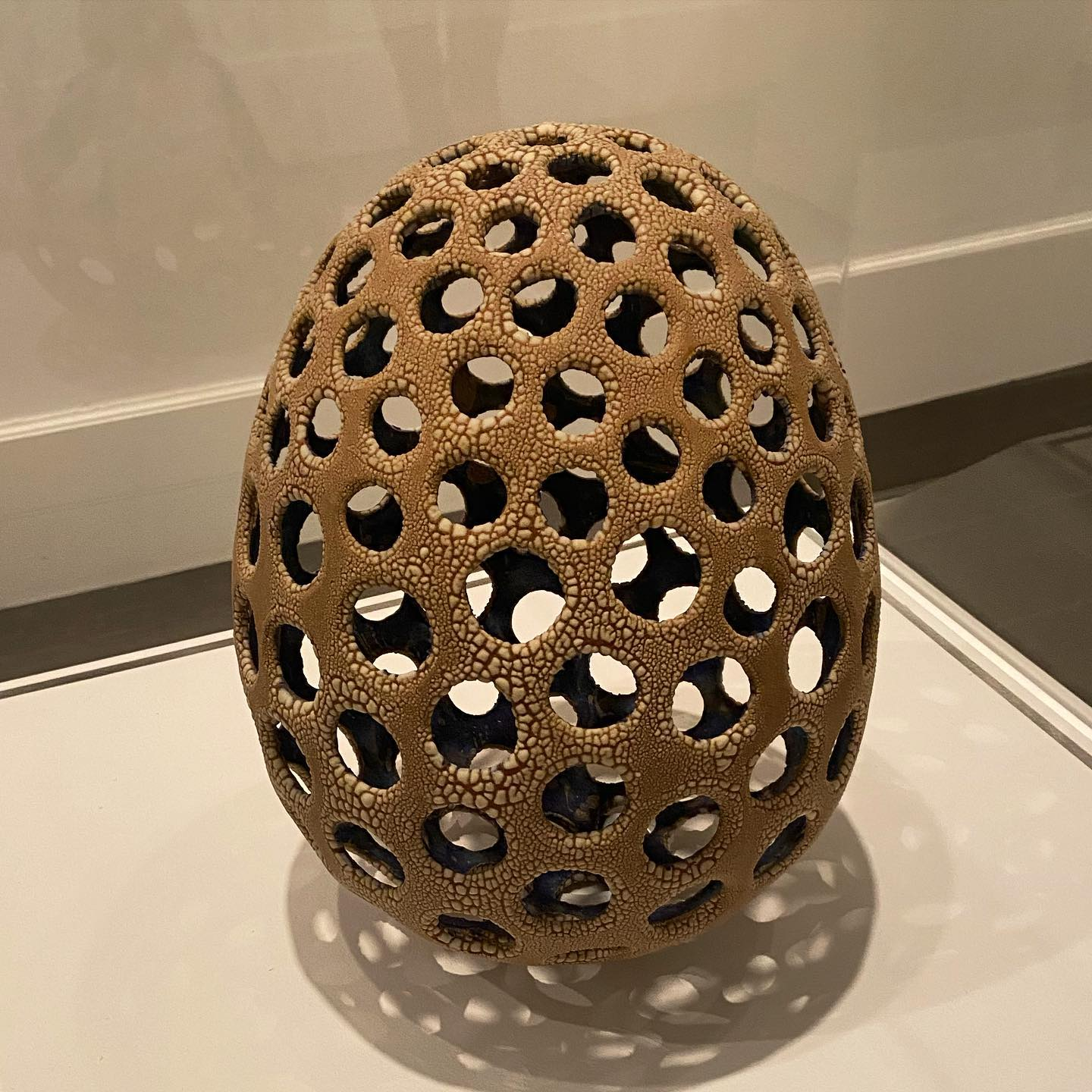
Artifice, BREACH: LOG 16

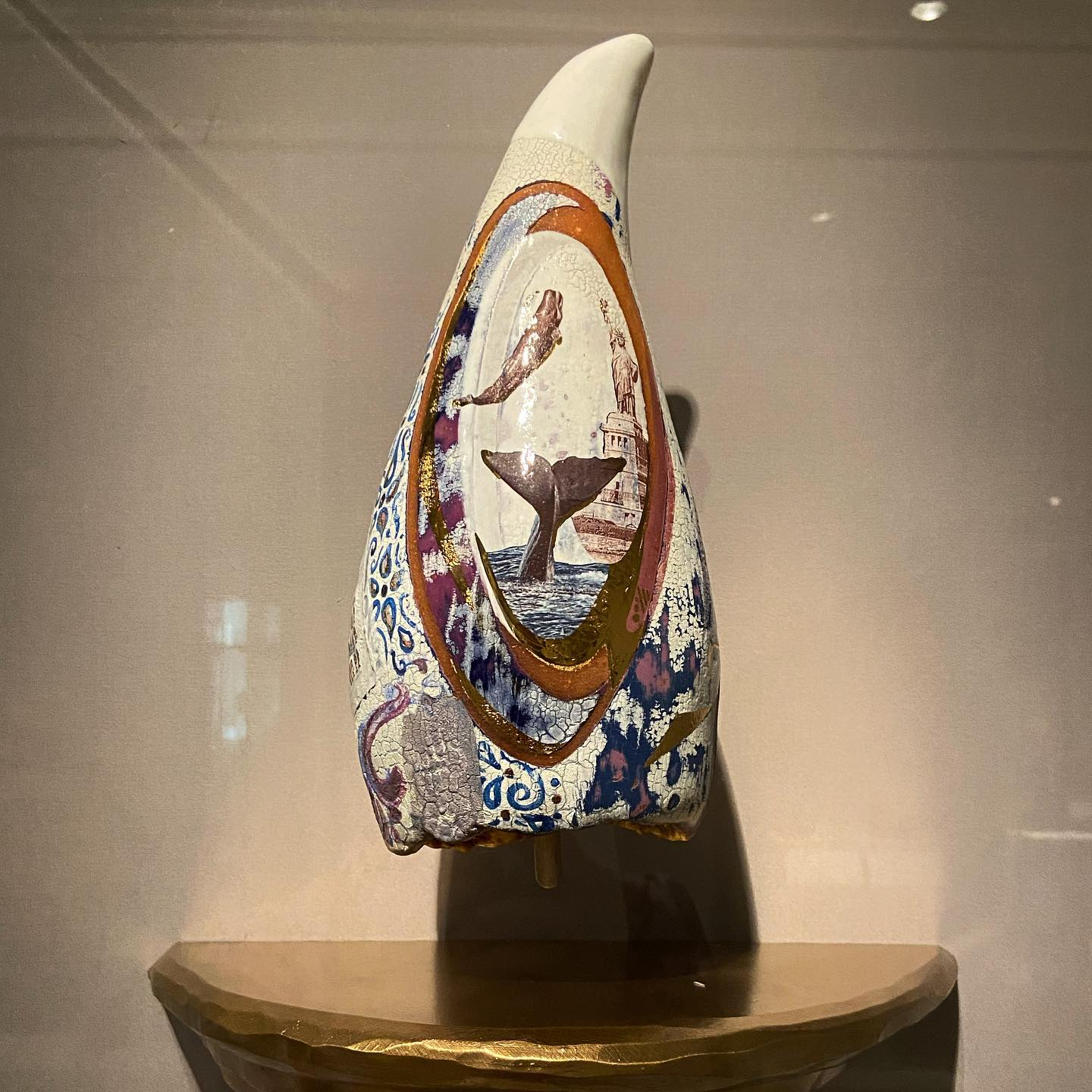

== Exhibitions ==
=== Solo exhibitions ===
- 2014 BREACH: LOG 2014, MoCNA, Santa Fe, NMLEVEL/LAND, Lloyd Kiva New Gallery, Santa Fe, NM
- 2015 BREACH: LOG 2015, Stephens Art Gallery, University of the Ozarks, Santa Fe, NM
- 2016 BREACH: LOG 2016, ASU Art Museum: Ceramic Research Center, Arizona State University, Tempe, AZ
- 2017 BREACH: LOG 2017, Santa Fe Art Institute: Water Rights Residency, Santa Fe, NM
- 2018 BREACH: LOG 2018 – “EUPHOTIC”, Tansey Contemporary, Denver, CO
- 2023: Courtney M. Leonard: Logbook 2004–2023, the Heckscher Museum of Art; BREACH: Logbook 23, Planting Fields Foundation

=== Group exhibitions ===
Sources:

- 2011: Counting Coup, Invitational, Curator: Ryan Rice, Museum of Contemporary Native Arts, Santa Fe, NM
- 2014: “50 from 6”: Contemporary Ceramic Art From 6 Rocky Mountain States, Braithwaite Fine Arts Gallery, Utah Toi Ngapuhi, International Invitational Exhibition, Northland College, Ngapuhi, New Zealand Changing Hands: 3, Invitational, Curator: Ellen Taubman, Dave McFadden, Museum of Arts & Design, NY, NY 50/50: Fifty Artists, Fifty Years, Museum of Contemporary Native Arts (MoCNA), Santa Fe, NM
- 2015: Art In Embassies Program: Limited Edition Prints, Invitational, IAIA & U.S. Embassies, USA/International Imago Mundi: Luciano Benetton Collection, Invitational, Venice Biennale, Venice, Italy Courtney M. Leonard & Frank Buffalo Hyde, Collaborative Exhibition, Modern West Fine Art, Salt Lake City, UT RISD: Radical Investigations of Systems and (Dis)connections, Invitational, RISD Memorial Hall, Providence, RI
- 2016: Radical Seafaring, Invitational, Curator: Andrea Grover, Parish Art Museum, Southampton, NYThe Path We Share, Invitational, Curator: David Diviney, Art Gallery of Nova Scotia, Halifax, Nova Scotia
- 2017: Without A Theme, Invitational, Pequot Museum, Mashantuckett, CT People of Color People of Clay, Invitational, Curator: Leslie King Hammond, Baltimore Clayworks, Baltimore, MDWe The People: Serving Notice, Invitational, American Museum of Ceramic Art, Pomona, CA
- 2018: Trees Also Speak, Invitational, Curator: Catherine Bernard, State University of New York (SUNY), Westbury, NYTHEY, Invitational, Curator: Roberto Lugo, The Clay Art Center, Port Chester, NY Small Favors, Invitational, The Clay Studio, Philadelphia, PA (in) Visible, Invitational, Curator: Amanda Barr, NCECA 2018 Concurrent Exhibition, Braddock Carnegie Library, PA
- 2024: The New Transcendence at the Friedman Benda Gallery in New York, NY

== Collections ==
=== Permanent collections ===
- American Museum of Ceramic Art, Pomona, CA
- Autry Museum, Los Angeles, California
- Art In Embassies, U.S. Embassies, USA/International
- ASU Art Museum Ceramic Research Center, Tempe, Arizona
- Crocker Art Museum, Sacramento, California
- Denver Art Museum, Denver, Colorado
- Gilcrease Museum, Tulsa, Oklahoma
- Heard Museum, Phoenix, Arizona
- Institute of American Indian Arts Museum, Santa Fe, New Mexico
- Museum of the North, Fairbanks, Alaska Mystic Seaport Museum, Mystic, Connecticut
- Museum of Contemporary Native Arts, Santa Fe, New Mexico
- Mashantucket Pequot Museum and Research Center, Mashantucket Connecticut
- Nerman Museum of Contemporary Art, Overland Park, Kansas Newark Museum, Newark, NJ
- New York State Museum, Albany, New York
- Oxford University, Oxford, United Kingdom
- Peabody Essex Museum, Salem, Massachusetts
- Pomona College Museum of Art, Pomona, California
- University Galleries, University of Reno, Reno, Nevada
- Shinnecock Nation Cultural Center & Museum, Southampton, New York
- Smithsonian National Museum of the American Indian, New York, New York

== Publications ==
- Leonard, Courtney, “On BREACH: Logbook 20 | NEBULOUS”, Form and Relation: Contemporary Native Ceramics, University of Washington Press, May 2020
- Leonard, Courtney, “The Art of Otherness”, 2018 NCECA Journal, pp 88–89
- Leonard, Courtney, “Without A Map: Staying In Clay (The Strategist)”, 2018
- Burnet, Carand: “Curating New Conclusions”, Art In New England, July/August, 2017, Meer, Althea: “Makers + Mentors: Hands-on with Leaders of Native Fashion.” Blog. The National Museum of the American Indian. NMAI, June 16, 2016. Web. 3. December. 2017.
- Quimby, Ella Marie: “Visiting Artist Explores Arctic Connections”, UAF Sun Star, November 22, 2016
- Meier, Allison: “Navigating the Recent Wave of Renegade Seafaring Art”, Hyperallergic, July 1, 2016
- Levere, Jane L.: “Review: Exhibition at Parish Museum Celebrates Rule Breaking”, June 24, 2016
- Young, Beth: “When Artists Take To The Sea, All The World’s A Canvas”, East End Beacon, May 29, 2016
- Trimble, Lynn: “BREACH LOG 16”, Phoenix New Times, June, 2016
- Montgomery, Katrina: “Poetic and Political”, ASU Now, April 8, 2016
- ICMN Staff, “IAIA Alumni Produce Prints for US Embassies Around The World”, Indian Country Today, December 11, 2015
- Abatemarco, Michael: “Art In Review: Courtney M. Leonard at MoCNA”, Pasatiempo, October 24, 2014
- Roberts, Kathaleen: “Exploring Intersections: Courtney Leonard Produces a Dialogue Between Artist and Viewer”, ABQ Journal, November 29, 2013

== Awards ==
Leonard has received many awards, and residencies from institutions such as, The Andy Warhol Foundation, The Robert Rauschenberg Foundation, The Rasumon Foundation, The United States Art In Embassies Program. She was awarded the 2018 National Artist Fellowship from The Native Arts and Culture Foundation.
