= Yabu Pushelberg =

Design studio

Yabu Pushelberg is a design studio with offices in Toronto and New York City. The studio was founded in 1980 by Canadian designers George Yabu and Glenn Pushelberg.

== History ==
George Yabu and Glenn Pushelberg founded the studio in 1980. In 2025, Yabu Pushelberg appointed Waqas Ahmed as chief executive officer.

== Studio ==
=== Toronto ===
Yabu Pushelberg's Toronto studio occupies a former food distribution centre at 55 Booth Street in the east end of Toronto. The next door building, 59 Booth Street, previously housed the Avenue Road Showroom, a business partnership between George Yabu, Glenn Pushelberg, and Stephan Weishaupt. When Avenue Road relocated, Yabu Pushelberg acquired the property, joining the two buildings to create a 13,000 ft^{2} (1,200 m^{2}) studio space.

=== New York ===
Yabu Pushelberg's New York studio was established in 2001 and is home to the design house’s Brand Strategy, Lighting, Project Management, and Legal teams, as well as three Interior Design teams. After a decade in SoHo, the studio moved to a three-level heritage building on White Street in Tribeca.

== Interior ==
In 1984, Yabu Pushelberg designed its first major interior design project, a Club Monaco store in Toronto. In 1998, the studio won a James Beard Award for Toronto’s Monsoon Restaurant, including from Barry Sternlicht of Starwood Capital Group. Soon after, Yabu Pushelberg was selected to simultaneously design two hotels with identical budgets: the 500-room W Hotels New York flagship and the 57-room Four Seasons Marunouchi, Tokyo.

Yabu Pushelberg has worked for hospitality brands including Aman, American Express, EDITION Hotels in Honolulu, Miami Beach, London, and Times Square; Four Seasons Kuwait Burj Alshaya; New York Downtown and Toronto; Tokyo; Park Hyatt Bangkok; New York and Shenzhen; Park Lane Hotel; Rosewood Guangzhou; Viceroy Maldives Resort; Ritz-Carlton, The Chancery Rosewood and Asaya Spa; Raffles Sentosa Singapore; JW Marriott Hotel Tokyo; and Onuki Athens.

Retail projects include the LVMH-owned department store La Samaritaine; goop MRKT Toronto; Bergdorf Goodman; Barneys New York; Louis Vuitton Hong Kong; Lane Crawford Home Hong Kong; Printemps Paris; Tiffany & Co., Wall Street, New York; and The Palace Muli, Beijing.

== Product ==
Yabu Pushelberg has designed product collections including Man of Parts, B&B Italia, Collection Particulière, De Padova, Eggersmann, Fantini, Glas Italia, Henge, Lasvit, Ligne Roset, Linteloo, Marset, Molteni&C, Neinkämper, Pampaloni, Salvatori, Tai Ping, Tribu, Van Rossum, Warp and Weft, HC28, cc-tapis, Zucchetti, MDF Italia, Leolux, CEA, and Stellar Works.

Several of the studio’s product collections have been introduced at Salone del Mobile in Milan, 3 Days of Design in Copenhagen, and ICFF Shanghai.

== Education ==
=== Scholarships ===
As alumni of Ryerson University, George Yabu and Glenn Pushelberg created a permanent scholarship and internship program. The Yabu Pushelberg Award for Innovation in Interior Design supports student entrepreneurs and provides professional mentorship.

In 2016, Yabu Pushelberg created the Yabu Pushelberg Endowed Scholarship Fund at The New School, supporting a permanent named scholarship for a student in the Interior Design Program at Parsons.

== Awards ==
Yabu Pushelberg has received several industry awards: AD 100 Hall of Fame, BoF 500, Design Studio of the Year Public Vote, and Elle Decor A-List Designers. In 2014, founders George Yabu and Glenn Pushelberg were appointed Officers of the Order of Canada.
