= Textile Museum (Tilburg) =

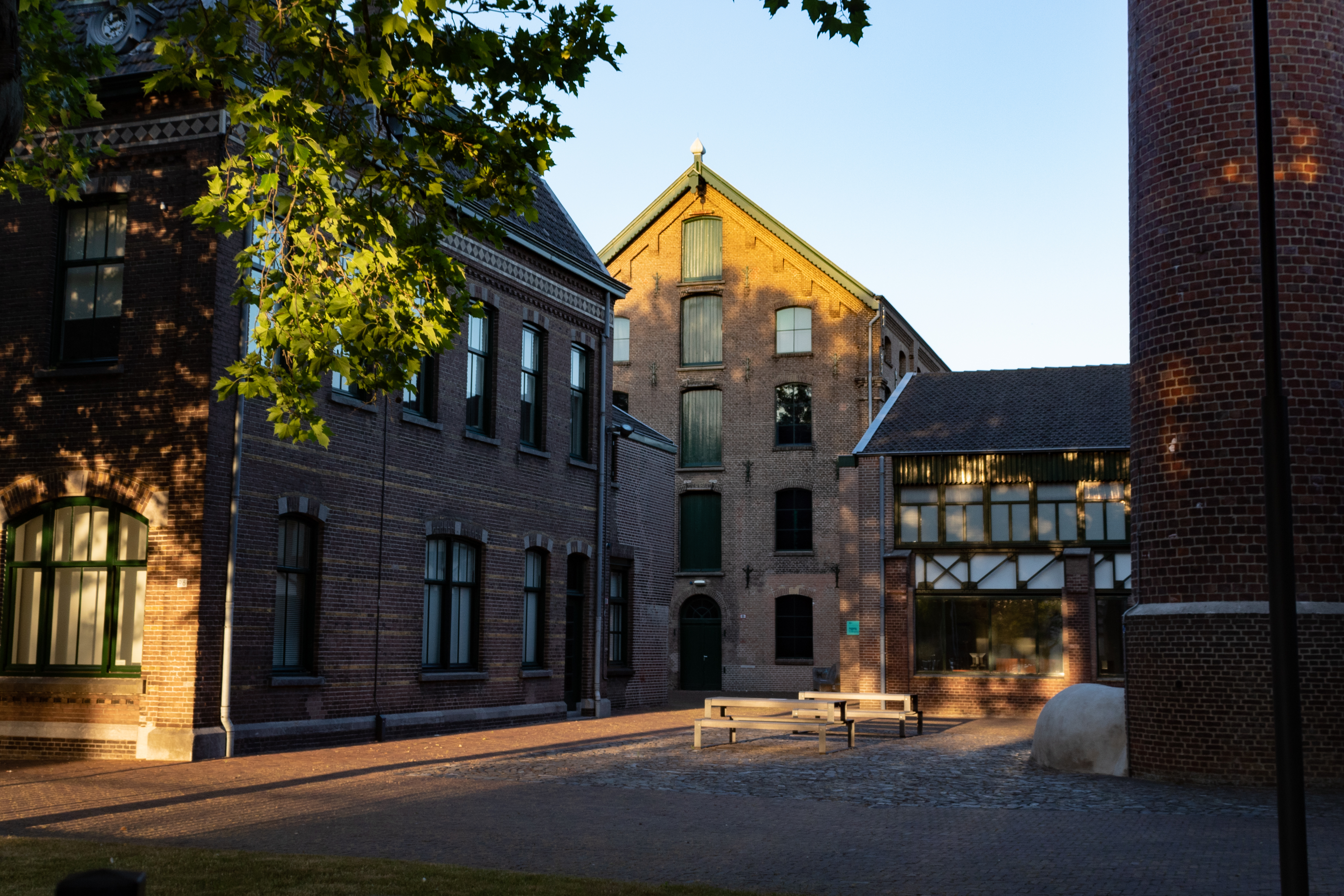
- The Textile Museum in Spring 2020
- Interactive fullscreen map
- Established: 1958; 68 years ago
- Coordinates: 51°34′15″N 5°04′47″E
- Type: Art museum
- Director: Nathanja van Dijk
- Website: https://www.textielmuseum.nl/

The Textile Museum is a museum dedicated to the art of textiles in the city of Tilburg in the Dutch province, North Brabant. The museum was opened in 1958 in a former villa related to the factory, and since 1985 has been based in the former factory of the firm C. Mommers & Co., once one of the largest employers in Tilburg. In 2008, the museum was re-opened after a complete renovation.

Apart from the museum itself and its collection of fashion, textile design, fashion, visual arts and industrial heritage, there is a library, archive and the Textile Lab. The Textile Lab is a workshop that allows artists, designers and visitors to engage with the current practices in textile creation (for example, weaving, knitting, or embroidery)

In 2017, the Textile Museum won the annual Museumprijs for Museum of the year in the category of Design and Fashion. It 2023, it received its best ever visitor numbers, of 77,602.

The museum is governed as part of a larger foundation, the Stichting Mommerskwartier. The foundation also has responsibility for the Stadsmuseum Tilburg and the Regionaal Archief Tilburg.
