= CD Domingo Savio =

Dominican soccer team

Club Deportivo Domingo Savio
- Full name: Club Deportivo Domingo Savio
- Nickname: Dosa
- Ground: Estadio Olímpico La Vega; La Vega, Dominican Republic
- Capacity: 10,000
- League: Primera División de Republica Dominicana

Club Deportivo Domingo Savio is a Dominican soccer team based in La Vega, Dominican Republic. Actually plays in the Primera División de Republica Dominicana.

== Honours ==
- Primera División de Republica Dominicana: 1998
