= Dosa plaza =

Indian fast food restaurant chain

- Company type: Privately owned company
- Industry: Restaurant
- Founded: Mumbai (1997)
- Founder: Prem Ganapathy
- Headquarters: Mumbai, India
- Website: dosaplaza.com

Dosa plaza is a chain of fast food restaurants specializing in South Indian cuisine dosa. It was founded by Prem Ganapathy in 1997. Dosa plaza operates 72 outlets in India, New Zealand, Oman UAE and Australia.
