= Aid to Artisans =

Non-profit organization based in Washington, DC

- Founded: 1976
- Founder: James and Mary Plaut
- Type: International Economic Development
- Location: Washington, DC
- Region served: Worldwide
- Key people: Bill Kruvant, President; Maud Obe, Program Director
- Website: aidtoartisans.org

Aid to Artisans (ATA) is a project of Creative Learning 501(c)(3), a non-profit organization based in Washington, DC.

Aid to Artisans mission is to create economic opportunities for low-income artisan groups around the world where livelihoods, communities, and craft traditions are marginal or at risk.

== Overview ==
ATA helps artisans in more than 110 countries raise the standard of living for their families and their communities by building profitable businesses inspired by handmade traditions. ATA offers artisans access to new markets, business training, eco-effective processes and design innovations through a network of partners to promote sustainable growth and community well-being.

== History ==
Aid to Artisans was founded in 1976 in Boston, Massachusetts, by James S. Plaut, former Secretary General of the World Crafts Council (WCC), and his wife Mary. Working through ATA, their goal was to give artisans practical assistance selling their products thus providing them with sustainable streams of income. With this in mind, ATA began importing high quality crafts and selling them to museum stores in the United States under the assumption that this was the most fertile market for handcrafts.

However, in the early 1980s, ATA began moving away from the limited museum store market to a broader strategy of providing artisan groups with product development assistance, market links and business skills training: three services that remain at the core of the ATA model. At this time, ATA also started its Small Grants Program which gives artisans the means to improve their production capacity and quality by purchasing new equipment and materials.

In 1986, James and Mary Plaut retired and ATA moved to Farmington, Connecticut, the home of its new President Clare Brett Smith, an experienced commercial crafts importer and photographer. In 2000, ATA moved to its current office in Hartford.

ATA's first major project was funded by USAID in Honduras (1984–1986) and since then ATA has worked in over 110 countries throughout Latin America, Eastern Europe, Africa, the Middle East and Asia. Over the past 10 years, ATA’s efforts have leveraged nearly $245 million in retail sales. This income has empowered 125,000 artisans in 41 emerging regions of the world and more than 70% of the artisans ATA works with are women. ATA currently works in 12 countries throughout Africa, Asia and Latin America, including Benin, Burkina Faso, Colombia, Chad, Ethiopia, Guatemala, Haiti, Morocco, Mali, Mexico, and Tibet.

In October 2012, Aid to Artisans joined the Washington, DC–based non-profit Creative Learning as its new signature program. Since its inception, Creative Learning has managed a host of innovative people-to-people projects that serve the needs of communities in developing countries, working to protect human rights, improve educational opportunities and build peace.

== Network ==
ATA has worked with prominent designers such as Jonathan Adler.

The work of ATA Colombia spawned an independent organization Fundación Creata headed by Director Mauricio Rincon and Project Manager Julian Huerfano They joined ATA at the New York international Gift Fair in 2013.

Similarly, in September 2010, ATA's field office in South Africa became the independent organization The Africa Craft Trust.
