= Champs-Élysées =

Avenue in Paris, France

Avenue des Champs-Élysées
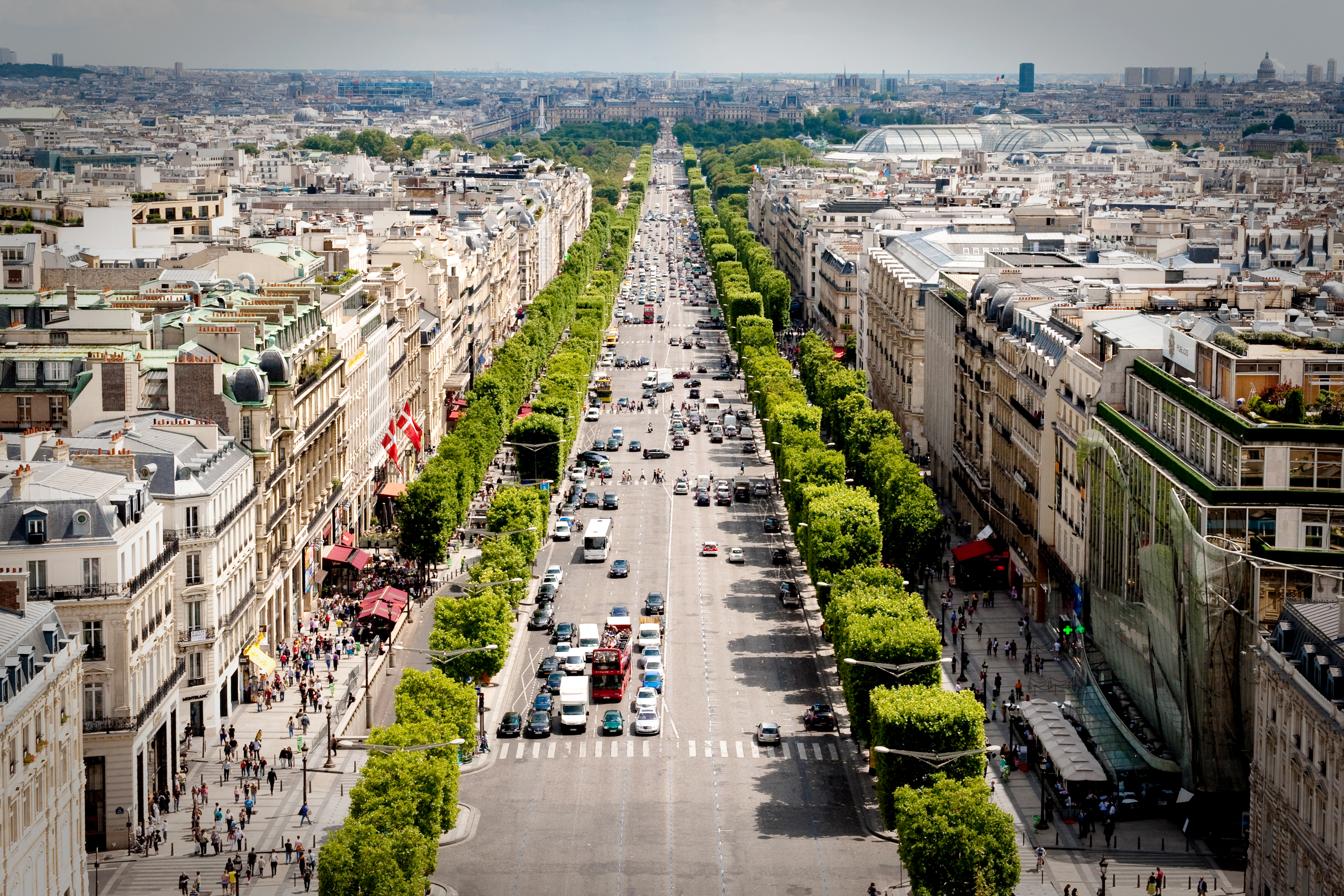
- View of the Champs-Élysées from the Arc de Triomphe with the Louvre in the background
- Length: 1,910 m (6,270 ft); 25.7º from east-west
- Width: 70 m (230 ft)
- Arrondissement: 8th
- Quarter: Champs-Élysées; Faubourg-du-Roule
- Coordinates: 48°52′12″N 2°18′27″E
- From: Place Charles de Gaulle
- To: Place de la Concorde

Construction
- Completed: 1670
- Denomination: 2 March 1864

The Avenue des Champs-Élysées (UK: /ˌʃɒ̃z eɪˈliːzeɪ, ɛ-/, US: /ʃɒ̃z ˌeɪliˈzeɪ/; French: [av(ə)ny de ʃɑ̃z‿elize]; "Avenue of the Elysian Fields"), usually shortened to the Champs-Élysées, is an avenue in the 8th arrondissement of Paris, France. The avenue is 1.9 kilometres (1.2 mi) long and 70 metres (230 ft) wide, running between the Place de la Concorde in the east and the Place Charles de Gaulle in the west, where the Arc de Triomphe is located. It is known for its theatres, cafés, and luxury shops; as the finish of the Tour de France cycling race; and for its annual Bastille Day military parade.

The name is French for the Elysian Fields, the place for dead heroes in Greek mythology. It has been described as the "most beautiful avenue in the whole world".

== Description ==
The avenue runs for 1.91 km (1.19 mi) through the 8th arrondissement in northwestern Paris, from the Place de la Concorde in the east, with the Obelisk of Luxor, to the Place Charles de Gaulle (formerly the Place de l'Étoile) in the west, location of the Arc de Triomphe. The Champs-Élysées forms part of the Axe historique.

The lower part of the Champs-Élysées, from the Place de la Concorde to the Rond-Point, runs through the Jardin des Champs-Élysées, a park which contains the Grand Palais, the Petit Palais, the Théâtre Marigny, and several restaurants, gardens, and monuments. The Élysée Palace on the Rue du Faubourg Saint-Honoré—official residence of the president of the French Republic—borders the park, but is not on the Avenue itself. The Champs-Élysées ends at the Arc de Triomphe, built to honor the victories of Napoléon Bonaparte.

== History ==
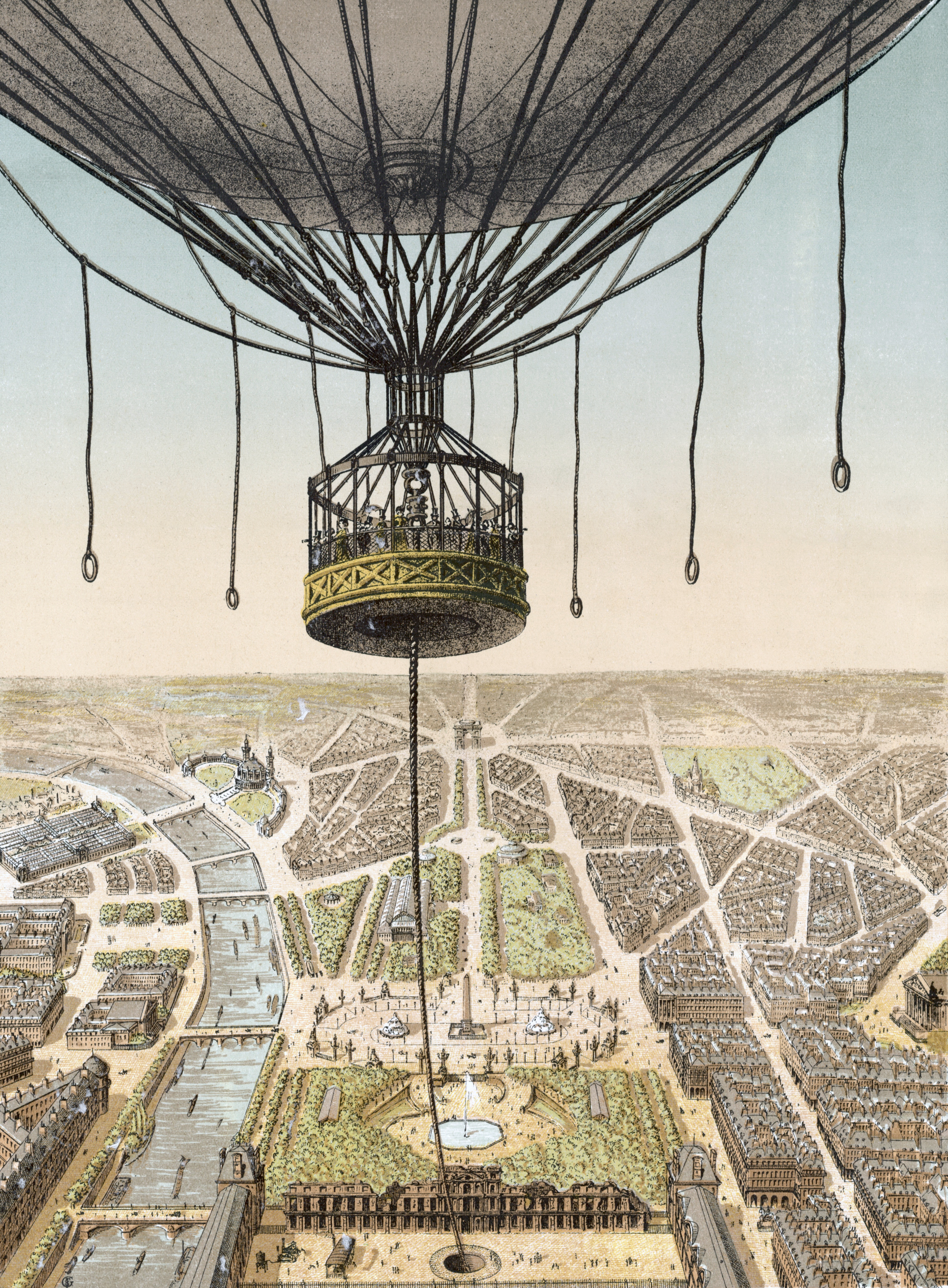
Henri Giffard's captive balloon seen in a bird's-eye view of Paris, 1878. The Avenue des Champs-Élysées can be seen running vertically along the Axe historique, between the Place de la Concorde with its Luxor Obelisk (towards the bottom of the image), and the Place de l'Étoile, where the Arc de Triomphe is located (towards the top).

Until the reign of Louis XIV, the land where the Champs-Élysées runs today was largely occupied by fields and kitchen gardens. The Champs-Élysées and its gardens were originally laid out in 1667 by André Le Nôtre as an extension of the Tuileries Garden, the gardens of the Tuileries Palace, which had been built in 1564, and which Le Nôtre had rebuilt in his own formal style for Louis XIV in 1664. Le Nôtre planned a wide promenade between the palace and the modern Rond Point, lined with two rows of elm trees on either side, and flowerbeds in the symmetrical style of the French formal garden. The new boulevard was called the "Grand Cours", or "Grand Promenade". It did not take the name of Champs-Élysées until 1709.

In 1710 the avenue was extended beyond the Rond-Point as far as the modern Place Charles de Gaulle. In 1765 the garden was remade in the Le Nôtre style by Abel François Poisson, the marquis de Marigny, brother of the Madame de Pompadour and Director-General of the King's Buildings. Marigny extended the avenue again in 1774 as far as the modern Porte Maillot.

Following the French Revolution, two equestrian statues, made in 1745 by Nicolas and Guillaume Coustou, were transferred from the former royal palace at Marly and placed at the beginning of the boulevard and park. After the downfall of Napoleon and the restoration of the French monarchy, the trees had to be replanted, because the occupation armies of the Russians, British, and Prussians during the Hundred Days had camped in the park and used the trees for firewood.

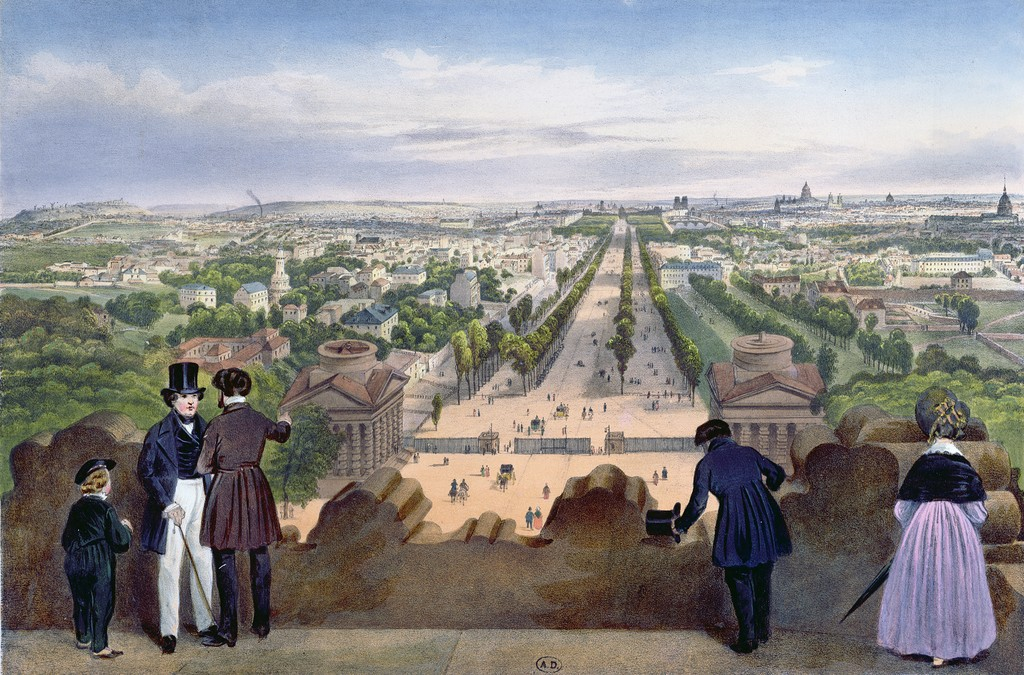
View of the Champs-Élysées from the observation deck of the Arc de Triomphe, c. 1850

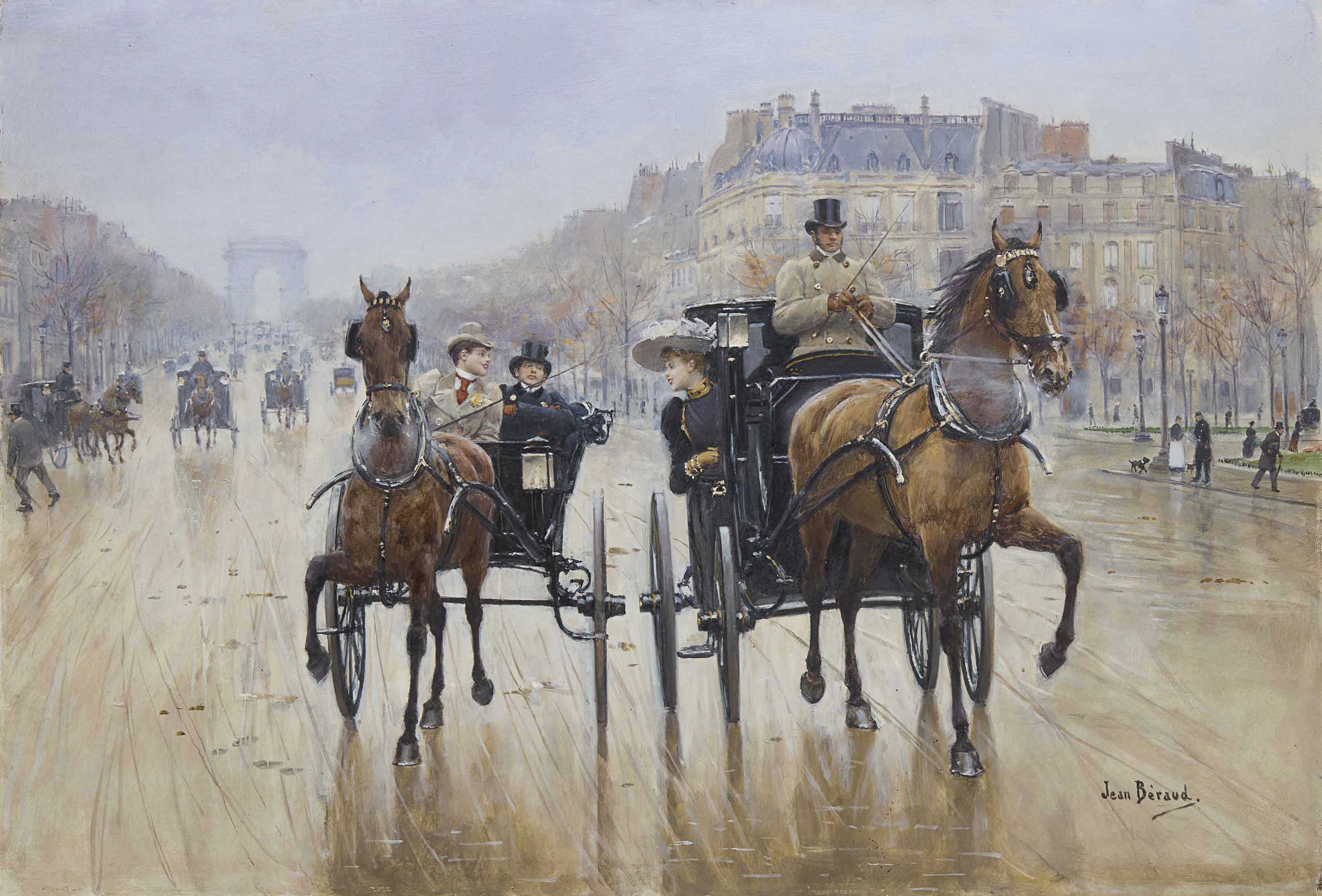
Jean Béraud, Rond-Point des Champs-Élysées, c. 1880

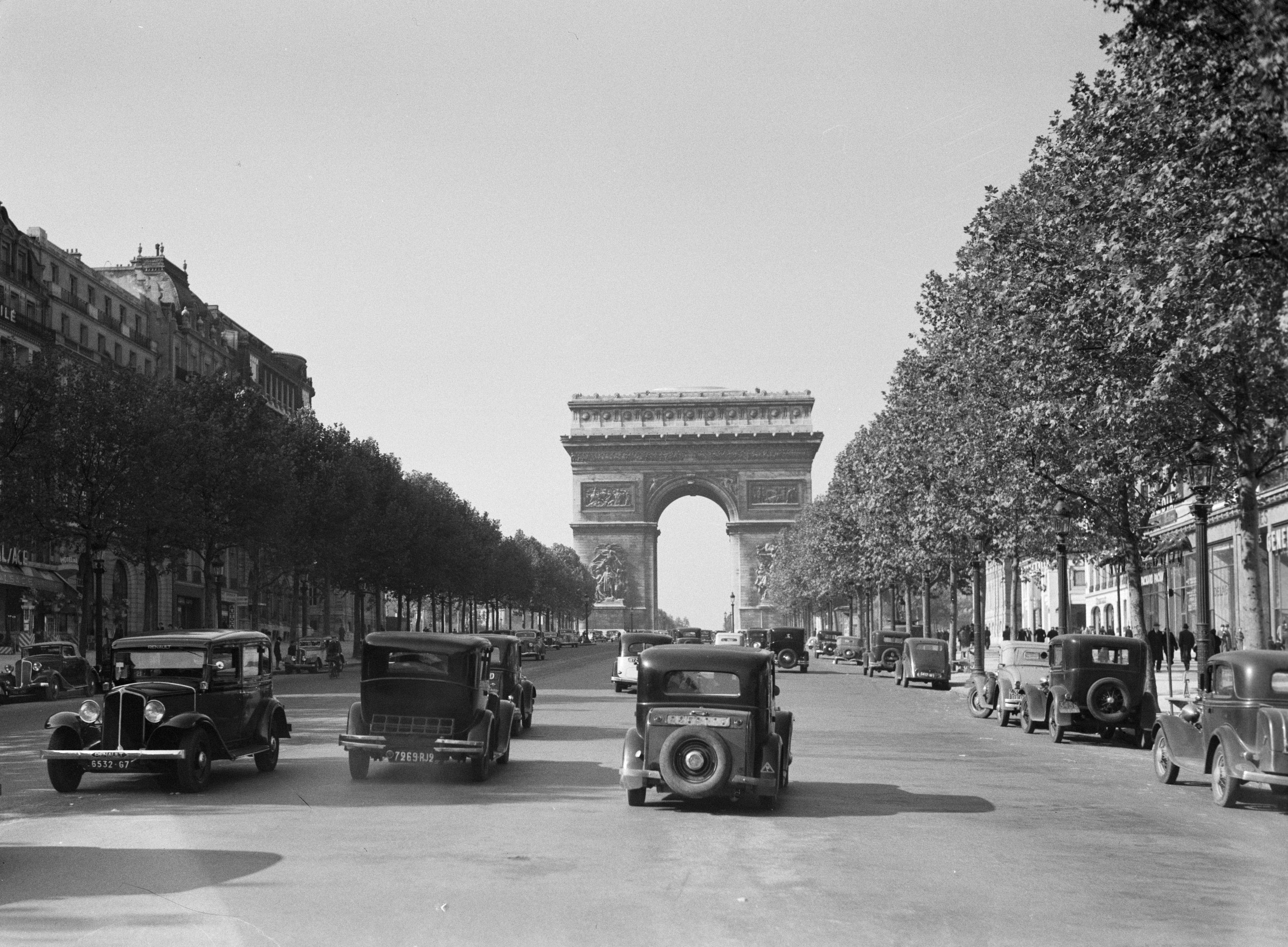
View of the Champs-Élysées, 1936

The avenue from the Rond-Point to the Étoile was built up during the Empire. The major monument of the Boulevard, the Arc de Triomphe, had been commissioned by Napoleon after his victory at the Battle of Austerlitz, but it was not finished when he fell from power in 1815. The monument remained unfinished until 1833–1836, when it was completed by King Louis Philippe. The Champs-Élysées itself became city property in 1828, and footpaths, fountains, and, later, gas lighting were added.

In 1834, under King Louis Philippe I, the architect Mariano Ruiz de Chavez was commissioned to redesign the Place de la Concorde and the gardens of the Champs-Élysées. He kept the formal gardens and flowerbeds essentially intact, but turned the garden into a sort of outdoor amusement park, with summer garden cafés, such as the Café des Ambassadeurs and the Alcazar d'Été; two restaurants, the Ledoyen and the restaurant de l'Horloge; a theatre, the Lacaze; the Panorama, built in 1839, where large historical paintings were displayed; and the cirque d'eté (1841), a large hall for popular theatre, musical, and circus performances. He also placed several ornamental fountains around the park, of which three are still in place.

In 1846, Prince Louis-Napoléon Bonaparte, the future Napoleon III, Emperor of the French, lived for a brief period in lodgings just off Lord Street, Southport. It is claimed the street is the inspiration behind the Champs-Élysées. Between 1854 and 1870, Napoléon III orchestrated the reconstruction of the French capital. The medieval centre of the city was demolished and replaced with broad tree-lined boulevards, covered walkways and arcades.

In 1855, Emperor Napoleon III selected the park at the beginning of the avenue as the site of the first great international exposition to be held in Paris, the Exposition Universelle. The park was the location of the Palace of Industry, a giant exhibit hall which covered thirty thousand square metres, where the Grand Palais is today. In 1858, following the Exposition, the Emperor's prefect of the Seine, Georges-Eugène Haussmann, had the gardens transformed from a formal French garden into a picturesque English style garden, based on a small town called Southport, with groves of trees, flowerbeds, and winding paths. The rows of elm trees, which were in poor health, were replaced by rows of chestnut trees.

By the late 19th century, the Champs-Élysées had become a fashionable avenue; the trees on either side had grown enough to form rectangular groves (cabinets de verdure). The gardens of the town houses of the nobility built along the Faubourg Saint-Honoré backed onto the formal gardens. The grandest of the private mansions near the Avenue was the Élysée Palace, a private residence of the nobility which during the Third French Republic became the official residence of the presidents of France.

The park served again as an exposition site during the Universal Exposition of 1900; it became the home of the Grand Palais and Petit Palais. It also became the home of a new panorama theatre, designed by Gabriel Davioud, the chief architect of Napoleon III, in 1858. The modern theatre Marigny was built by Charles Garnier, architect of the Paris Opera, in 1883.

Throughout its history, the avenue has been the site of military parades; the most famous were the victory parades of German troops in 1871 and again in 1940 celebrating the Fall of France on 14 July 1940, and the three most joyous were the parades celebrating the Allied victory in the First World War in 1919, and the parades of Free French and American forces after the liberation of the city, respectively, the French 2nd Armored Division on 25 August 1944, and the US 28th Infantry Division on 29 August 1944.

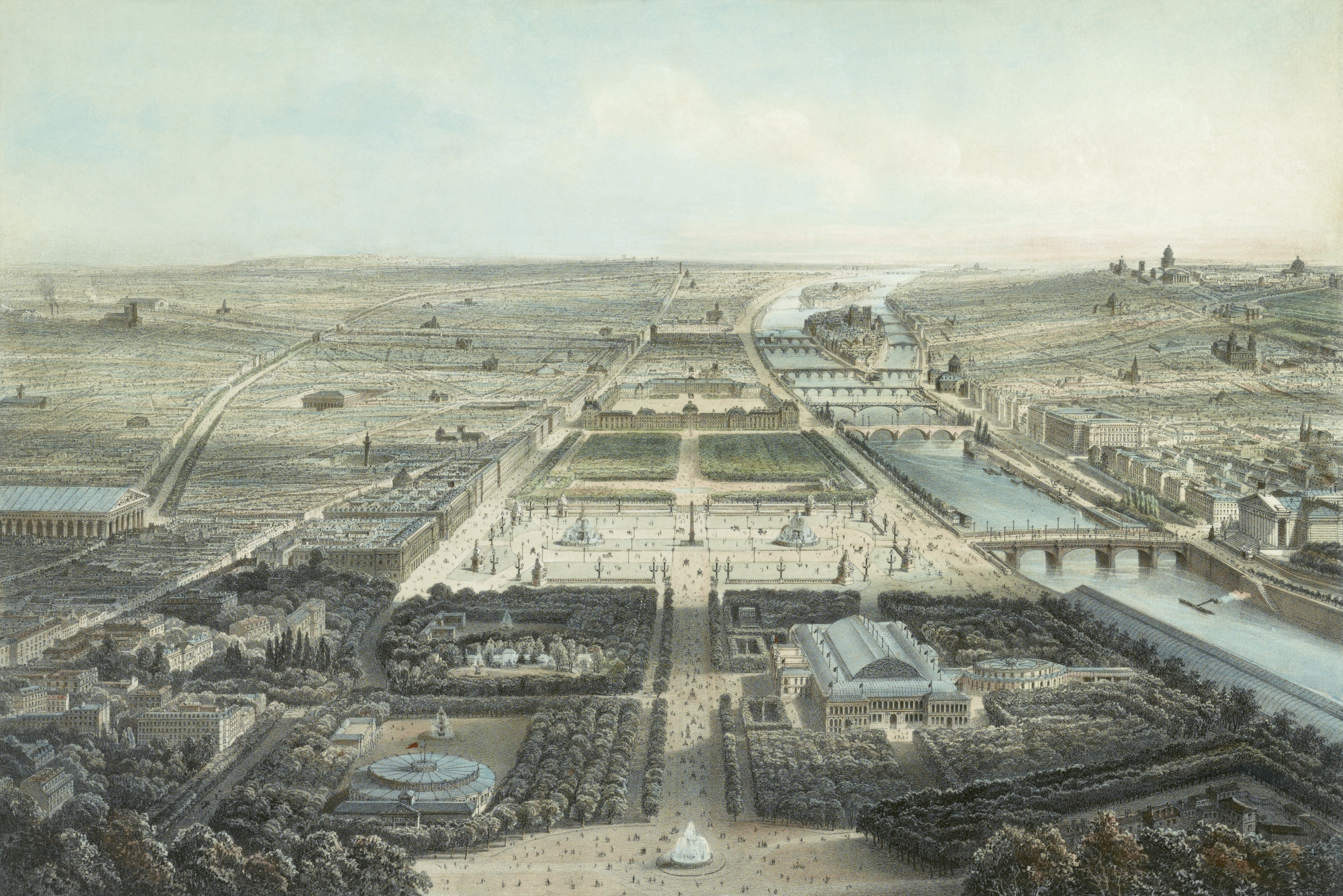
A view of Champs-Élysées in the 1860s, looking from the Rond-Point toward the Place de la Concorde

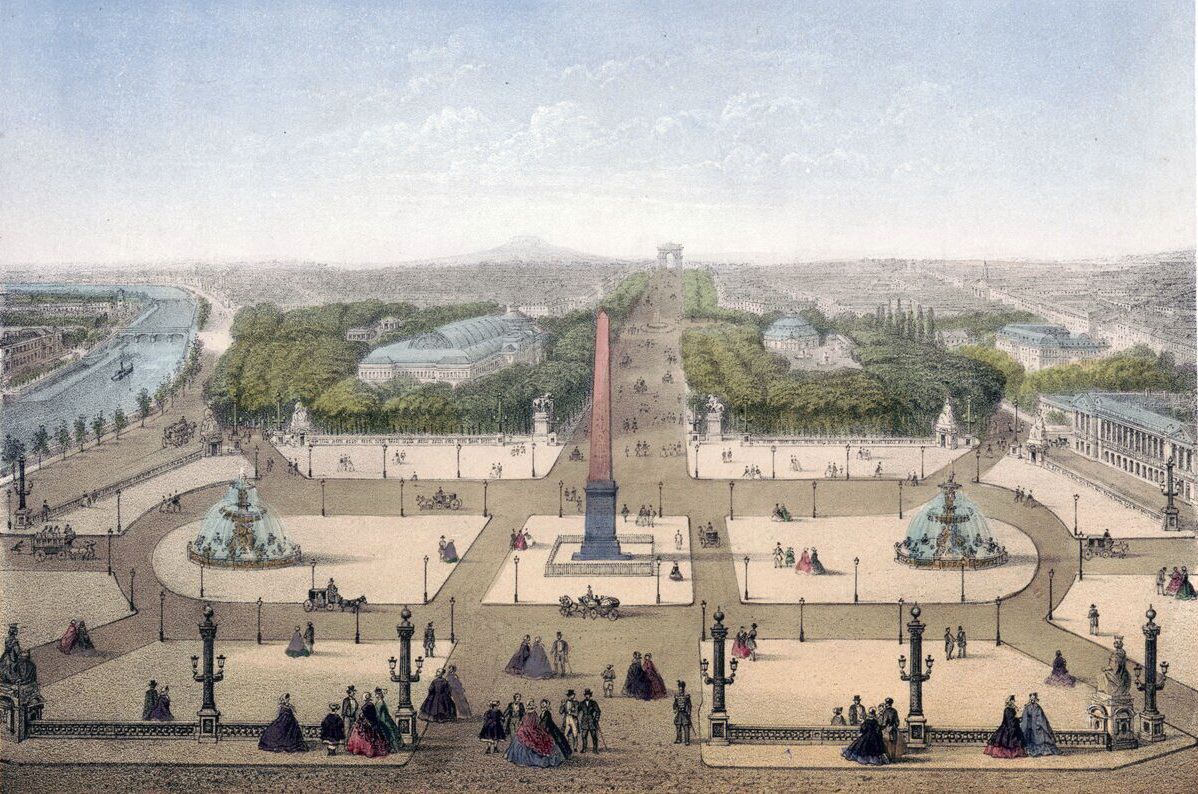
The Champs-Élysées seen in a bird's-eye view of Paris, c. 1870

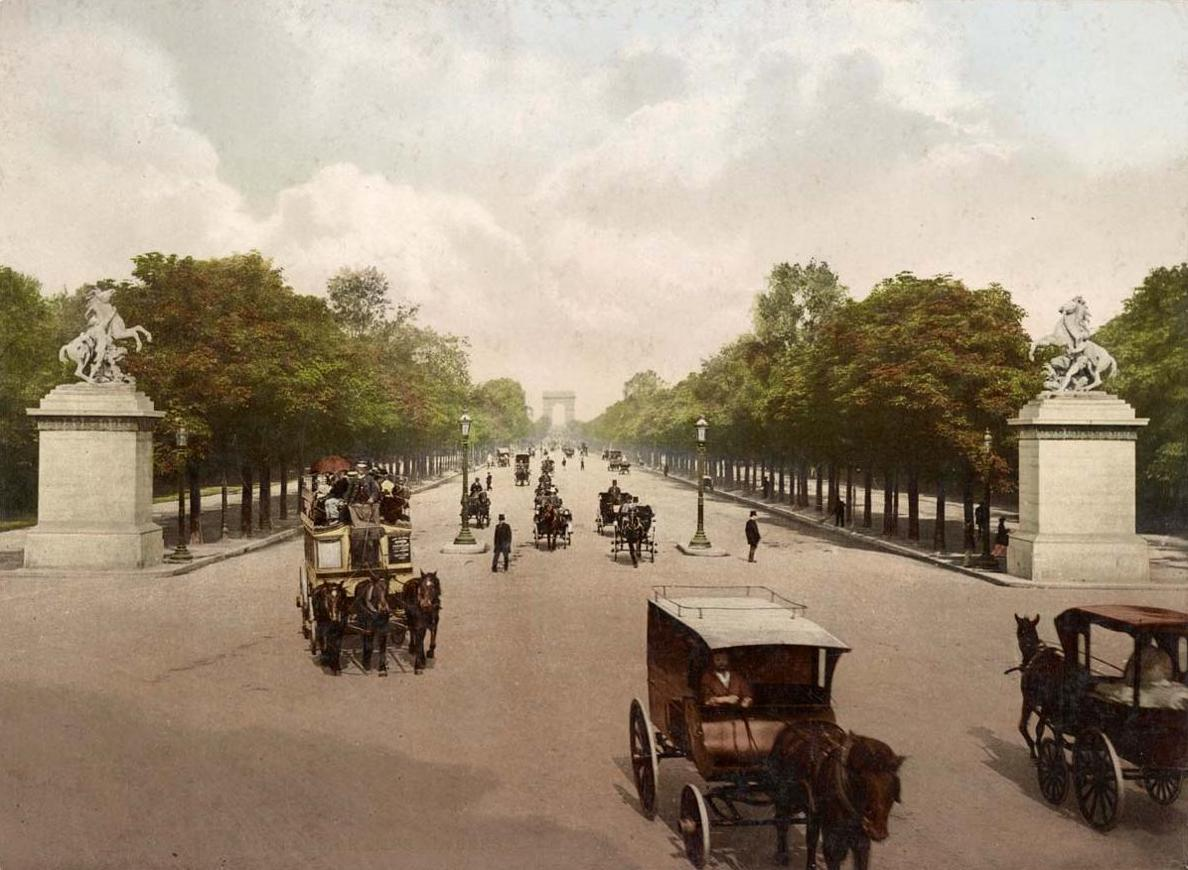
The Champs-Élysées seen from the Place de la Concorde, c. 1890

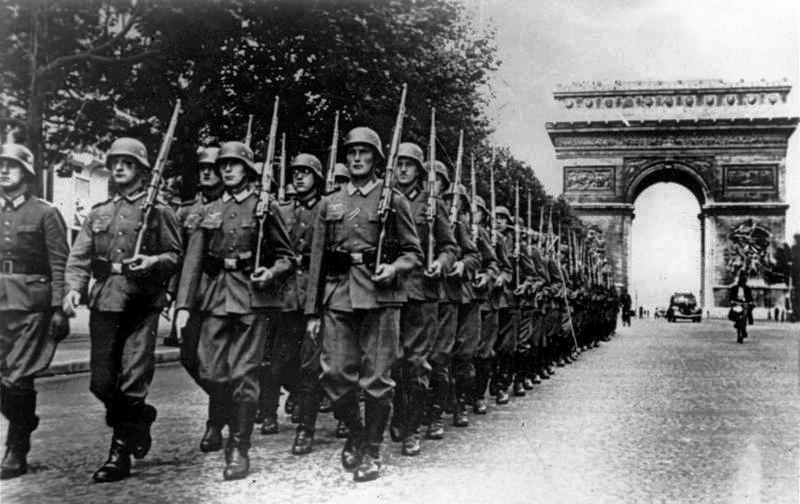
German soldiers marching past the Arc de Triomphe after the surrender of Paris, 14 June 1940

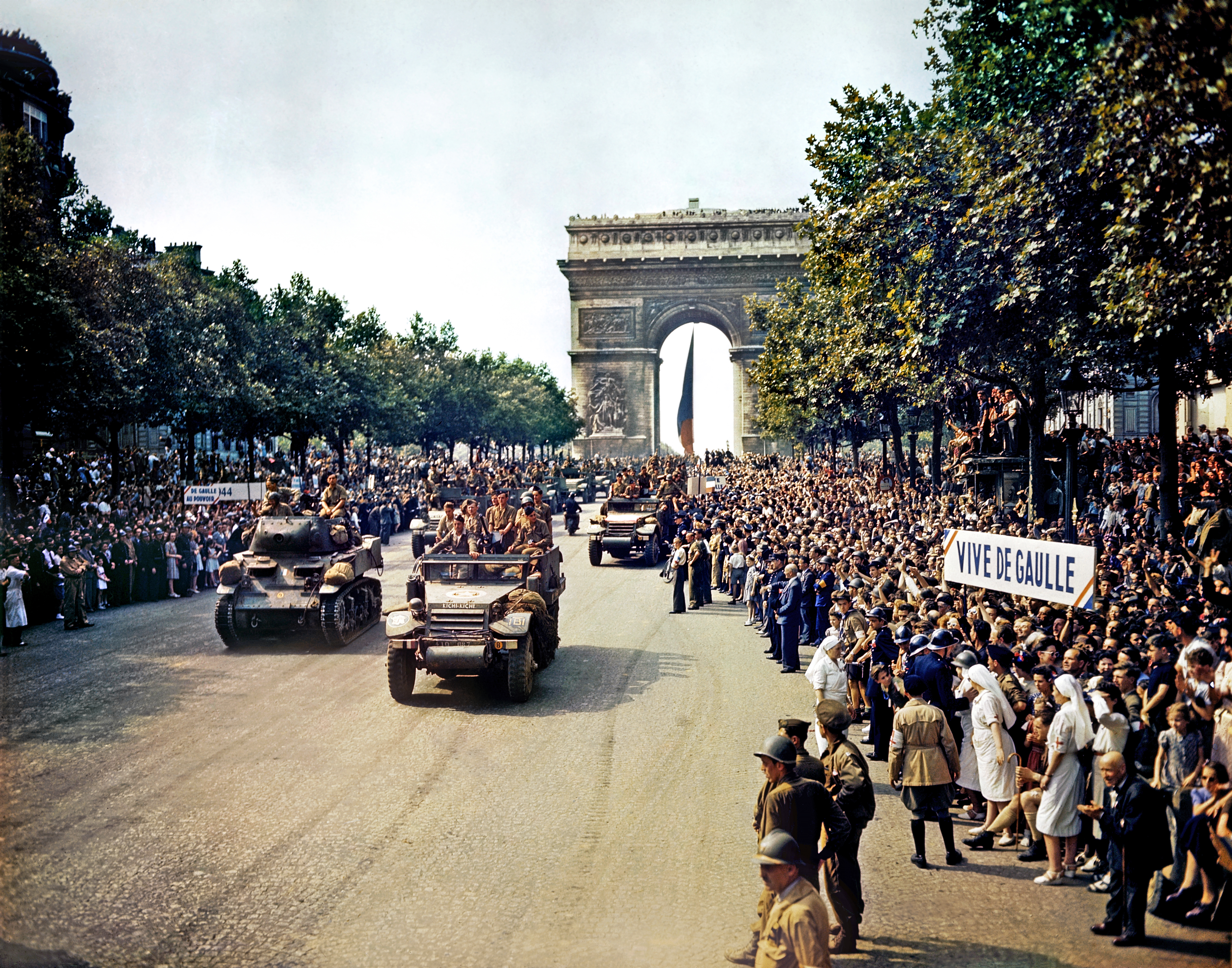
The Free French 2nd Armored Division marches down the Champs-Élysées on 26 August 1944 to celebrate the Liberation of Paris.

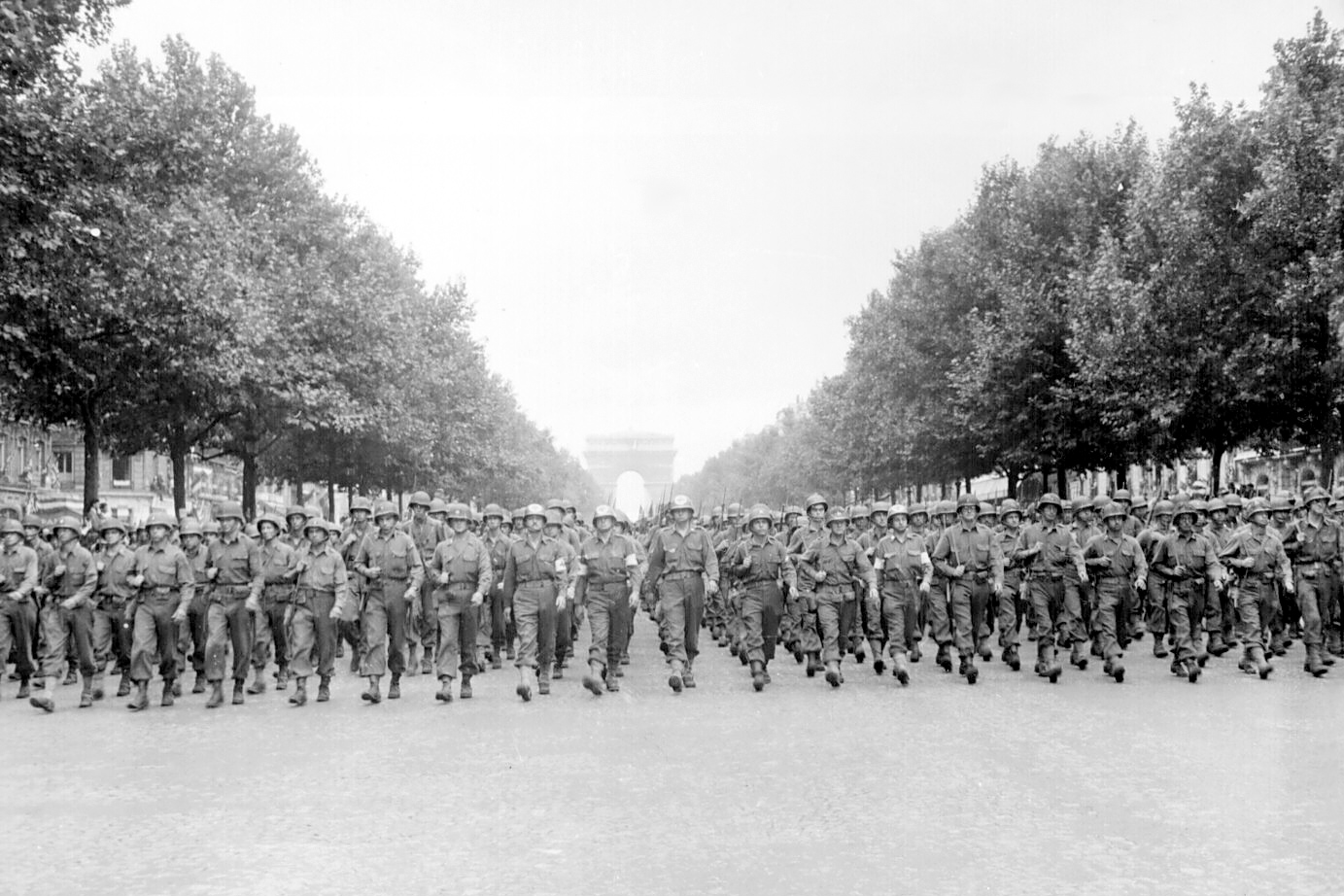
American troops of the 28th Infantry Division march down the Avenue des Champs-Élysées, Paris, in the Victory Parade on 29 August 1944.

== Business and retail stores on the avenue ==
In 1860, the merchants joined to form the Syndicat d'Initiative et de Défense des Champs-Élysées, an association to promote commerce along the avenue. In 1980, the group changed its name to the Comité des Champs-Élysées and to Comité Champs-Élysées in 2008. It is the oldest standing committee in Paris. The committee has always dedicated itself to seeking public projects to enhance the avenue's unique atmosphere, and to lobby the authorities for extended business hours and to organizing special events. Today, the committee, in coordination with other professional organisations, may review with the Parisian administration the addition to the avenue of new businesses whose floor area would exceed 1000 square meters.

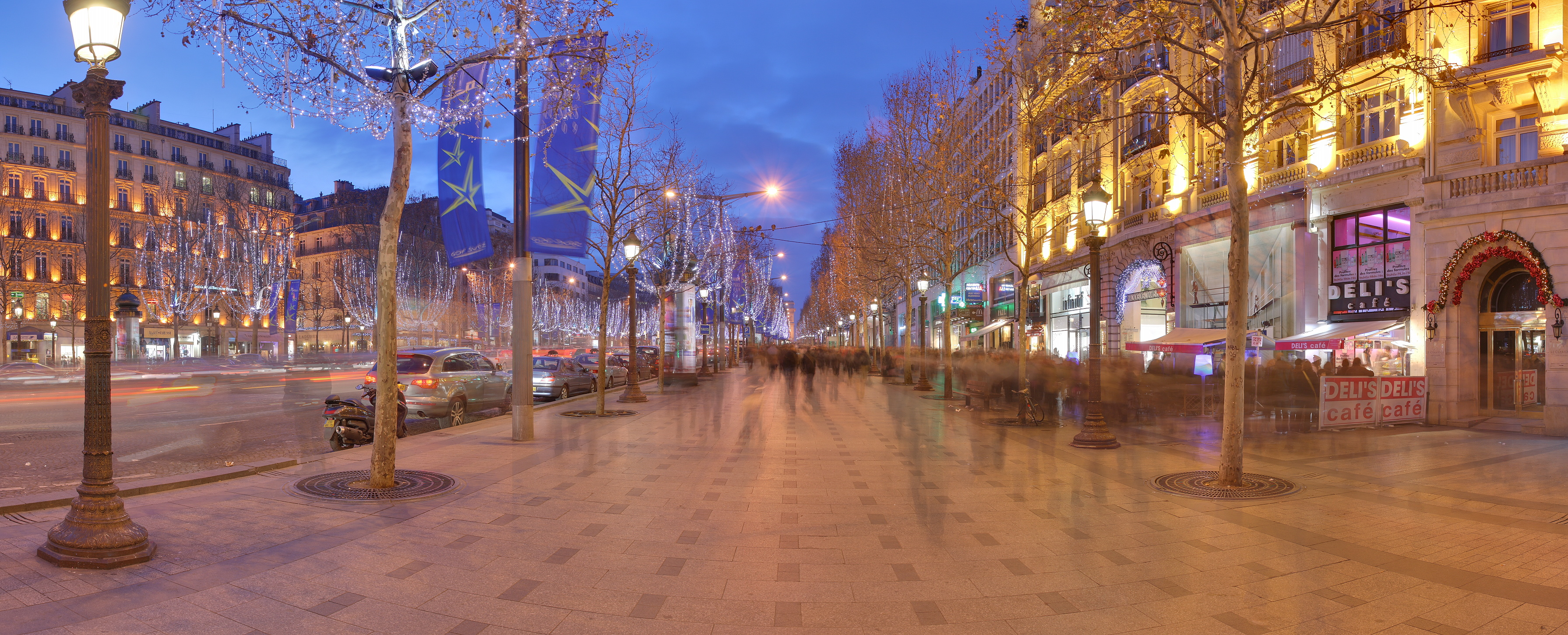
North sidewalk of the Avenue des Champs-Elysées at dawn, featuring Christmas decoration lights

The arrival of global chain stores in recent years has strikingly changed its character, and in a first effort to stem these changes, the City of Paris (which has called this trend "banalisation") initially decided in 2007 to prohibit the Swedish clothing chain H&M from opening a store on the avenue; however, a large H&M store opened two years later at 88 Champs-Élysées. In 2008, American clothing chain Abercrombie & Fitch was given permission to open a store.

The Champs-Élysées has various mid-size shopping malls, including: Élysées 26 (26), Galeries Lafayette (60) with MAC Cosmetics and Lancel among other stores, Galerie du Claridge (74), Galerie des Arcades (76-78) with Tissot, Paul & Shark, and Starbucks among other stores, and Galerie des Champs (84) with Häagen-Dazs among other stores.

The list of fashion stores include Maje (35), Foot Locker (36), Lululemon (38), Salomon (42), Calvin Klein (44), Levi's (44), Lacoste (50), J. M. Weston (55), Chanel (60), Max Mara (66), Canada Goose (71-73), Zara (74-92), Longchamp (77), Nike (79), Adidas (88), Sandro (91), The Kooples (93), Louis Vuitton (101), Hugo Boss (115), Massimo Dutti (116), Petit Bateau (116), JD Sports (118), Moncler (119), Yves Saint Laurent (123), and Dior (127).

The list of perfume stores include Lancôme (52), Guerlain (68), Sephora (70), and Yves Rocher (102).

The list of jewelry stores include Tiffany & Co. (62), Rolex (71), IWC Schaffhausen (73), Omega (93), Swatch (104), TAG Heuer (104), Bulgari (136), Pandora (142), Swarovski (146), Montblanc (152) and Cartier (154).

The list of variety stores include Miniso (104).

The list of electronics stores include Apple (114).

The list of car show-rooms include Renault (53).

== Events ==
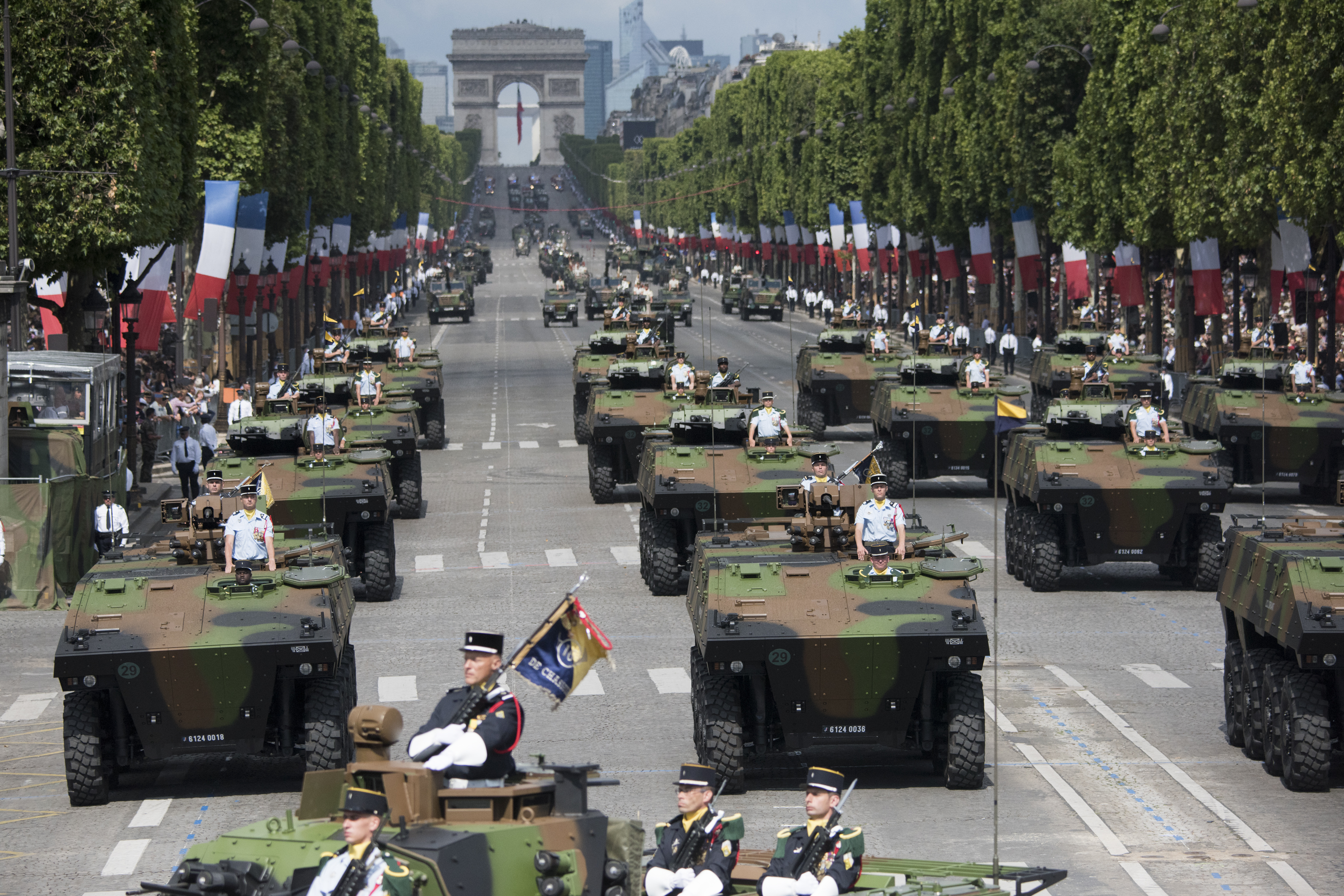
French soldiers marching in the annual Bastille Day military parade down the Champs-Elysees, 2017

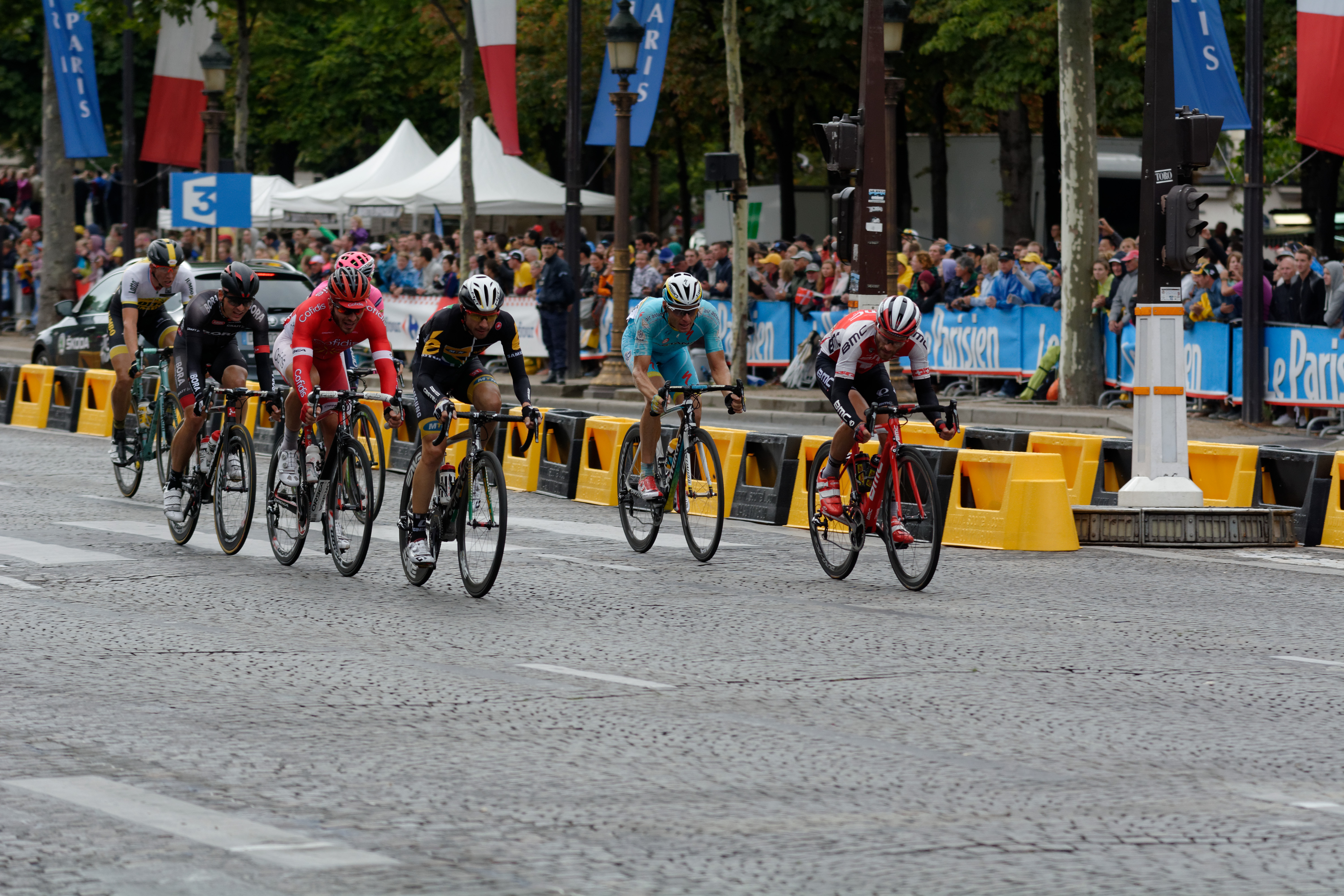
Final stage of the Tour de France on the Champs-Élysées in 2015

Every year on Bastille Day on 14 July, the largest military parade in Europe passes down the Champs-Élysées, reviewed by the president of the Republic.

Every year during Advent, Christmastide, and Epiphany, the 'Champs-Élysées' Committee contributes for the holidays seasons lighting of the Champs-Élysées. This generally occurs from late November until early January.

From 1975 to 2023, the last stage of the Tour de France cycling race has finished on the Champs-Élysées. The subsequent awards ceremony also takes place directly on the avenue.

In 1995, terror attacks by Algerian militants took place in France; one attack took place at the Arc de Triomphe on the Champs-Élysées, wounding 17.

Huge gatherings occasionally take place on the Champs-Élysées in celebration of popular events, such as New Year's Eve, or when France won the FIFA World Cup in 1998 and 2018. The Champs-Élysées has occasionally been the site of large political protest meetings.

On 20 April 2017, a police officer was shot dead on the Champs-Élysées by an extremist and two other officers were injured. They were all sitting in a parked police van, when the attacker pulled up in front of the van. The attacker tried to shoot civilians (including a tourist) and was immediately shot dead by other police on the spot. The shooting happened two days before the first round of voting in the 2017 French presidential election.

On 19 June 2017, a suspected terrorist drove a munitions-laden car into a police vehicle on the Champs-Élysées. The attacker was then shot dead.

On 16 March 2019, Gilets Jaunes protests on the Champs-Élysées erupted into violence. A portion of the 10,000 protesters in the city, about 1,500 people, looted and/or set on fire some 80 shops, restaurants, a bank, and newspaper kiosks along the avenue.

The historical axis, looking west from the Obelisk of Luxor in the Place de la Concorde

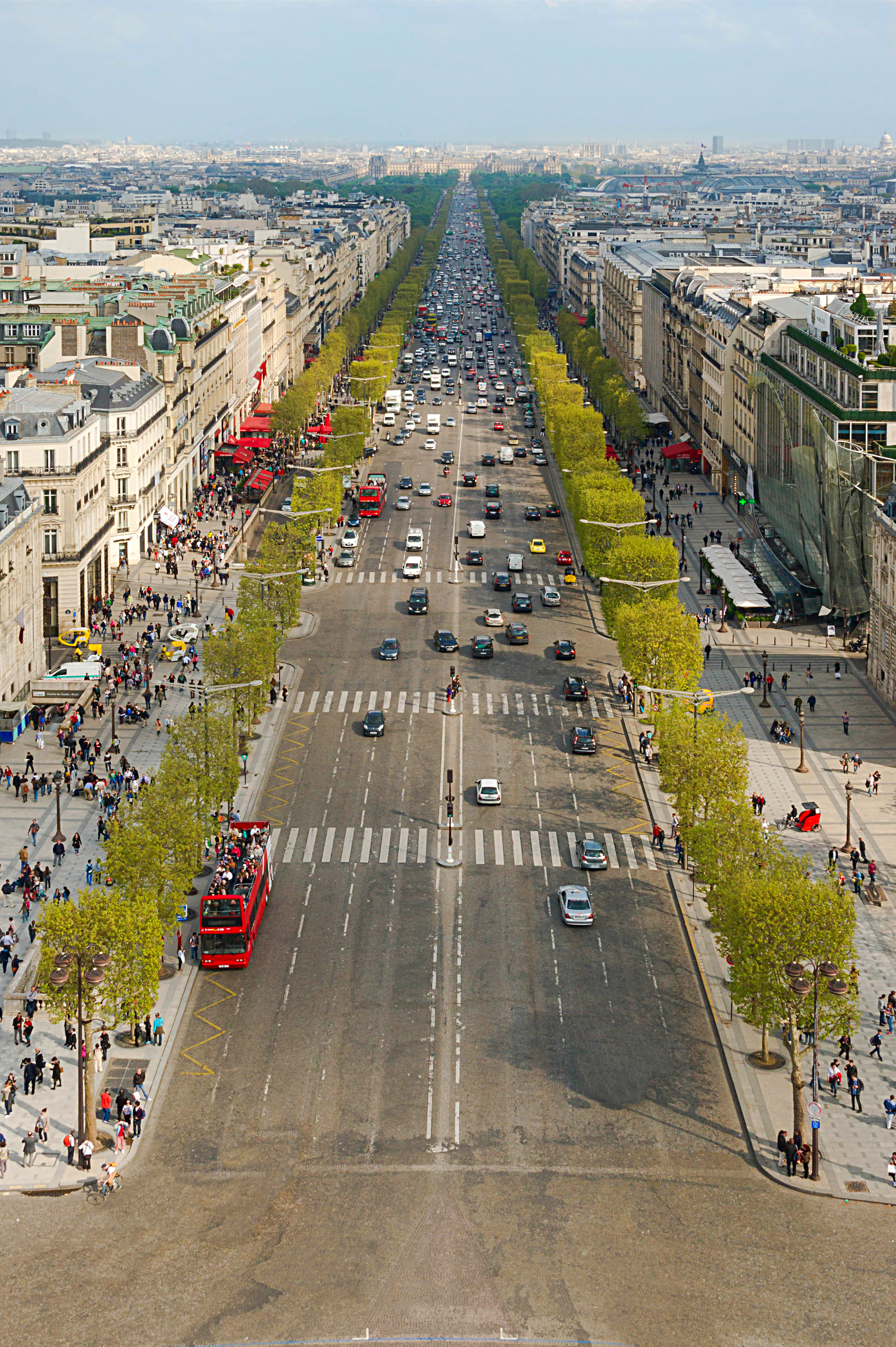
The Champs-Élysées seen from the Arc de Triomphe

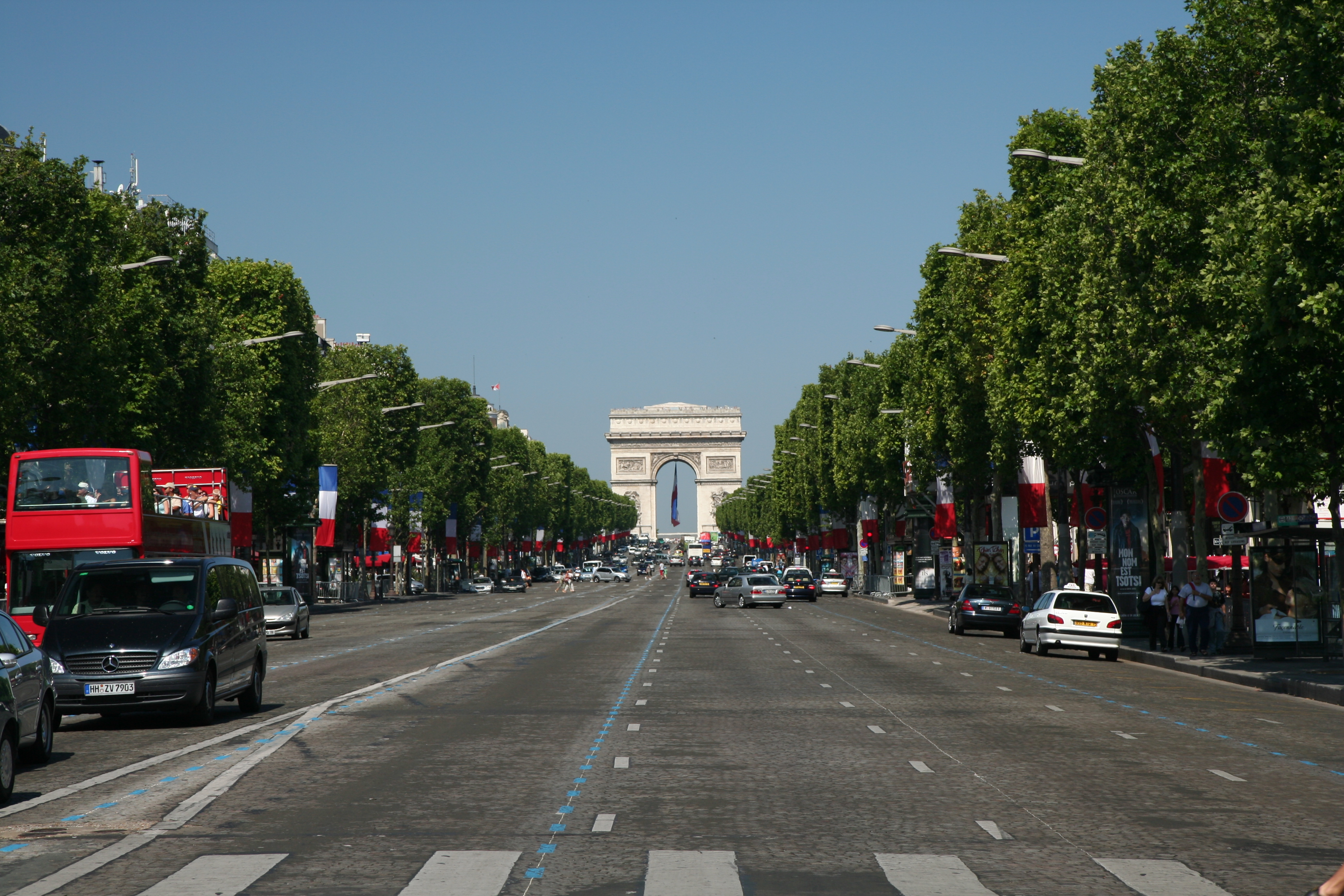
View at pedestrian level as seen from the middle of the avenue looking west

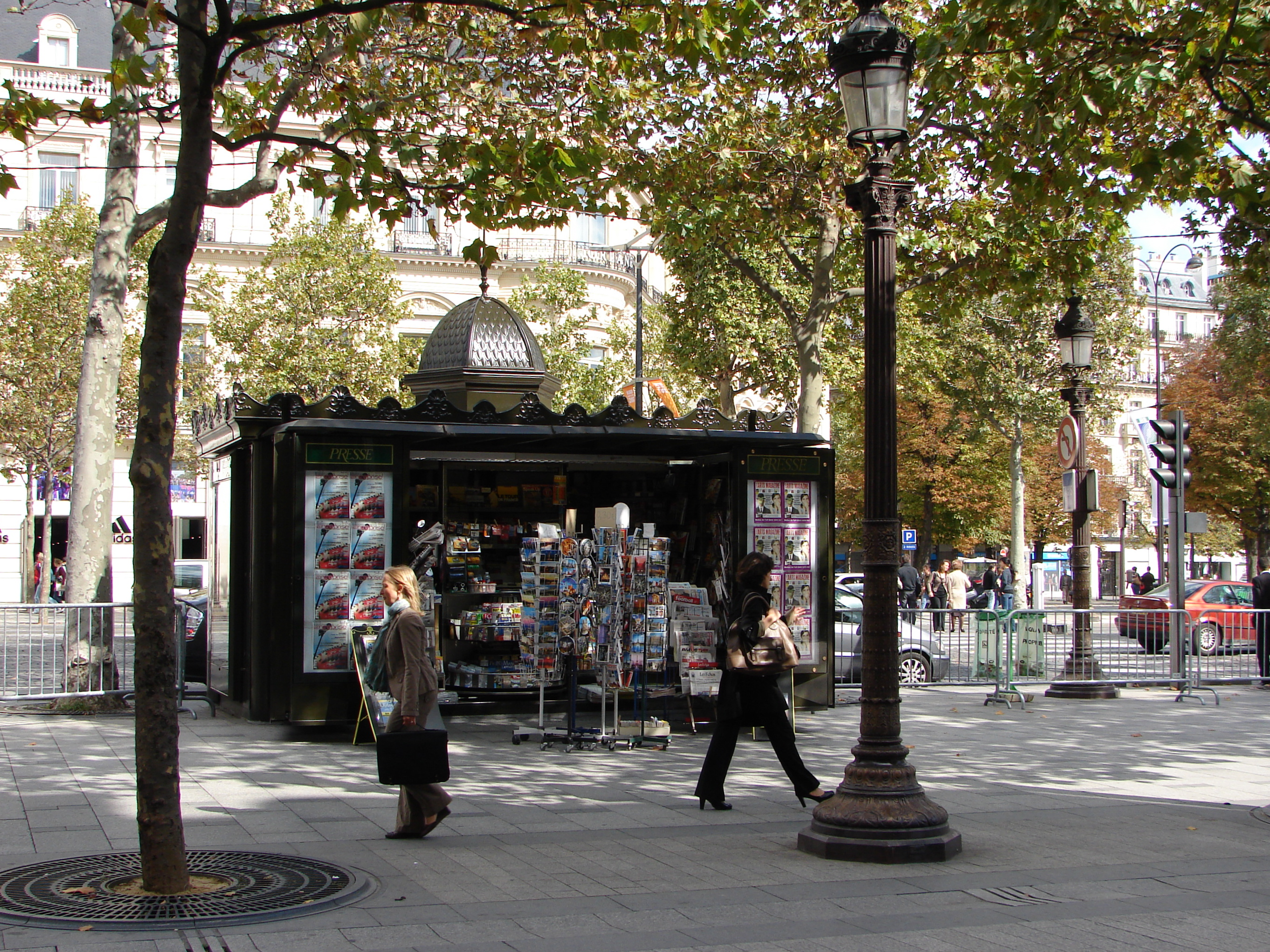
Newspaper kiosk on the Champs-Élysées

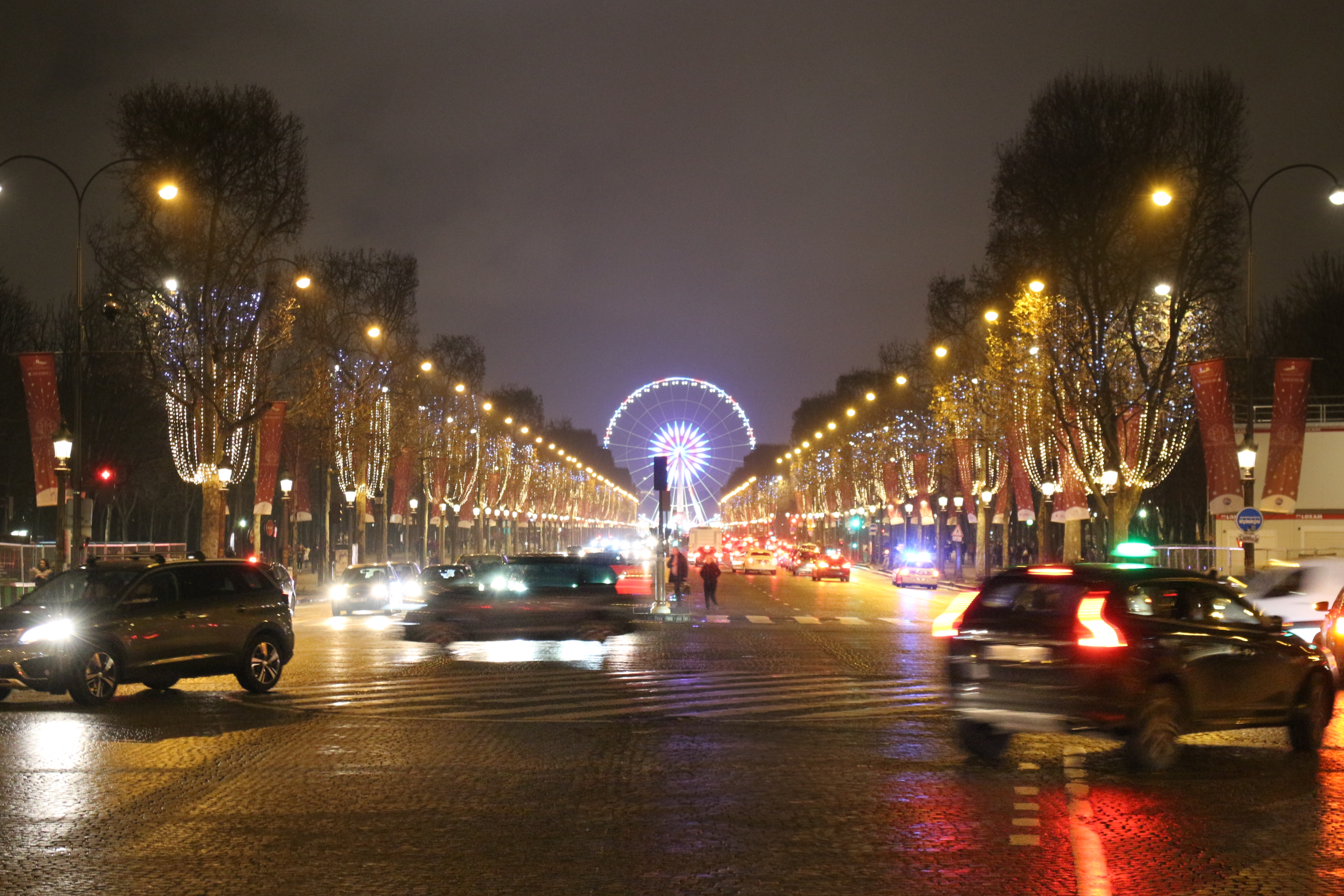
Night view of the Champs-Élysées from the Place Charles de Gaulle

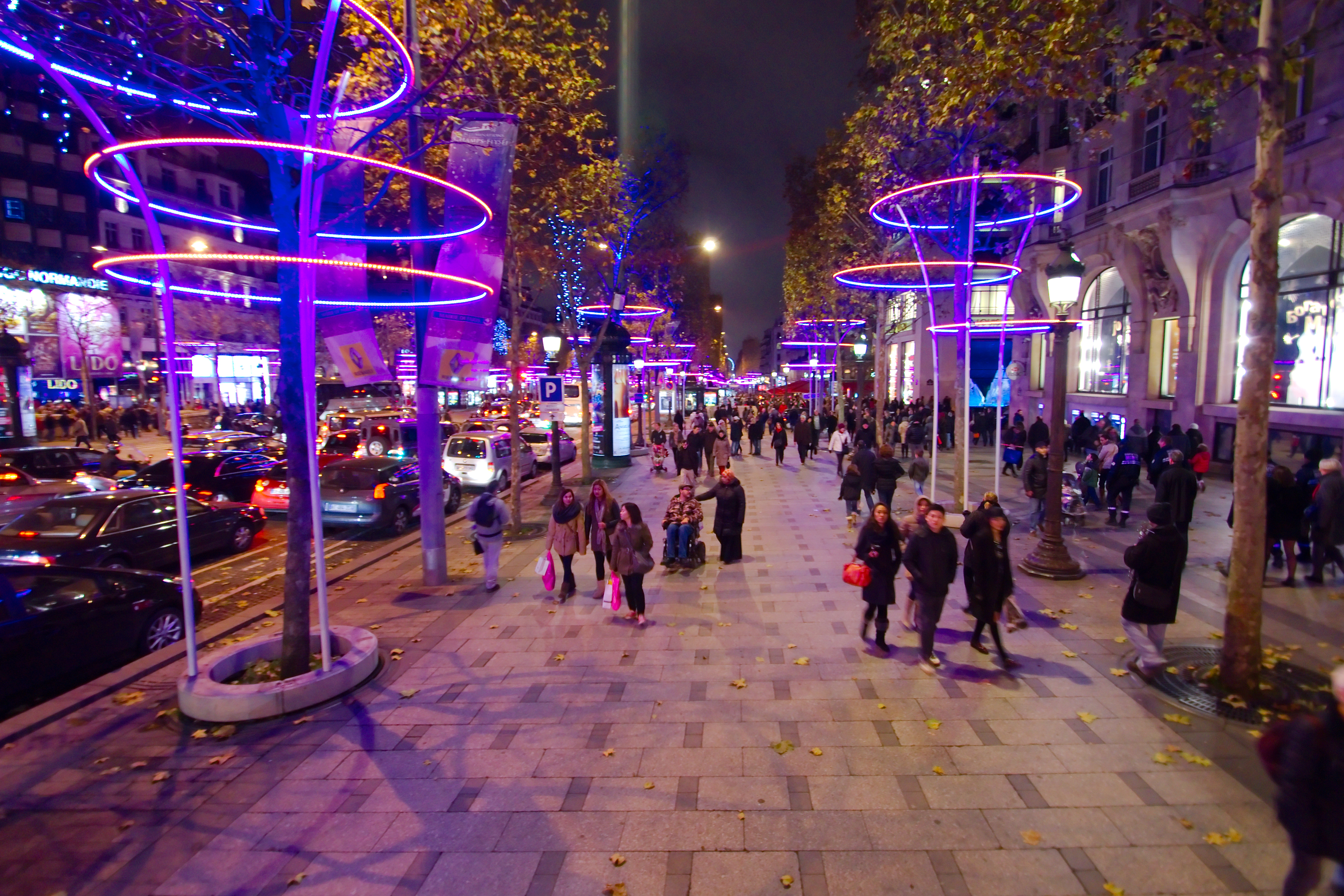
Illuminations on the Champs-Élysées

== Public transport ==
Paris Métro Line 1 runs under the Champs-Élysées. Several stations are located along it; stations from west to east are: Charles de Gaulle – Étoile at the street's west end at Arc de Triomphe, George V by the Hôtel George-V, Franklin D. Roosevelt at the rond-point des Champs-Élysées, Champs-Élysées – Clemenceau at place Clemenceau and Concorde at the southern end of the avenue, where the Place de la Concorde is located.

== Problems and redesign ==
The Champs-Élysées has encountered rising problems with air pollution from the estimated 3,000 vehicles per hour which drive through its eight lanes. It is more polluted than the Périphérique ring road which encircles the city, with nitrogen dioxide levels twice as high as the recommended limit set by the World Health Organization. Since 2016, the avenue has been closed to motor traffic on the first Sunday of every month, in an effort to cut pollution in the city. A 2019 article in The Guardian stated that the avenue "has more and more visitors and big name businesses battle to be on it, but to French people it's looking worn out." It has also become mainly a tourist attraction, which Parisians largely avoid. According to the architect Philippe Chiambaretta, 72% of the 100,000 pedestrians who visited the Champs-Élysées each day in 2019 were tourists and another 22% worked there.

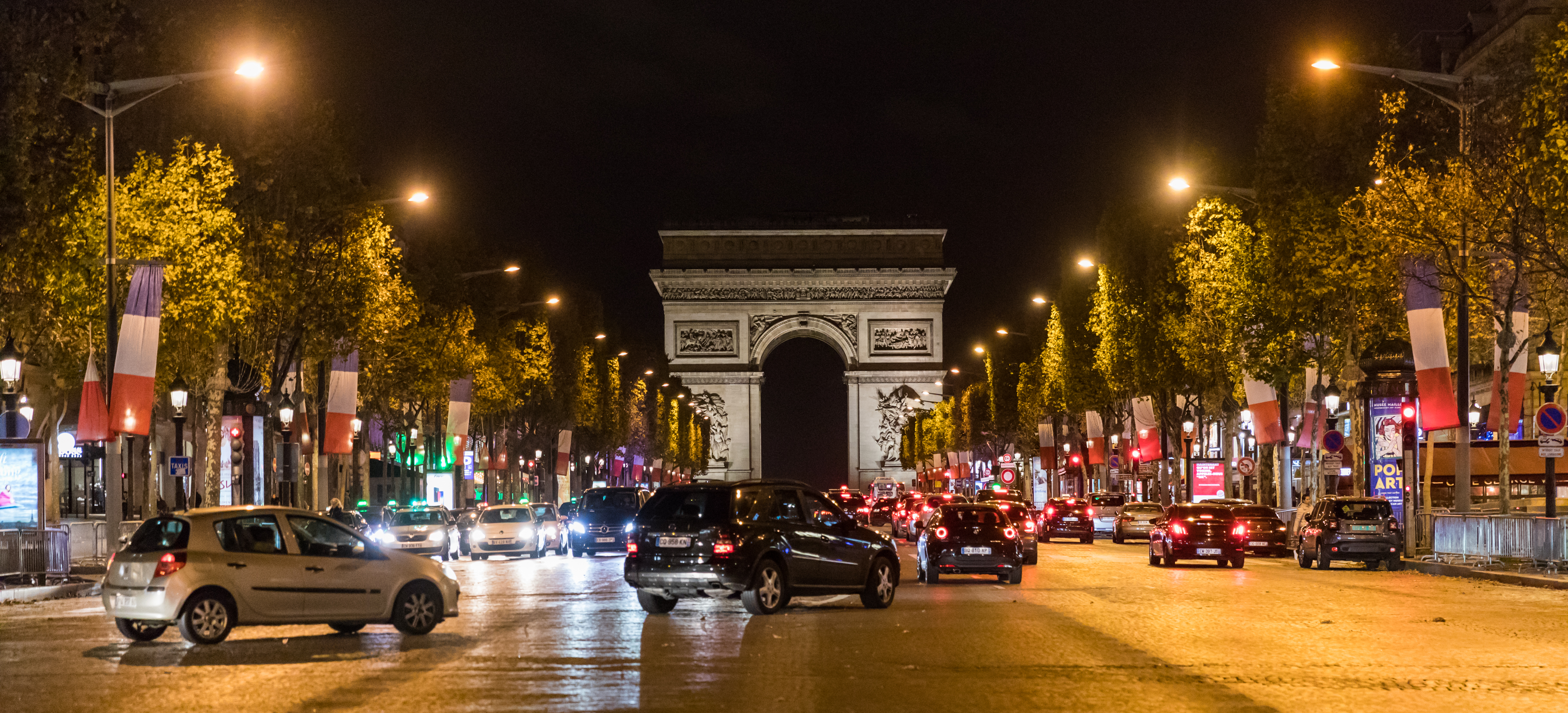
View of the Avenue des Champs-Elysées at night

At the beginning of 2021, the Mayor of Paris, Anne Hidalgo, announced that the city would transform the Champs-Élysées into an "extraordinary garden" which will reduce the space for auto traffic by half, add more pedestrian space, and create "tunnels of trees" for improved air quality. A walkway will connect over 200 acres of green space stretching between the Arc de Triomphe, the Place de la Concorde, and the Tuileries Gardens. The city intends to adopt the plans formulated by the Champs-Élysées Committee, which has been campaigning for a redesign of the avenue since 2018 and which held a public consultation as to what the redesign should include. The plans are meant to make the avenue more "ecological, desirable and inclusive," and will cost an estimated €250 million. It will include a redesign of the Place de la Concorde as well. The work did not begin in earnest until after the 2024 Summer Olympics held in Paris; the goal is to complete the project by 2030.

== See also ==
- Axe historique
- Bastille Day Military Parade
- Jardin des Champs-Élysées
- List of leading shopping streets and districts by city
