= Shandong Ruyi =

Chinese clothing company

Shandong Ruyi Technology Group Co., Ltd
- Trade name: Shandong Ruyi Woolen Garment Group Co., Ltd.
- Native name: 山东如意科技集团
- Formerly: Shandong Jining Woolen Mill
- Traded as: SZSE: 002193
- Industry: Textiles and clothing
- Founded: 1972 in China
- Headquarters: Jining, China
- Key people: Yafu Qiu (chair)
- Brands: Aquascutum, Renown Inc.
- Parent: Jining Ruyi Investment Co., Ltd.
- Website: chinaruyi.com

Shandong Ruyi Technology Group Co., Ltd is a Chinese textiles and clothing company. Founded in 1972 in Jining, China, it is a subsidiary of Jining Ruyi Investment Co., Ltd. As of 2017, Ruyi Group was the largest textile manufacturer in China. It owns or part-owns brands including Aquascutum, and Renown Inc. and has expressed ambitions to become the Chinese equivalent of LVMH.

== History ==
=== 1972–2000 ===
The company was founded in 1972, and was formerly known as Shandong Jining Woolen Mill, and is based in Jining, China. It is a subsidiary of Jining Ruyi Investment Co., Ltd. Qiu Yafu became vice president in late 1992 of Shandong Ruyi Woolen Textiles Group Co Ltd, and president in late 1996; in late 1997 he became chairman and president, roles he held until 2002.

=== 2001–2016 ===
Shandong Ruyi was founded as is in 2001. Qiu Yafu was chairman and president of Shandong Ruyi Science & Technology Group from August 2002 until August 2008, when he became only chairman. He is also currently president of Shandong Ruyi Woolen Textiles Group Co Ltd. In 2010, it purchased a 41 percent stake in Renown Inc., a Japanese apparel maker, for $36.8 million, becoming its largest stakeholder.

As of 2016, it also owned Hong Kong-based menswear group Trinity Ltd which was purchased for $283.88 million. In December 2016, Aquascutum, a British luxury clothing manufacturer, was due to be sold for $120m (£97m) to two buyers, one of which was Shandong Ruyi. It was sold to Shandong Ruyi for $117 million.

As of 2016, Shandong Ruyi owned the French company SMCP Group, the parent company of fashion brands Sandro Paris, Maje, and Claudie Pierlot. It purchased the majority stake in SMCP in 2016 for £1.15 billion after six months of negotiations. SMCP CEO Daniel Lalonde said that the investment would fund SMCP's growth overseas, particularly in Asia. SMCP was then taken public in 2017, with Shandong Ruyi maintaining its stake.

=== 2017–2020 ===
In November 2017, the company offered to buy a 54% controlling stake of menswear supplier Bagir for $16.5 million, due to complete on 31 August 2018. In February 2018, Shandong Ruyi acquired a majority stake in the Swiss luxury fashion brand Bally from its parent company JAB Holding Company for an undisclosed sum. The closing of the operation is still suspended, however, since more than one year. At the time, Yafu Qiu was chairman of Shandong Ruyi Group. As of February 2018, British billionaire Sir Philip Green was considering selling his Arcadia company to Shandong Ruyi. As of 2017, Ruyi Group was the largest textile manufacturer in China. As of 2018, it was also in the top 20 in terms of revenues for luxury fashion groups.

In 2019, it acquired Invista's Apparels & Advanced Textiles business for an undisclosed amount said to exceed $2 billion, adding products such as Lycra and Coolmax to its portfolio. The acquired business operates under the name of The Lycra Company. However, in 2022 ownership of The Lycra Company was transferred to an equity group that provided funds for its acquisition, after Shandong Ruyi defaulted on loan repayment terms.

In 2020 Ruyi struggled because of debt and the COVID-19 pandemic.

== Operations ==
As of 2018, most of its business was concentrated in the clothing industrial chain, including supplying yarn, fabric, raw materials, dying, weaving, sewing and production. The company has operations in China, Japan, Australia, New Zealand, India, Pakistan, the United Kingdom, Germany, and Italy. In 2017, Shandong Ruyi Technology Group said it would renovate a former television factory in Arkansas into its first facility in North America, in a $410 million project. It was expected that Ruyi would absorb "almost all the cotton produced by Arkansas annually."
