= Jardins des Champs-Élysées =

Urban park in Paris, France

Coordinates: 48.867°N 2.315°E

Plan of the Jardins des Champs-Élysées

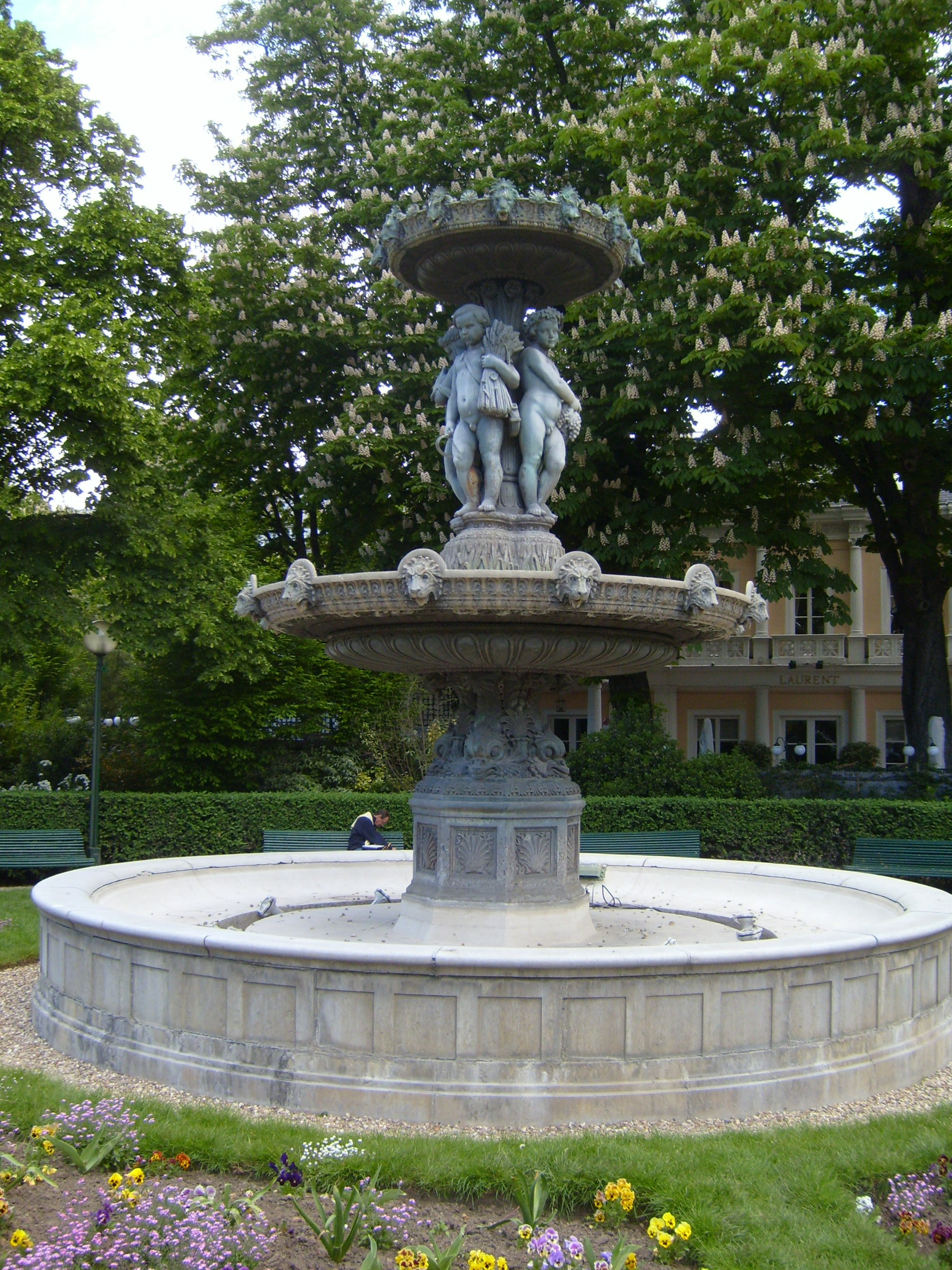
The Fontaine du Cirque (1840) in the Jardins des Champs-Élysées

The Jardins des Champs-Élysées is a public park located in the 8th arrondissement of Paris. It occupies 13.7 hectares, and is located on both sides of the Avenue des Champs-Élysées between the Place de la Concorde on the east and the Rond-point des Champs-Élysées on the west and between Avenue Gabriel to the north and the Seine to the south. It includes within its boundaries the Grand Palais and the Petit Palais, as well as a theater and other buildings. It was one of the first parks in the city, laid out by André Le Notre in 1667, and was the site of the Paris International Exposition of 1855 and an important part of the Paris Universal Exposition of 1900, for which the Grand Palais and Petit Palais were created.

== History ==
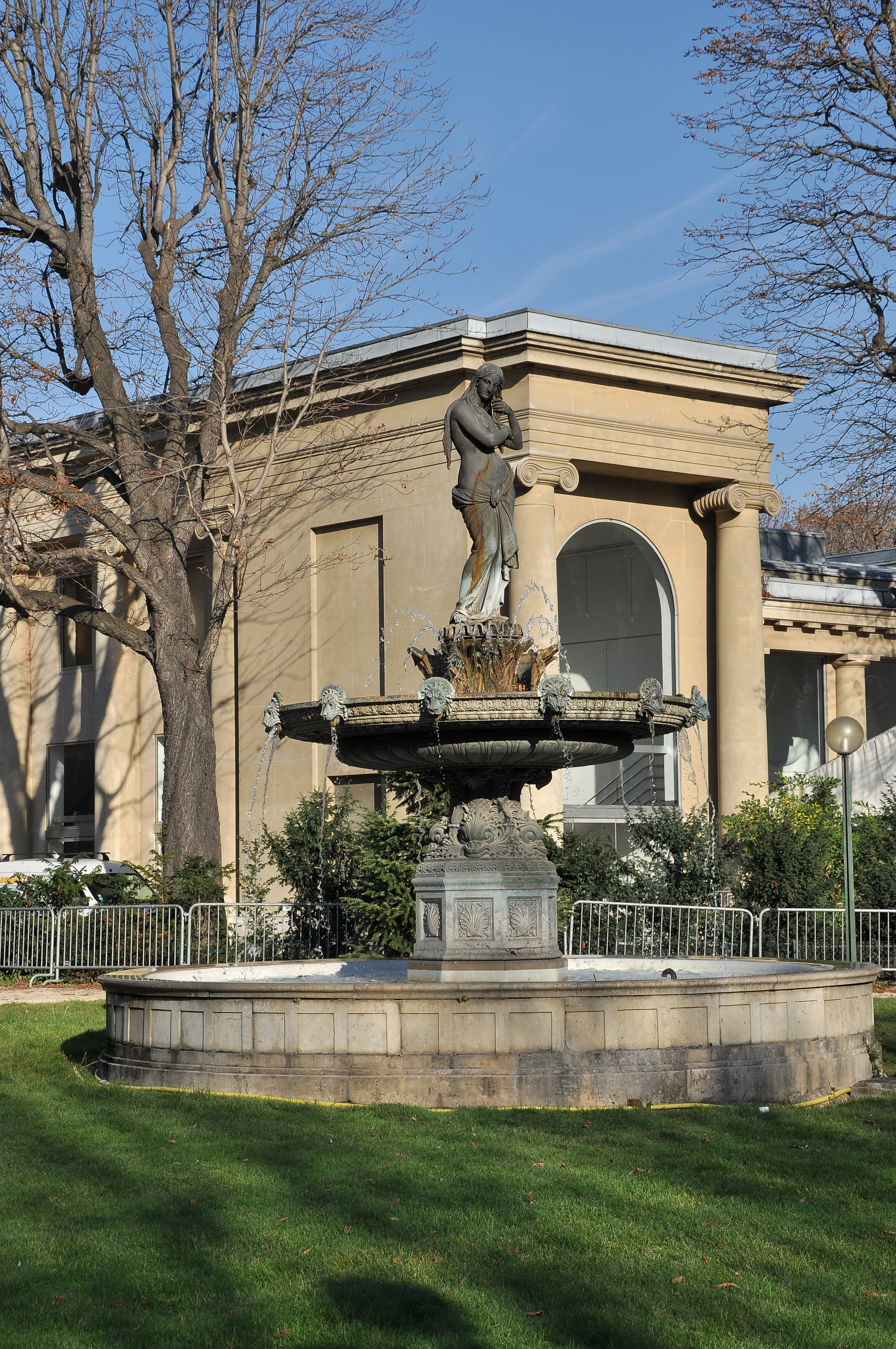
The Fontaine des Ambassadeurs, also known as the Fountain of Venus, one of the three original monumental fountains remaining from the reconstruction of the garden by Jacques Ignace Hittorff in 1840.

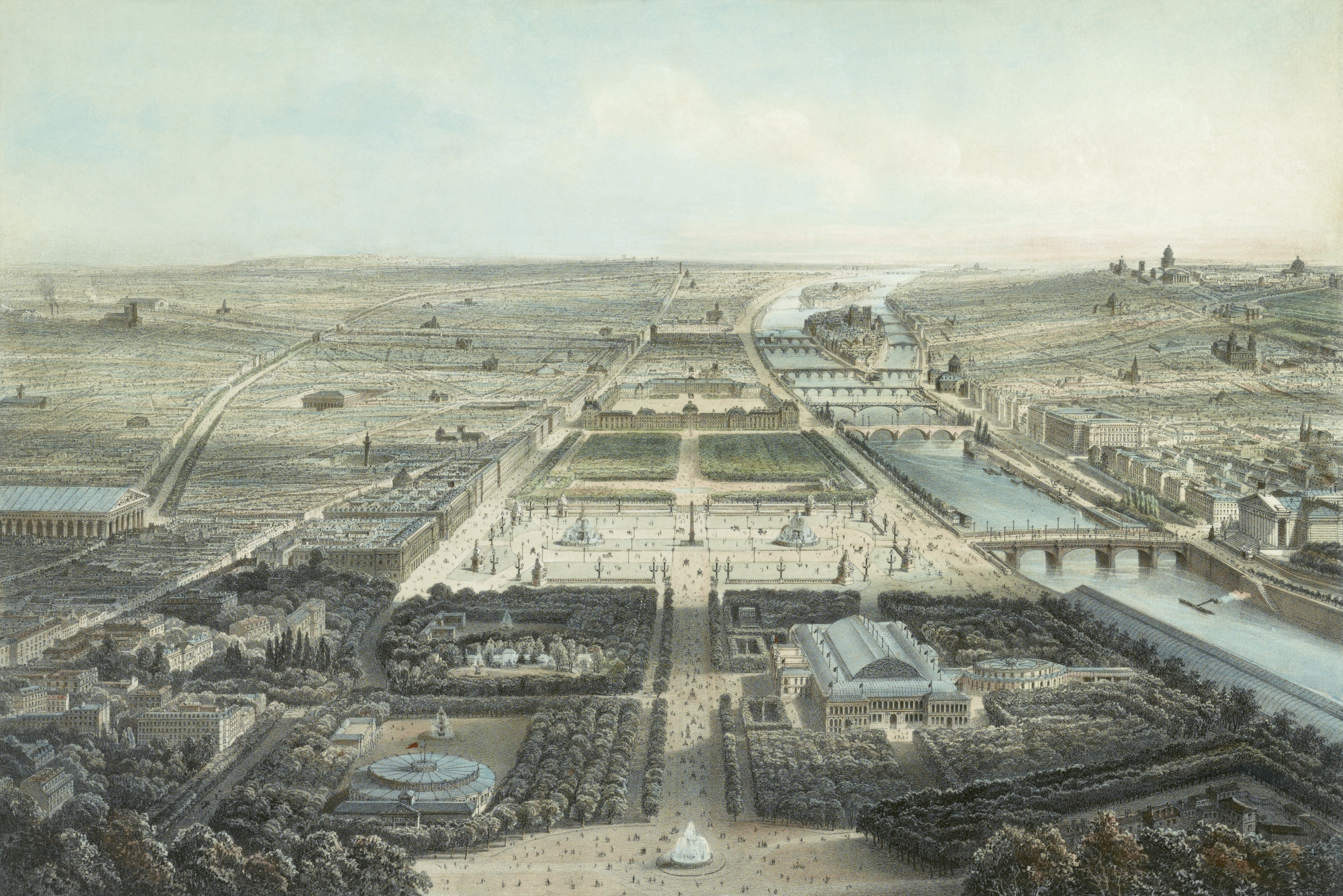
A view of the Jardins des Champs-Élysées in the 1860s, looking from the Rond-Point toward the Place de la Concorde

The gardens were originally designed in 1667 by André Le Notre as an extension of the Jardin des Tuileries, the gardens of the Tuileries Palace. Le Notre planned a wide promenade between the palace and the modern Rond Point, lined with two rows of elm trees on either side, and flowerbeds in the symmetrical style of the French formal garden. The garden was remade in 1765 in the same style by Abel François Poisson, the marquis de Marigny, the brother of Madame de Pompadour and Director-General of the King's Buildings. The avenue itself was extended as far as Place d'Etoile in 1710, and then extended again in 1774 by Marigny as far as the modern porte Maillot.

Following the French Revolution, two equestrian statues, made in 1745 by Nicolas and Tuillaume Coustou, were transferred from the former royal palace at Marly-le-Roi and placed at the beginning of the boulevard and park. After the downfall of Napoleon and the restoration of the French monarchy, the gardens had to be replanted, because the occupation armies of the Russians, English and Prussians had camped in the park and used the trees for firewood.

In 1834, under King Louis Philippe, the architect Jacques Ignace Hittorff was commissioned to redesign the Place de la Concorde and the gardens of the Champs-Élysées. He kept the formal gardens and flowerbeds essentially intact, but turned the garden into a sort of outdoor amusement park, with a summer garden café, the Alcazar d'eté, two restaurants, the Ledoyen and the restaurant de l'Horloge; a theater, the Lacaze; the Panorama, built in 1839, where large historical paintings were displayed, and the cirque d'eté (1841), a large hall for popular theater, musical and circus performances. He also placed several ornamental fountains around the park, of which three are still in place.

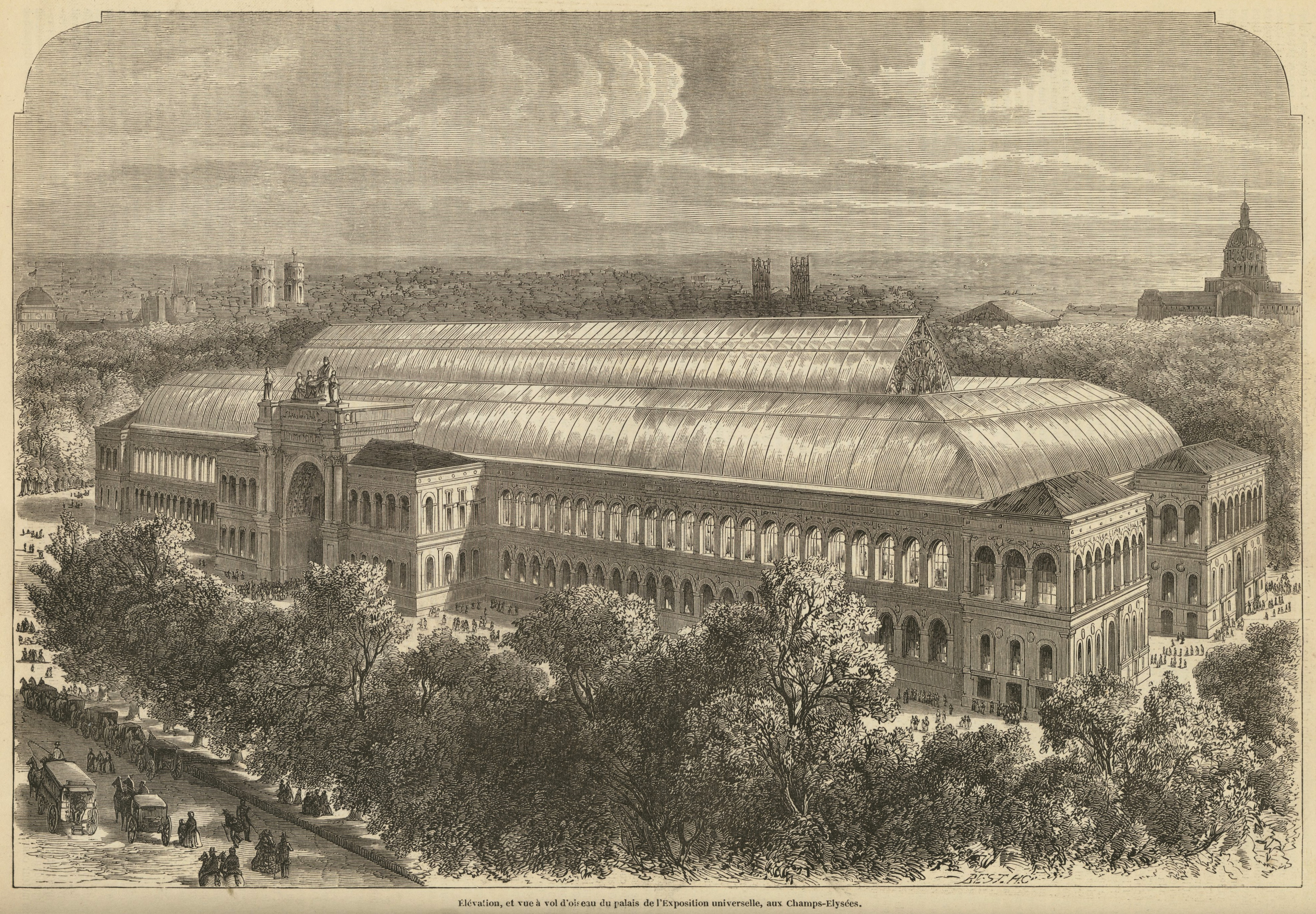
The Palace of Industry, built for the 1855 Paris Exposition, was designed to be bigger than The Crystal Palace in London. It stood until 1897, when it was demolished to make room for the Grand Palais.

In 1855 Emperor Napoleon III chose the park as the site of the first great international exposition to be held in Paris, the Exposition Universelle. The park was the location of the Palace of Industry, a giant exhibit hall which covered thirty thousand square meters, where the Grand Palais is today.

In 1858, following the Exposition, the Emperor's prefect of Paris, Georges-Eugène Haussmann, had the gardens transformed from a formal French garden into a picturesque English style garden, with groves of trees, flowerbeds and winding paths. The rows of elm trees, which were in poor health, were replaced by rows of chestnut trees.

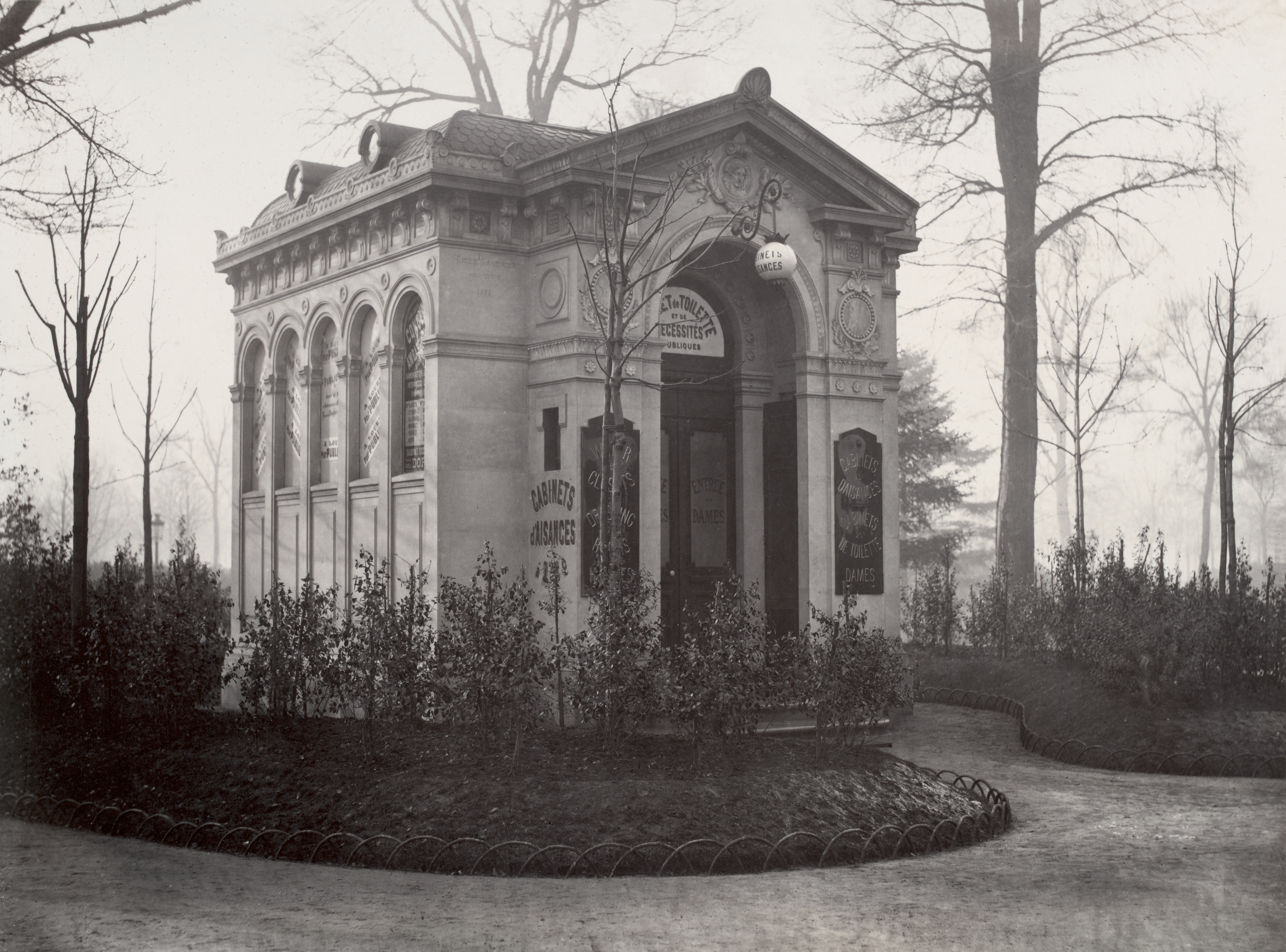
A new "Chalet of Necessity" or public toilet in the Parc des Champs-Élysées photographed by Charles Marville in 1865.

The garden was one of the first parks in Paris to have monumental and sanitary public toilets. They were designed especially for the park by city architect Gabriel Davioud, and were called Chalets de Toilette et de Necessités publiques, or "chalets of toilets and public necessities" One was photographed by pioneer urban photographer Charles Marville in 1865.

The park served again as an exposition site during the Universal Exposition of 1900; it became the home of the Grand Palais and Petit Palais. It also became the home of a new panorama theater, designed by Gabriel Davioud, the chief architect of Napoleon III, in 1858, to display large 360-degree historical paintings. That building became the Palais de Glace, or ice palace, in 1893, and then, after World War II, became a dramatic theater, the Théatre du Rond-Point, which specialized in new French plays. The Théatre Marigny was built by Charles Garnier, architect of the Paris Opera, in 1883, was also originally designed to display panorama paintings. It was turned into a musical theater in 1894.

The park played a memorable role in French literature; in the novels of Marcel Proust, it was the place where the young narrator met with his first love, Gilberte.

== Description ==
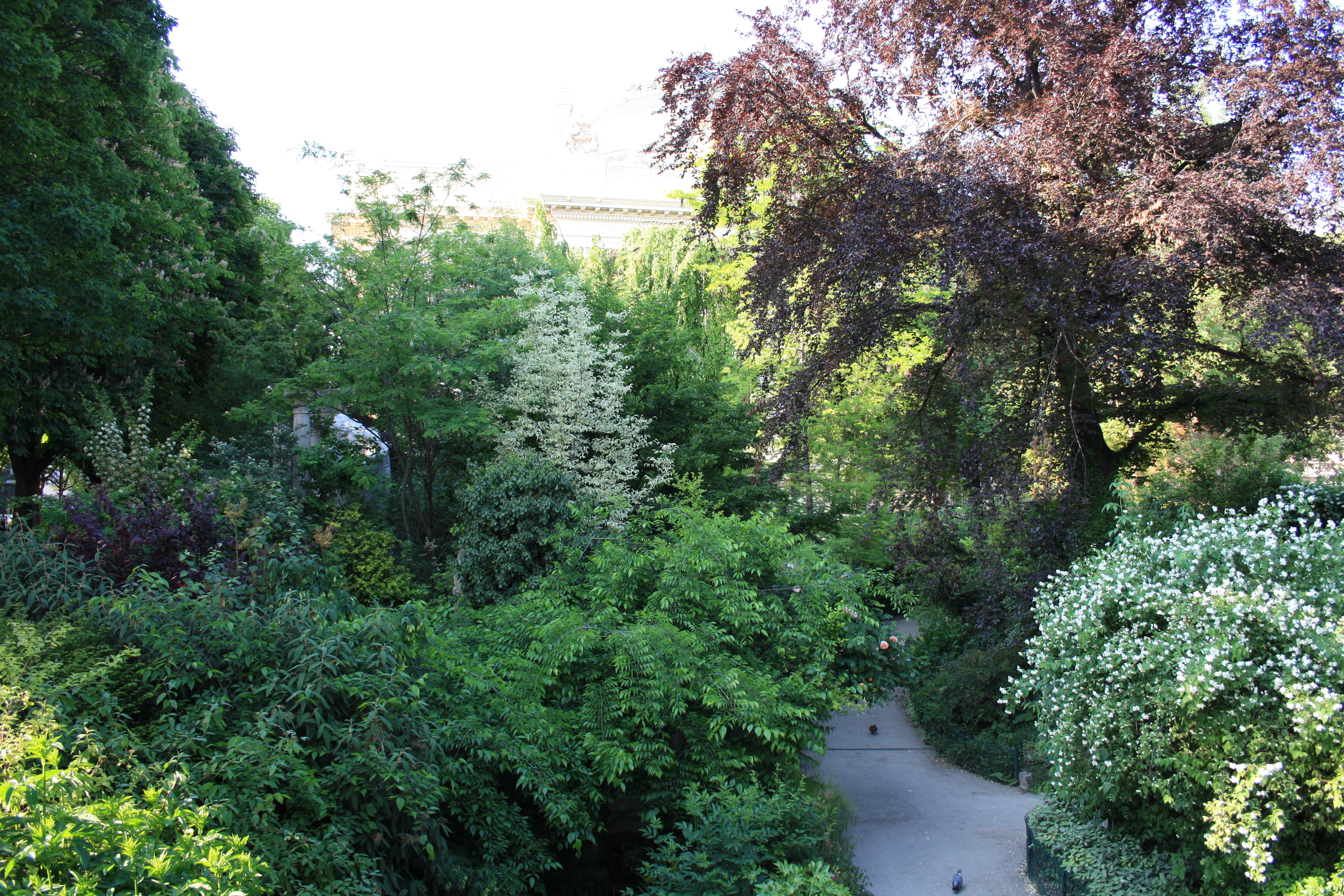
The Jardin de la Vallée Suisse, a quiet corner in the southwest corner of the park

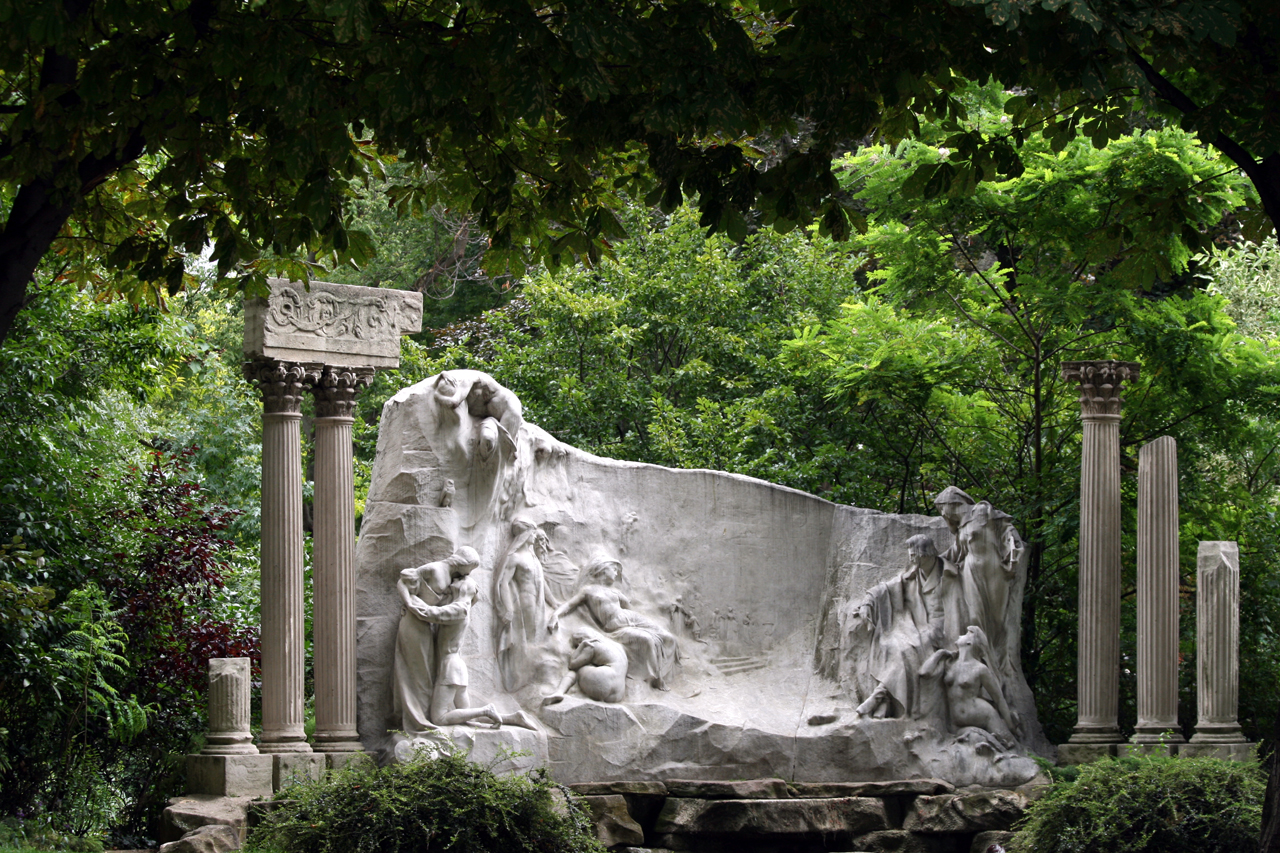
"The dream of the poet", (1910) a monument to the French poet Alfred de Musset in the Vallée Suisse garden.

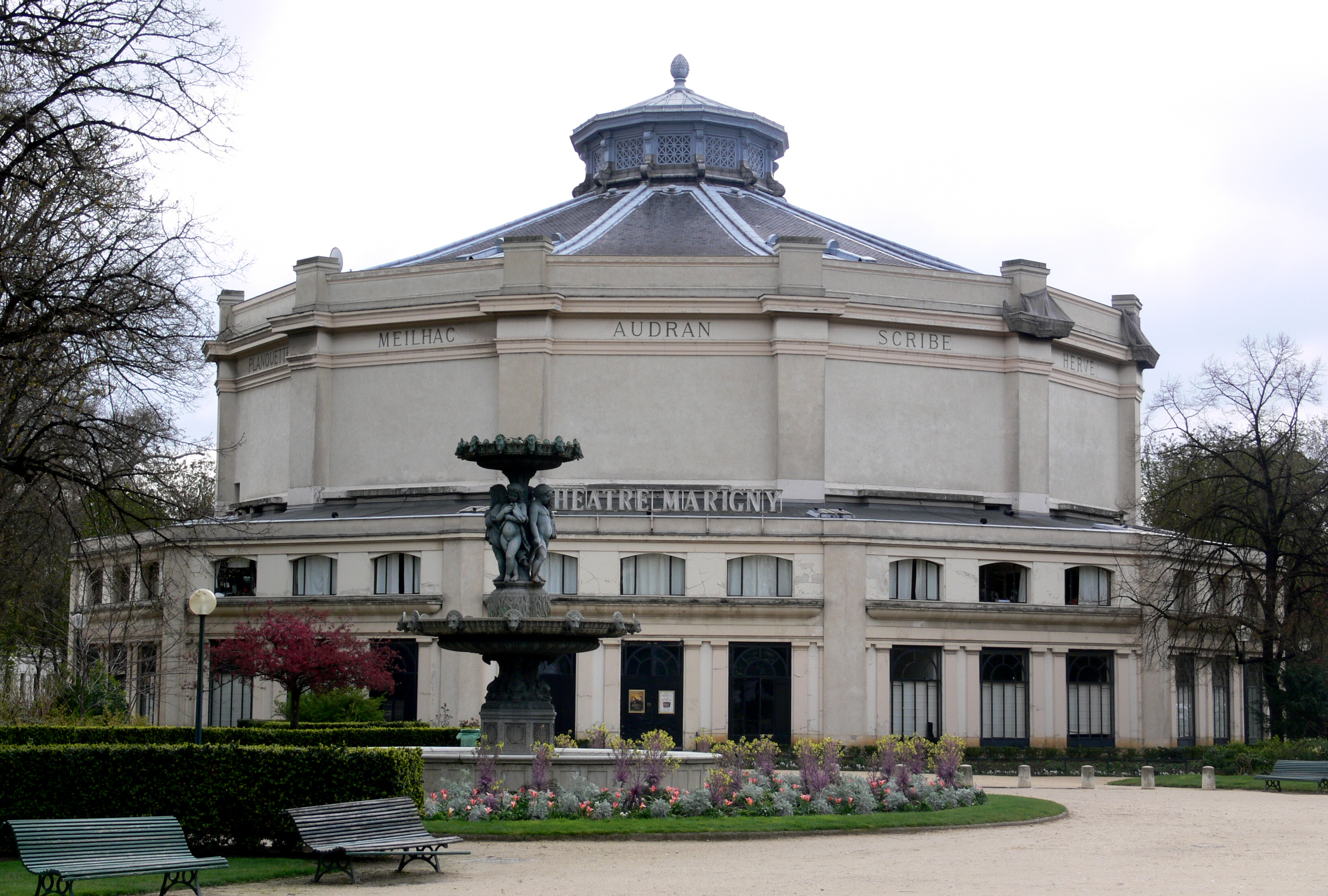
The Theatre Marigny, designed in 1883 by Charles Garnier, architect of the Paris Opera.

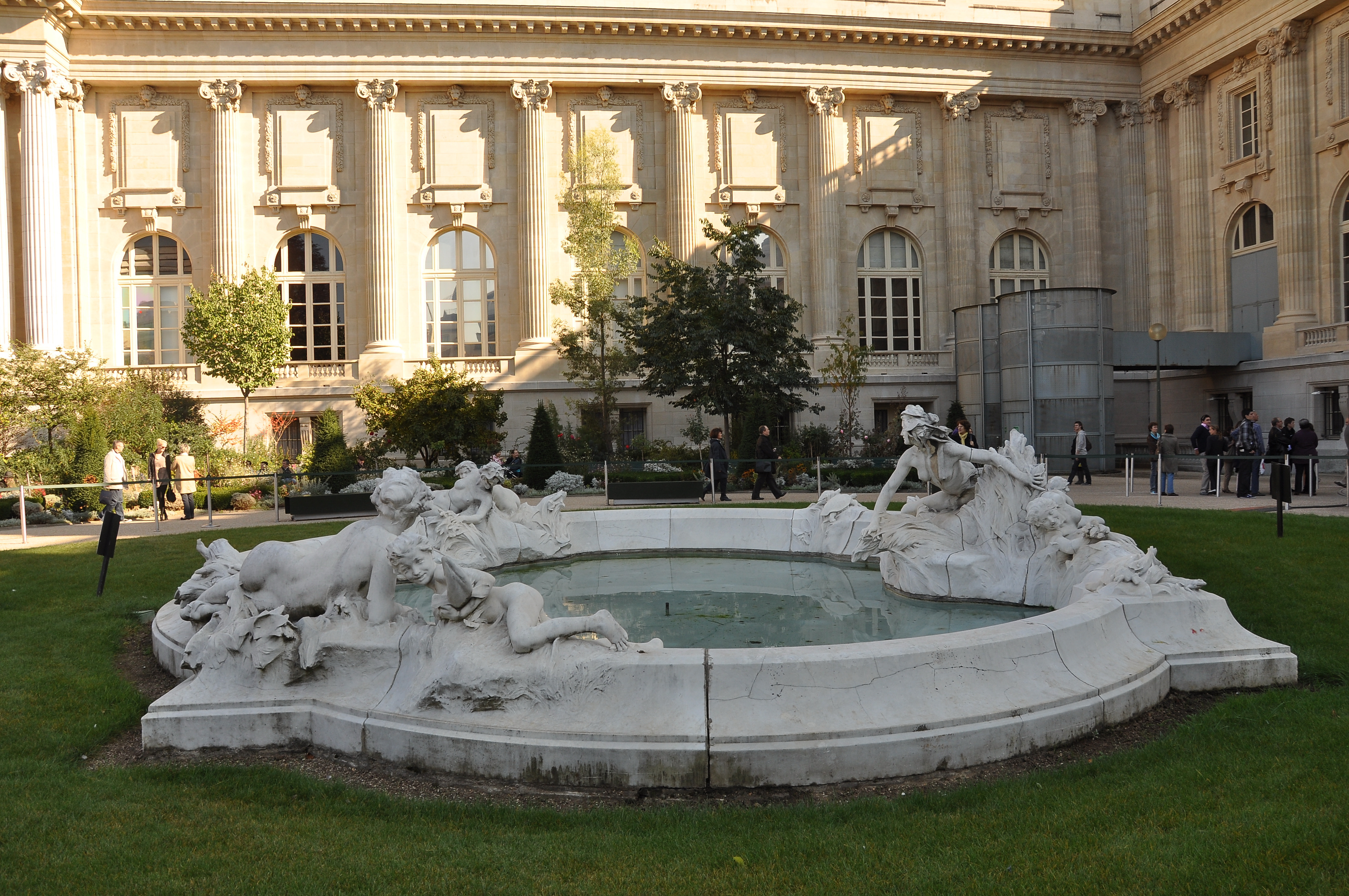
The fountain of the water mirror, in the Square Jean Perrin.

The modern park is divided by one of the busiest boulevards in Paris, the Champs-Élysées, but it still manages to provide quiet corners for calm, reflection and appreciation of nature. The most remote and quiet corner of the park lies in the southwest, along Avenue Franklin D. Roosevelt and between the Grand Palais and the Cours-la-Reine. This section of the park is called the Vallée Suisse, or Swiss valley, and features a stream which passes under a weeping willow tree, and offers a selection of old and exotic trees.

Another quiet small garden with a fountain, Square Jean Perrin is found just north of the Grand Palais and the Palais de la Decouverte, next to Avenue du General Eisenhower.

The buildings within the park include:

- The Théâtre du Rond-Point. Originally built as the National Panorama to display large-scale historical paintings by architect Gabriel Davioud, it became the Palais de Glace, or ice palace, in 1893, then a dramatic theater after World War II.
- The Grand Palais and Palais de la Decouverte, within the same building
- The Petit Palais
- The Restaurant Ledoyen
- The Restaurant Laurent
- The Theatre Marigny, built in 1883 by architect Charles Garnier to display large-scale historical panorama paintings, then converted to a musical theater in 1894.
- The Espace Cardin, a theater opened in 1971.

The park contains many statues and monuments, including a statue to the poet/writer Alfred de Musset by Alphonse Moncel (1910); to Alphonse Daudet, by Saint-Marceaux (1902); to the explorer Jacques Cartier; to Georges Clemenceau, by François Cogné (1932); to Jean Moulin by Georges Jeanclos (1984); to Georges Pompidou by Louis Derbré (1984). and to Winston Churchill and Charles DeGaulle. One of the most recent monuments in the park is a statue of fashion designer Pierre Cardin by the sculptor Andrei Kovalchuk, placed near the Carré des Ambassadeurs in 2011.
