= Renown (company) =

Japanese clothing and textile company

Renown Incorporated
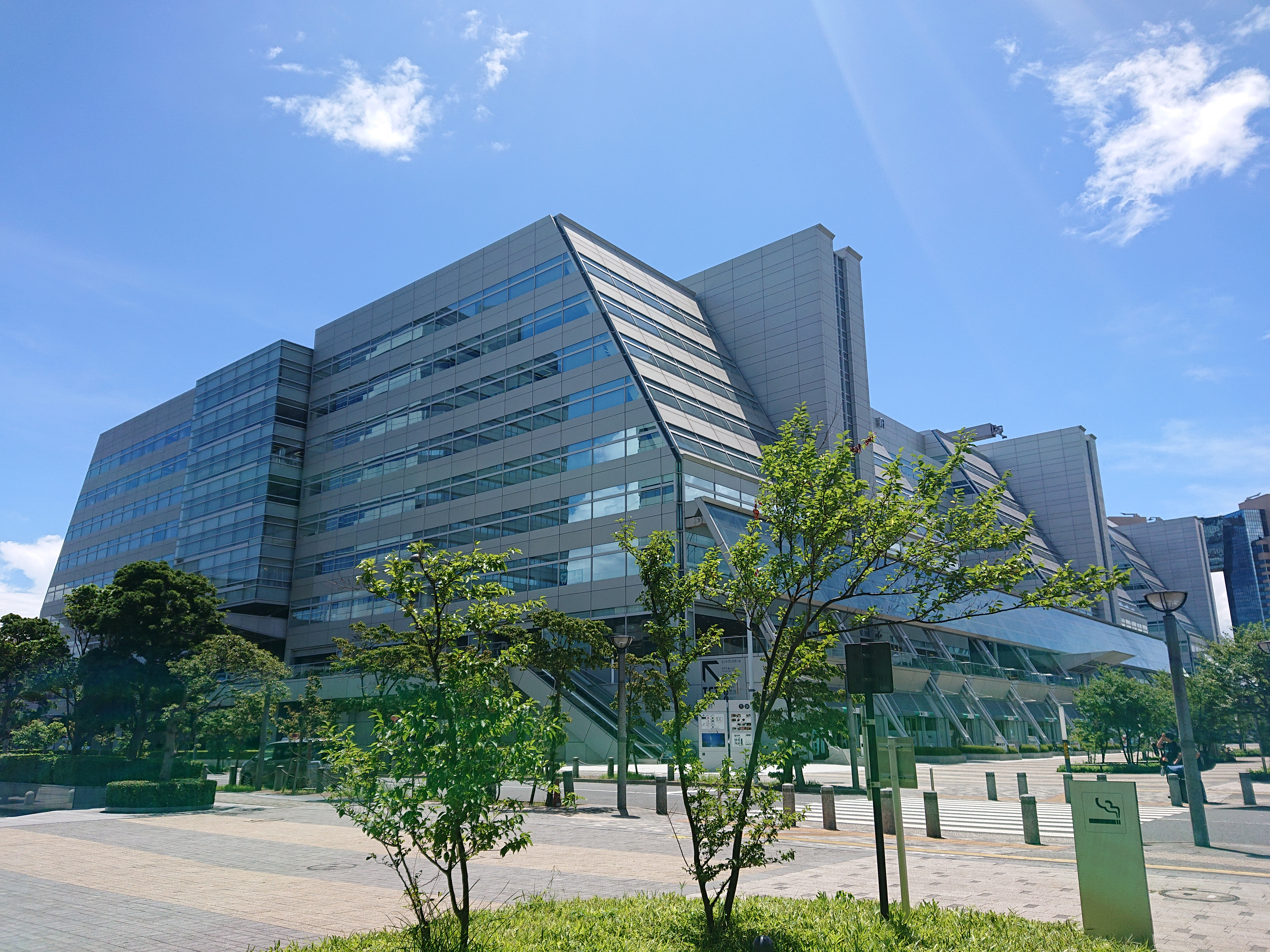
- Headquarters
- Trade name: Renown Inc.
- Type: Corporation
- Traded as: TYO: 3606
- Founded: September 25, 1947
- Defunct: May 15, 2020
- Headquarters: Shinagawa, Tokyo, Japan
- Area served: Japan
- Products: Textiles and apparel
- Owner: China Shandong Ruyi (41%)
- Website: renown.com

Renown Incorporated (Japanese: 株式会社 レナウン; Kabushiki gaisha Renaun) was a Japanese company mainly involved in textile and clothing production.

On May 15, 2020, Renown filed for bankruptcy after it struggled to collect substantial debts owed to them by their Chinese owner and the COVID-19 pandemic hit sales sharply.

== Operations ==
Renown also operates retail stores throughout the world. It also has interests in store design, real estate, and food processing. As of 2009, the company had 51 subsidiaries and six associated companies.

== Motorsport ==
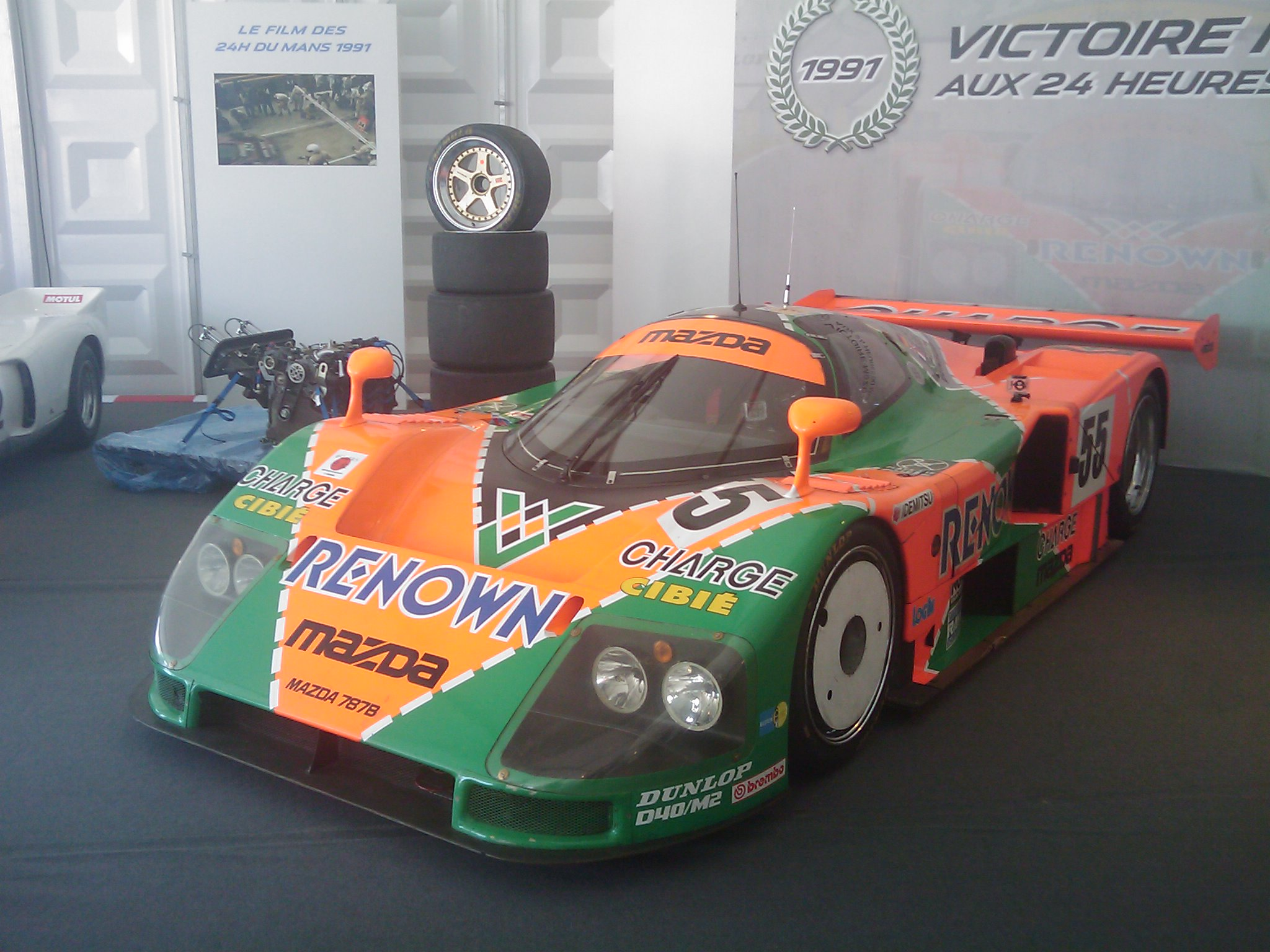
Mazda 787B at Le Mans in 2011.

Renown is perhaps best known outside of their home country for having sponsored Mazda from the late 1980s to the early 1990s, with their branding (as well as that of their sportswear brand, Charge) appearing on the 1991 Le Mans-winning Mazda 787B.
