= SMCP Group =

French fashion group

SMCP S.A.
- Company type: Public (Société Anonyme)
- Traded as: Euronext Paris: EN; CAC Small
- Industry: Fashion
- Predecessors: Sandro; Maje; Claudie Pierlot
- Founded: 2010; 16 years ago in Paris, France
- Founder: Évelyne Chetrite; Judith Milgrom
- Headquarters: 49, rue Etienne Marcel, Paris, France
- Number of locations: 1,684 (2021)
- Area served: Worldwide
- Key people: Isabelle Guichot (CEO); Patricia Huyghues Despointes (CFO)
- Products: Clothing; Fashion accessories; Footwear
- Revenue: ▲€1.039 billion (2021)
- Operating income: ▲€95.3 million (2021)
- Net income: ▲€23.6 million (2021)
- Total assets: ▲€2.413 billion (2021)
- Total equity: ▲€1.122 billion (2021)
- Owner: Blackrock; The Carlyle Group
- Number of employees: 6000 (2021)
- Subsidiaries: List of subsidiaries
- Website: www.smcp.com

SMCP Group, commonly known as SMCP, is a French holding company specializing in accessible luxury ready-to-wear, headquartered in Paris. The company was formed in 2010 through the merger of Sandro, Maje, and Claudie Pierlot. SMCP operates over 1,600 points of sale, including boutiques, flagships, and within high-end department stores, in 43 countries. Isabelle Guichot has been the CEO of SMCP since August 2021. De Fursac is also one of its subsidiaries.

== History ==
=== Founding ===
Prior to the founding of SMCP Group, Sandro, Maje, and Claudie Pierlot operated independently in the growing accessible luxury fashion niche in France. Following the acquisition of Claudie Pierlot's eponymous label by sisters Évelyne Chetrite of Sandro and Judith Milgrom of Maje in 2009, Pierlot lost her long battle with cancer and died, leaving her label's future to the two sisters. In 2010, SMCP S.A. was formed through the merger of Sandro, Maje, and Claudie Pierlot.

=== Under private equity's control ===
In September 2010, L Capital, the private equity arm of French luxury conglomerate LVMH, purchased a 51 percent stake in SMCP Group. The investment provided SMCP access to L Capital and LVMH's assets in the textile sector and experience working with rapidly expanding, formerly family-run brands. In October 12, 2011, a Maje boutique opened in New York City, becoming the first SMCP store to open in the U.S. and marking the beginning of a period of rapid worldwide brick and mortar expansion.

In March 2013, American private-equity firm KKR acquired a 65 percent stake in SMCP Group from L Capital and Florac for an estimated 650 million euros, becoming its majority owner. The company grew steadily over the years and saw its revenue jumped 32 percent in the first half of 2015 amid a rapidly growing accessible luxury market.

=== Acquisition by Shandong Ruyi ===
In April 2016, Chinese textile conglomerate Shandong Ruyi acquired a controlling interest in SMCP from KKR for an estimated 1.3 billion euros to take advantage of China's growing middle class and in hopes of one day becoming "a global leader in accessible luxury." SMCP Group roughly doubled in size from 2013 to 2016. The company saw a 19.2 percent growth in revenue in the first half of 2016, including an "explosive" 51 percent in Greater China, under new majority Chinese ownership.

SMCP Group went public in October 2017 with IPO at 22 euros per share, giving the company a market capitalization of around 1.7 billion euros. It was the second-largest IPO on the Paris stock market in 2017.

In June 2019, SMCP acquired De Fursac, a French luxury menswear brand.

Claudie Pierlot, a subsidiary of SMCP, became the last brand in the group to ban the use of fur in its collection in spring 2020. Since then, SMCP has been a fur-free fashion group.

Due to the COVID-19 pandemic, the group reported a 31 percent decrease in revenue and a loss of 88.5 million euros in the first half of 2020. It quickly recovered and reported a profit of 600,000 euros or an increase of 89 million euros in the first half of 2021 compared to the same period in 2020.

=== Recent developments ===
In October 2021, SMCP's majority shareholder European TopSoho, a Luxembourg-based subsidiary of Shandong Ruyi, defaulted on 250 million euros worth of bonds, angering institutional shareholders Blackrock and the Carlyle Group. A 29 percent share of SMCP was taken over and sold by its creditors. In January 2022, Blackrock, the Carlyle Group, and other investors joined forces under GLAS, a trustee, and voted to dismiss five board members representing the former majority owner of the company, European TopSoho.

Isabelle Guichot, former CEO of Balenciaga and Maje, was named CEO of the group in 2021 to replace Daniel Lalonde upon his resignation.

In 2023, SMCP which is already present in 47 countries, announced its entry to the Indian market, where it will open its first stores in 2024, through a partnership with the Reliance Brands Limited (RBL) group.

In April 2024, Maje, SMCP's subsidiary, formed a partnership with the after-sales start-up, Save Your Wardrobe, to develop its clothing repair service.
