= Sandro Paris =

French clothing company

Sandro Andy S.A.S
- Trade name: Sandro Paris
- Company type: Subsidiary (S.A.S)
- Industry: Fashion
- Founded: 1984; 41 years ago in Paris, France
- Founder: Évelyne Chetrite
- Headquarters: 150 du Boulevard Haussmann, Paris, France
- Number of locations: 745 (2021)
- Area served: Worldwide
- Key people: Évelyne Chetrite & Ilan Chetrite (Artistic Directors); Isabelle Allouch (CEO)
- Products: Clothing; fashion accessories; footwear
- Revenue: ▲€497.6 million (2021)
- Parent: SMCP Group
- Website: www.sandro-paris.com

Sandro Andy S.A.S, commonly known as Sandro Paris, is a French luxury ready-to-wear brand founded in 1984 by Évelyne Chetrite in Paris.

== History ==
Sandro was founded in 1984 by Évelyne Chetrite with the help of her husband as a premium contemporary brand positioned between luxury designer brands and mass market brands. Évelyne Chetrite has described the philosophy of the brand as "casual but always chic" and "sophisticated but cool."

It began as a womenswear brand before Ilan Chetrite, the son of founder Évelyne Chetrite, joined the company and launched Sandro Homme in 2008.

Sandro Homme's design was described by Wmagazine as "masculine but not at all macho" and "timeless but with a bit of edge."

Sandro's business model was exclusively wholesale until 2007 when it began opening stand-alone retail stores in Europe. The first Sandro boutique in the U.S. opened in 2011 in New York City. In 2023, Sandro has over 50 outlets in the United States.

Isabelle Allouch, a former Balenciaga executive before joining SMCP Group, was named CEO in 2019.

In 2021, Sandro launched its second-hand offer in France and later in other European countries like Germany, the Netherlands and Spain.

In December 2023, Sandro expanded its presence in the American market with the opening of a new store at the Westfield Topanga Shopping Center in Los Angeles.
