= Sophie Mallebranche =

French artist and textile designer (born 1976)

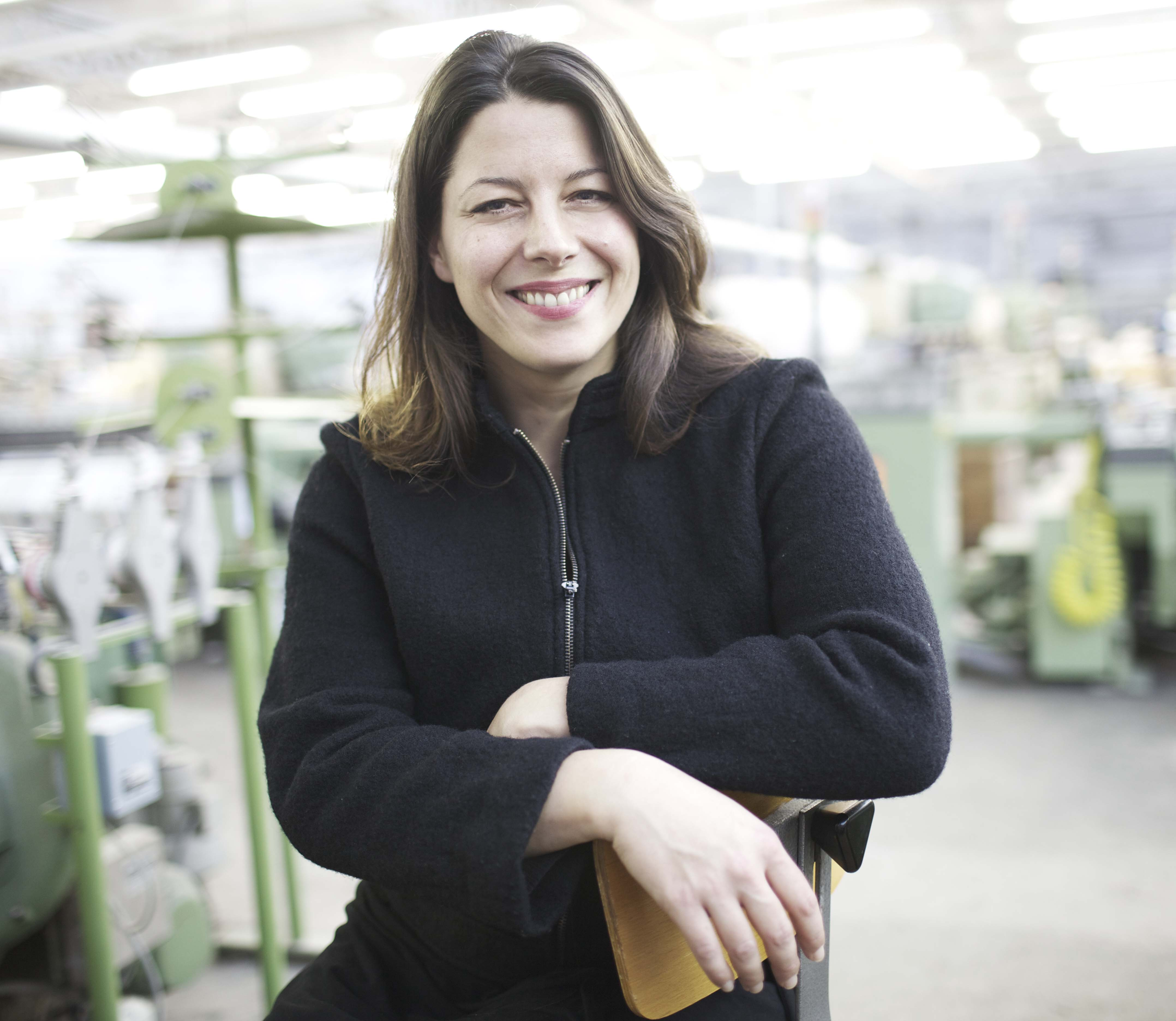
Sophie Mallebranche

Sophie Mallebranche (born 1976) is a French artist and textile designer known for her woven metal materials that mix fibers and industrial materials.

She is the creative director of Material Design Group, which produces and distributes her work.

Architects and designers of international renown, such as Peter Marino, Robert A. M. Stern, Tony Chi, Jacques Grange, Gensler, Rena Dumas, Yabu Pushelberg and Flanagan Lawrence have used her designs. She has collaborated with brands such as Hermès, Christian Dior, Chanel, Louis Vuitton, Richard Mille, Chaumet, Piaget, Mikimoto, and Guerlain. Her metal weaves have been awarded multiple times by design professionals for their innovative nature, and her creations adorn numerous flagships, hotels, and restaurants worldwide.

== Biography ==
Mallebranche was born 30 March 1976 in Honfleur, France. She graduated in 1998 from the École supérieure des arts appliqués Duperré in Paris. Mallebranche invented new methods of weaving to give the malleability and suppleness of textiles to the industrial materials she used. Her first woven metal materials attracted the attention of the interior designer, Andrée Putman, and the architect, Peter Marino. Mallebranche's went on to adorn Chanel's historic address on Rue Cambon in Paris along with the brand's building in Tokyo's Ginza neighborhood. She also created exclusive materials for Arcelor, Balenciaga, Laurent-Perrier, and the French crystal brand, Daum.

In 2004, selected by the French Ministry of Foreign Affairs and the Association française d'action artistique (AFAA), an artistic and cultural association, Mallebranche exhibited at Tokyo Designers Block, one of Japan's largest design events. In 2005, she conceived an exclusive material for Guerlain to decorate their flagship store at Galeries Lafayette Haussmann in Paris. She also created a 100% stainless steel material in large dimensions for the curtains at the Alain Ducasse restaurant at the Plaza Athénée in Paris. This creation was awarded an Étoile from the Observeur du Design in 2006. That same year, she received a Design Award in the Innovative Materials category at the International Contemporary Furniture Fair (ICFF) in New York.

To promote her work internationally, Mallebranche created the company Eh Oui with Evelyne Skorochod —a company she left in 2009—then registered the trademark Sophie Mallebranche®. She created Material Design Group with Guillaume Danset in 2010 to industrialize the production process and respond to increasing demand from interior architects. Backed by the Centre Francilien de l’Innovation, Oséo and Paris Pionnières, they developed a new industrial process, capable of weaving Mallebranche's designs while preserving the look of her handwoven work. They entered a partnership with Toiles de Mayenne, a 200-year-old textile manufacturer located in Fontaine-Daniel in France's Mayenne region to put this new process in place. Today, Material Design Group possesses its independent production site.

== Exhibitions ==
- 2004 : Contemplation, Tokyo Designers Block exhibition, Hanezawa Garden, Tokyo, Japan.
- 2010 : Contemplation II, musée des Tissus et des Arts décoratifs, Lyon, France.
- 2015 : Contemplation III, Hommage to Pierre Soulages, Fontaine-Daniel, France.
- 2022 : Artwork acquisitions to the musée des Tissus et des Arts décoratifs, Lyon, France.

== Awards and recognition ==
- 1999 : 1st Prize at Concours Museum Expression, Réunion des musées nationaux, Paris, France.
- 1999 : Lauréate de Talents à la carte, Maison & Objet, Paris.
- 2001 : Appel permanent VIA (Valorisation de l’innovation dans l’ameublement), Paris.
- 2004 : Aid from the Association française d’action artistique (AFAA) and the French Ministry of Foreign Affairs for artistic exhibition in Tokyo, Japan.
- 2006 : Design Award at the International Contemporary Furniture Fair (ICFF), Innovative Materials category, New York, US.
- 2006 : Étoile de l’Observeur du design, Paris, France.
- 2006 : Master in Creation of a Company awarded by the Senate, Paris, France.
- 2007 : Semi-finalist at the Academy Award, New York, US.

== Pedagogy ==
- 2003–09 : Professor of « Color-Material » at the École Supérieure d’Art et de Design (ESAD) in Reims, Art and Space section.
- 2007–09 : Pedagogical director at the École Bleue in Paris, France.
