= Sacha Lakic =

French designer

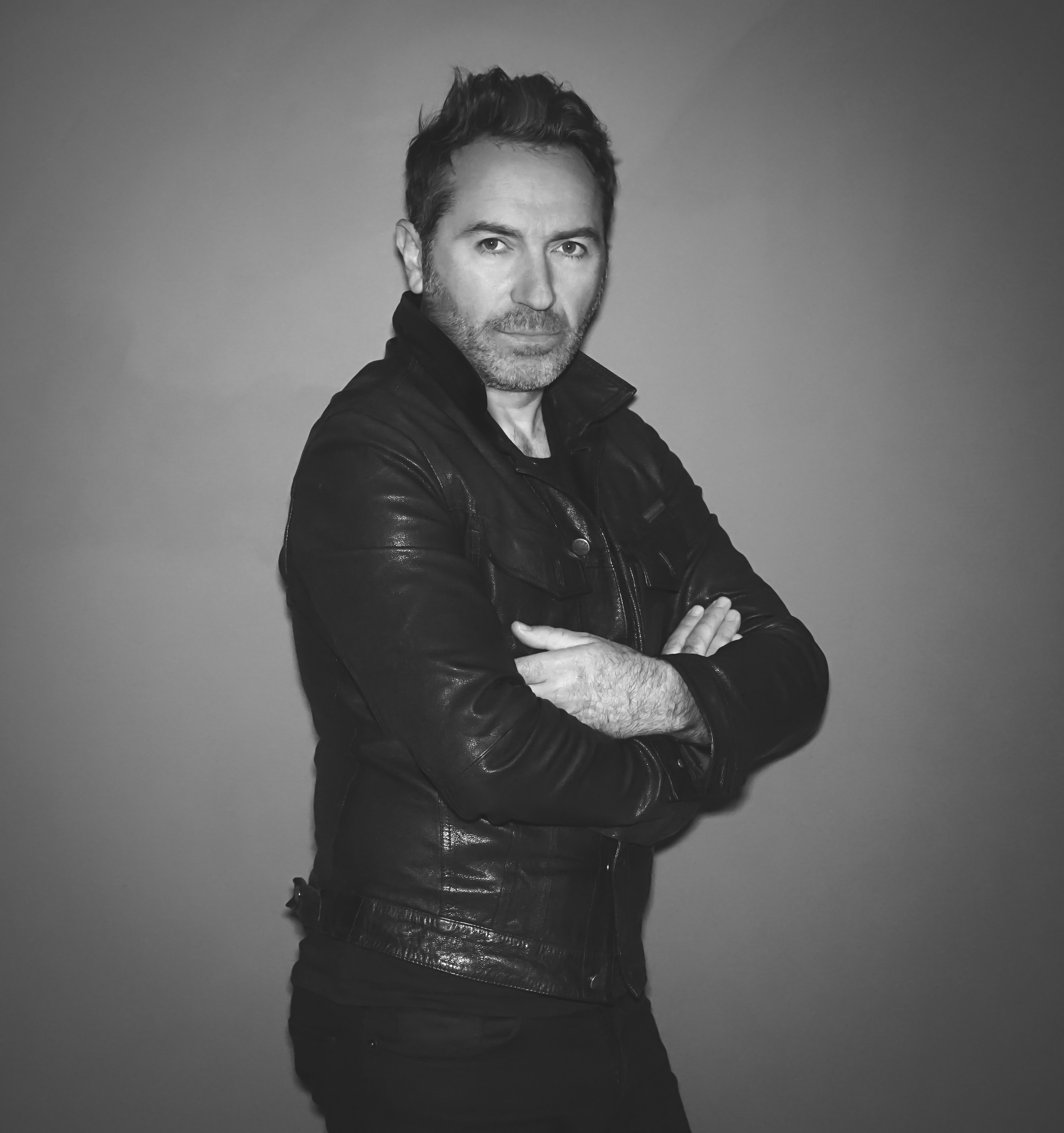
- Born: 1964 (age 61–62); Belgrade, Serbia
- Known for: Onda furniture line, Volage sports car, Bubble sofa, Eclectic mini car, Wattman motorcycle, Blacktrack Motors
- Website: http://www.lakic.com https://www.blacktrackmotors.com

Sacha Lakic (Serbian Cyrillic: Саша Лакић; born 1964) is a French automotive, furniture and product designer who has worked primarily in Paris and Luxembourg. Known for his "Onda" furniture line and Venturi electric cars, his work is described as embodying speed, future technologies, and an unadorned sculptural quality.

== Career ==
Lakic has a varied portfolio, having designed motorcycles, cars, furniture, watches, high-tech accessories, scooters and bicycles. He began an internship at Peugeot in 1985 and then in 1986 started working for vehicle designer Alain Carré. Two years later, Lakic became the head of motorcycle design at MBK-Yamaha, where he designed concept bikes, mass-produced models, and show bikes.

He has since designed watches for fashion designer Jean Colonna and furniture for French manufacturer David Lange. Lakic has also collaborated with various companies like Voxan and Peugeot, as well as being the exclusive designer for Venturi and Roche Bobois. In 2004, he designed the "Venturi Fétish", the first entirely electric sports car to be sold publicly. Lakic's 2006 solar-powered mini electric car, the "Venturi Eclectic" won several design prizes, like the "Good Design" award from the Chicago Athenaeum Museum of Architecture and Design. In 2007, the "Eclectic" was also voted by Time Magazine as being the 2nd most intelligent product after the iPhone. Incorporating the Michelin Active Wheel, his "Venturi Volage" sports car was introduced at the 2008 Paris Motor Show.

Lakic feels that automobiles should cater to a playful aspect, being more than just a mode of transport. He has also stated that the developmental process takes much longer than coming up with the initial car design.

According to Lakic, designing motorcycles is a bigger challenge then designing cars, which have an interior that can be hidden from view. His "Voxan Wattman" electric motorbike was launched in Paris at the 2013 Salon de la Moto. In 2015, he launched "Blacktrack Motors", his own custom café racer brand that combines vintage aesthetic with a modern design DNA.

Lakic's work on automotive projects has been translated into other fields. He tries to convey aerodynamic motion in his furniture pieces in the same way a still photographic image can, "This is what I'm doing with the furniture - multifunctional, frozen movement." In 1995, he became the official designer for Roche Bobois, a major French furniture company. Lakic won a "Compasso d'Oro" prize in Rome for his first line of Bobois furniture called "Onda". He also designed the "Synopsis" sofa, the "Speed Up" sideboard, and the "Scenario" sofa, as well as the more recent "Bubble" sofa which won a Luxembourg Design Gold award. Seen as resembling a cloud, the "Bubble" sofa debuted in 2014 and is made of both high-tech and traditional materials.

Disliking the general mess caused by high-tech equipment, Lakic designed a 2005 desk, part of the "Speed Up" series, that hid the computer cables. He also prefers to eliminate any extraneous elements so the furniture piece has a smooth sculptural quality. His style is generally described as being light without any busy details or clutter. Lakic has stated, "It is very important to let the space breathe because "emptiness" is a part of the design."

== Awards and honours ==
- 2015, Luxembourg Design awards, Product Design "Gold award" for the Roche Bobois Bubble sofa
- 2011, Berlin, Michelin Challenge Bibendum, "Best Design" award for the Venturi Volage
- 2009, Paris, GEO Magazine, "Prix de l'environnement" award for the Venturi Eclectic
- 2009, Paris, Festival Automobile International, "Prix spécial du festival" award for the Venturi Volage
- 2008, Chicago Athenaeum Museum of Architecture and Design, "Good Design Award" for the Venturi Eclectic
- 2002, Paris, Talents du luxe et de la création, "Talent de la séduction" award for the Venturi Fetish Concept
- 2000, Paris, Observeur du Design, "Etoile 2001" award for the Voxan Roadster
- 1996, Rome, "Compasso d'Oro" award for the Roche Bobois Onda Collection
- 1993, Paris, "Janus du design" award for the MBK Evolis

== Early life ==
Of Serbian descent, Lakic was born in Belgrade, Serbia and moved to Paris when he was a child. His father was a stylist and fashion designer, who worked for Givenchy, Nina Ricci, and Pierre Cardin. He taught his son about color, proportions, and a general design aesthetic. Lakic has had a love of cars and motorcycles since the age of ten, when he first saw a Ford Mustang on the street.
