= Martyrdom of Saint Denis of the Nativity =

Painting by Adrien-Gabriel Voisard-Margerie

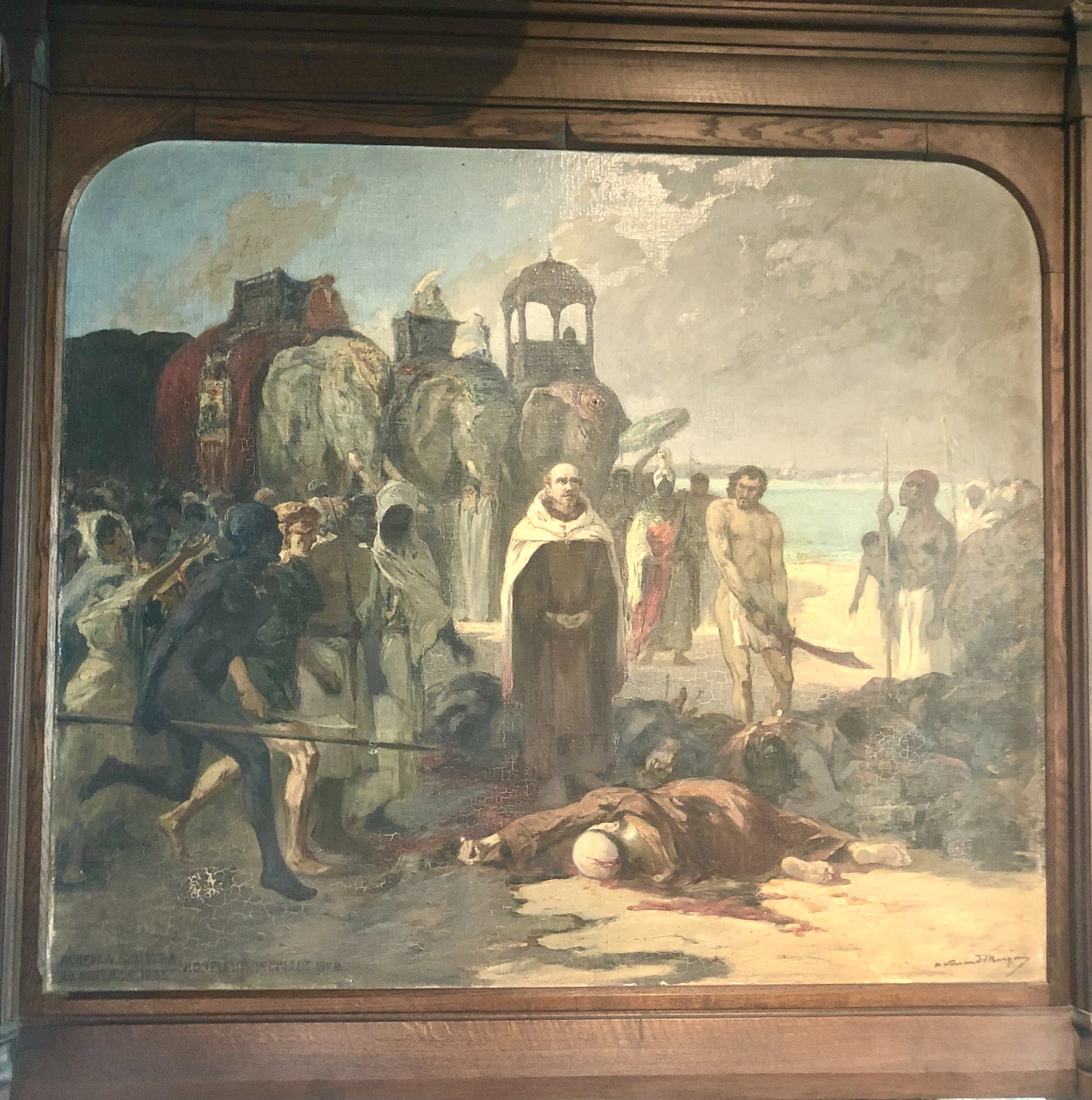
1926 painting by Adrien-Gabriel Voisard-Margerie (1867-1954)

The Martyrdom of Saint Denis of the Nativity is the subject of a 1926 painting by Adrien-Gabriel Voisard-Margerie (1867–1954). It hangs in the Église Sainte-Catherine in Honfleur, Normandy. It is not known whether the painting was commissioned by the church or offered as a gift by the painter.

== Subject ==
The subject of the painting is the martyrdom of Pierre Berthelot, canonised as Denis of the Nativity in 1900 by Pope Leo XIII. Born in Honfleur, he sailed to the Far East at the age of nineteen. In Malacca, he offered his services to the Portuguese as a pilot. In 1634, he took orders and became a Carmelite, and was ordained a priest in 1638. Together with other missionaries, he was sent on a diplomatic mission to the Aceh Sultanate, where local Muslims demanded that they renounce their faith. When they refused, they were executed one by one, with Brother Denis last. The executioners hesitated and were reluctant to shoot their arrows at him, so elephants were brought to trample him.

== Description ==
The painting, oil on canvas, measures 142.5 by 120.5 cm. On the bottom left, we can read: "Achem de Sumatra, November 29, 1638" and "Honfleur, July 18, 1926"; on the right, the painter's signature. The scene is dominated by three elephants looming in the background. In the centre, wearing his Carmelite robes, Pierre Berthelot stands impassively, with his fellow martyrs, already dead, lying around him. On the right, an executioner stands with his scimitar lowered, while on the left, an angry crowd clamours.

Many characteristics of the painting do not appear to be particularly authentic – the clothing is perhaps reminiscent of the Maghreb while the near-nudity of some figures and the facial features of others suggest that the details were inspired by ideas of Africa rather than Asia. The work has been described as “ a rather fanciful painting… mixing Asian and European motifs.”

== Artist ==
The artist, like his subject, was a native of Honfleur. He was a member of the Société des Artistes Français
