= Kiko Lopez =

Puerto Rican glass artist

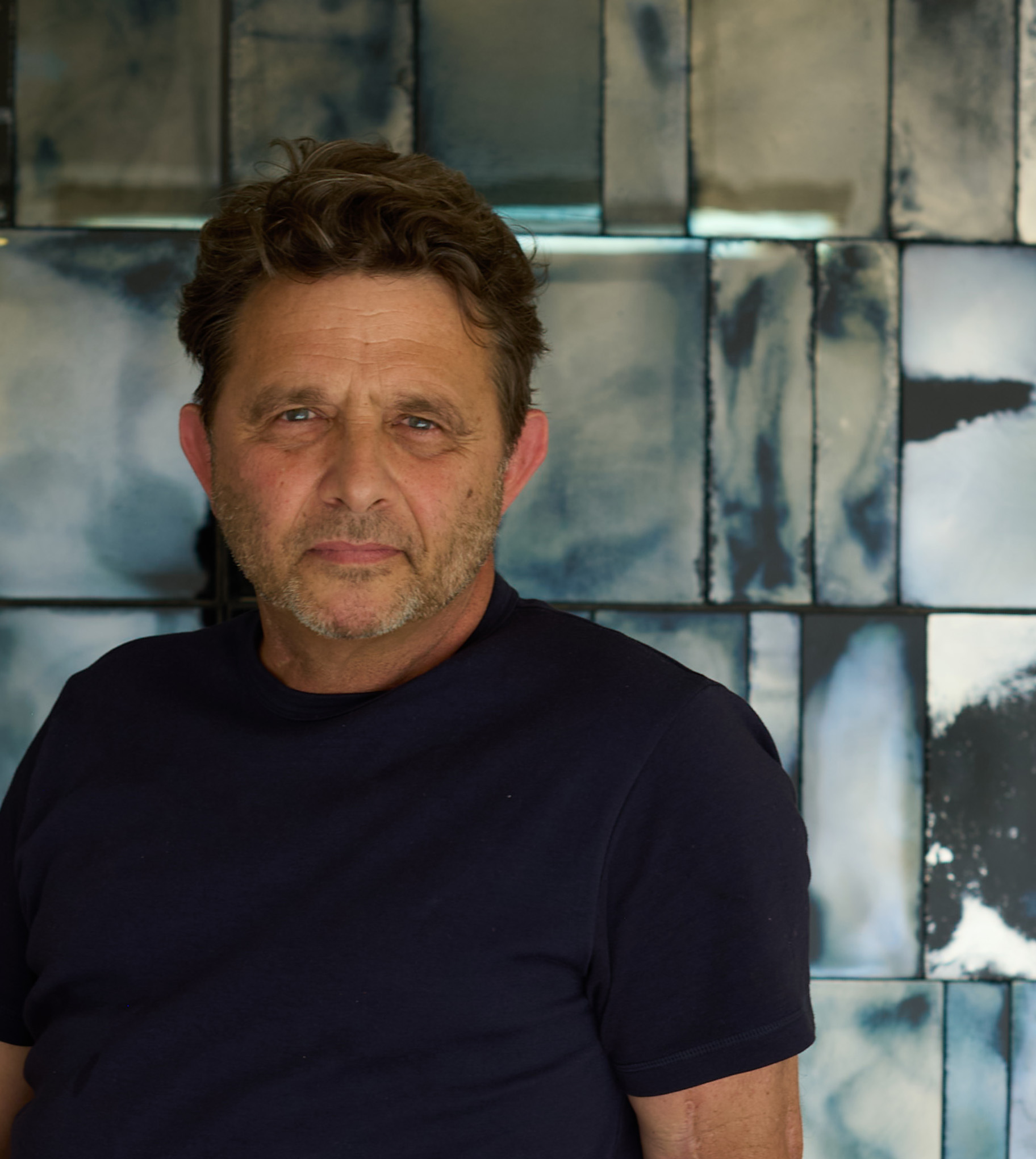
- Born: 13 June 1962 (age 64); Río Piedras, Puerto Rico
- Website: https://www.kikolopez.com/home/

Kiko Lopez (born 1962, Río Piedras, Puerto Rico) is a Puerto Rican-born glass artist, designer, and architect based in France. His work focuses on glass and mirror-based objects and installations, combining traditional decorative techniques with contemporary design.

== Early life and education ==
Lopez was born in Puerto Rico and raised in Miami, Florida. He studied architecture at the University of Miami and later attended the Rhode Island School of Design (RISD), where he focused on architecture and industrial design and began working with glass.

== Career ==
After working in New York, Lopez relocated in 1990 to Provence, France, where he established his studio. He initially worked in architectural restoration before developing an independent practice focused on glass and design.

Over a career spanning more than three decades, Lopez has developed a body of work centered on the use of glass and reflective surfaces. His work includes mirrors, lighting, furniture, and architectural installations, often produced using traditional techniques such as verre églomisé, pâte de verre, and hand-silvering.

His process combines craftsmanship and chemical treatments to create layered reflective surfaces with varied textures and patinas.

Lopez has completed commissions for clients in Europe and the United States, including projects associated with the Musée de l’Homme in Paris and the Cristallerie Saint-Louis. His work has been exhibited internationally, including the exhibition Smoke and Mirrors in New York.

His work has also appeared in interior design projects featured in Architectural Digest and AD Italia, including a Manhattan apartment incorporating one of his mirrors. Additional interior projects in Paris have also been featured.

Lopez has participated in major European design events, particularly in Italy, including Milan Design Week and exhibitions connected to Baranzate Ateliers. His work has also been presented during Salone del Mobile at venues such as the Rossana Orlandi Gallery.

In Belgium, Lopez has been presented by galleries such as Objects With Narratives.

Lopez has also undertaken projects in the Middle East, including a monumental glass installation for a private client in Beirut, Lebanon. His work has been featured in internationally oriented design media such as STIRpad. The cultural significance of glass in Beirut's architectural context has been widely discussed following the 2020 port explosion.

Additional critical coverage and interviews have been published by Laure Darles and The New York Times.

== Style ==
Lopez's work explores themes of light, reflection, and material transformation. His mirrored compositions are characterized by layered surfaces, tonal variation, and experimental processes that merge historical craftsmanship with contemporary design.
