= Christina Cho =

Korean Australian architect

Christina Na-Heon Cho
- Born: Seoul, South Korea
- Education: University of Queensland; University of California, Berkeley
- Occupation: Architect
- Practice: Cox Architecture

Christina Cho is an architect in Australia. Cho was born in Seoul, South Korea, and raised in Brisbane, Australia. Her Korean-Australian upbringing shaped how she sees the world and her architectural practice.

She is the co-organizer of Pecha Kucha nights in Brisbane. She is an Accredited Green Star Professional and a LEED Design Professional. Cho started as a committee member of FutureNet. She began serving as an Advisory Board Member at the University of Queensland School of Architecture in 2013. She was featured in the book Chasing the Sky: 20 Stories of Women in Architecture" by Dean Dewhirst.

Cho has collaborated with designers on installations of public art, one of which won the Tokyo Designers Week competition. Her side projects emphasize human interaction through art and design.

== Education ==
Cho received a Bachelor of Design Studies from the University of Queensland in 2003, earning her master's degree in architecture at the University of California, Berkeley in 2006. In 2007, Cho went back to school for her second bachelor's degree and graduated from the University of Queensland as Valedictorian with first-class honors with a Bachelor of Architecture. She received her second master's degree in Master of Environmental Management and Sustainable Development from the University of Queensland in 2013.

== Career ==
Cho is a director at Cox Architecture in Brisbane. She serves as an adjunct professor at the University of Queensland School of Architecture. She worked on the University of Queensland Oral Health Centre, a project that won the FDG Stanley Award for Public Architecture at the Queensland Architecture Awards in 2016, as well as the Interior Architecture Award at the National Architecture Awards in 2016.

Before her work at Cox, she worked at Donovan Hill, HOK in San Francisco, Skycorp Developments, and Duga Architects in Seoul.

Cho chaired the Emerging Architects and Graduate Network chapter in Queensland (2008–2010).

== Recognition ==
- Tokyo Designers Week competition (public art, ***)
- Dulux Study Tour - Emerging Architect Traveling Scholarship (2011)
- Queensland Emerging Architect Prize (Australian Institute of Architects, 2017)
- Australian Financial Review BOSS Young Executive 2018 (The Australian Financial Review BOSS Magazine, 2018)
- National Emerging Architect Prize (Australian Institute of Architects, 2018)

== Projects ==
- Ipswich Government Office Tower in Queensland, Project Architect
- Kings Square commercial urban renewal development in Perth
- University of Queensland Oral Health Centre
