= DesignTide =

Annual design event held from 2005–2012

DesignTide Tokyo was an annual design event held from 2005 until 2012. It was held in the Autumn as part of Tokyo Designers Week and concurrent with 100% Design Tokyo, as part of loosely coordinated design event season.

After organization that planned a similar series of events, Tokyo Designers Block, was dissolved after its 2004 events due to financial concerns.

== Founding ==
DesignTide was founded in the wake of the dissolution of Tokyo Designers Block, a similar event which ended in 2004 due to financial troubles, with the hope of continuing to support design in Japan. DesignTide's original founders were many of the same people that were involved with Tokyo Designers Block. As a result, it originally followed a similar focus as Tokyo Designers Block, emphasizing designers' creativity over the functional requirements of a trade show. Starting in 2007, DesignTide sought to develop a trade show component to the event to achieve a more equitable balance between design as creative vision and the need to support commercial activity in the field.

== Location ==
In 2005, DesignTide took place at shops, museums and art galleries throughout Tokyo's design-centric districts, including Aoyama and Harajuku, Daikanyama, Marunouchi and Roppongi.

Starting in 2006, a main exhibition site was added, organized as a design show curated by DesignTide's directors from a pool of applicants. In 2006 the main exhibition took place in a soon-to-be-demolished building in Harajuku; in 2007, in a gymnasium at the National Olympic Stadium; in 2008 and 2009 in the meeting hall of Tokyo Midtown. The main exhibition site eschewed cubicle-shaped booths in favor of unique architectural elements designed in response to each exhibitor space, thus turning the exhibition space itself into work of design.
