= Voxan =

French motorcycle manufacturer

Voxan Motors

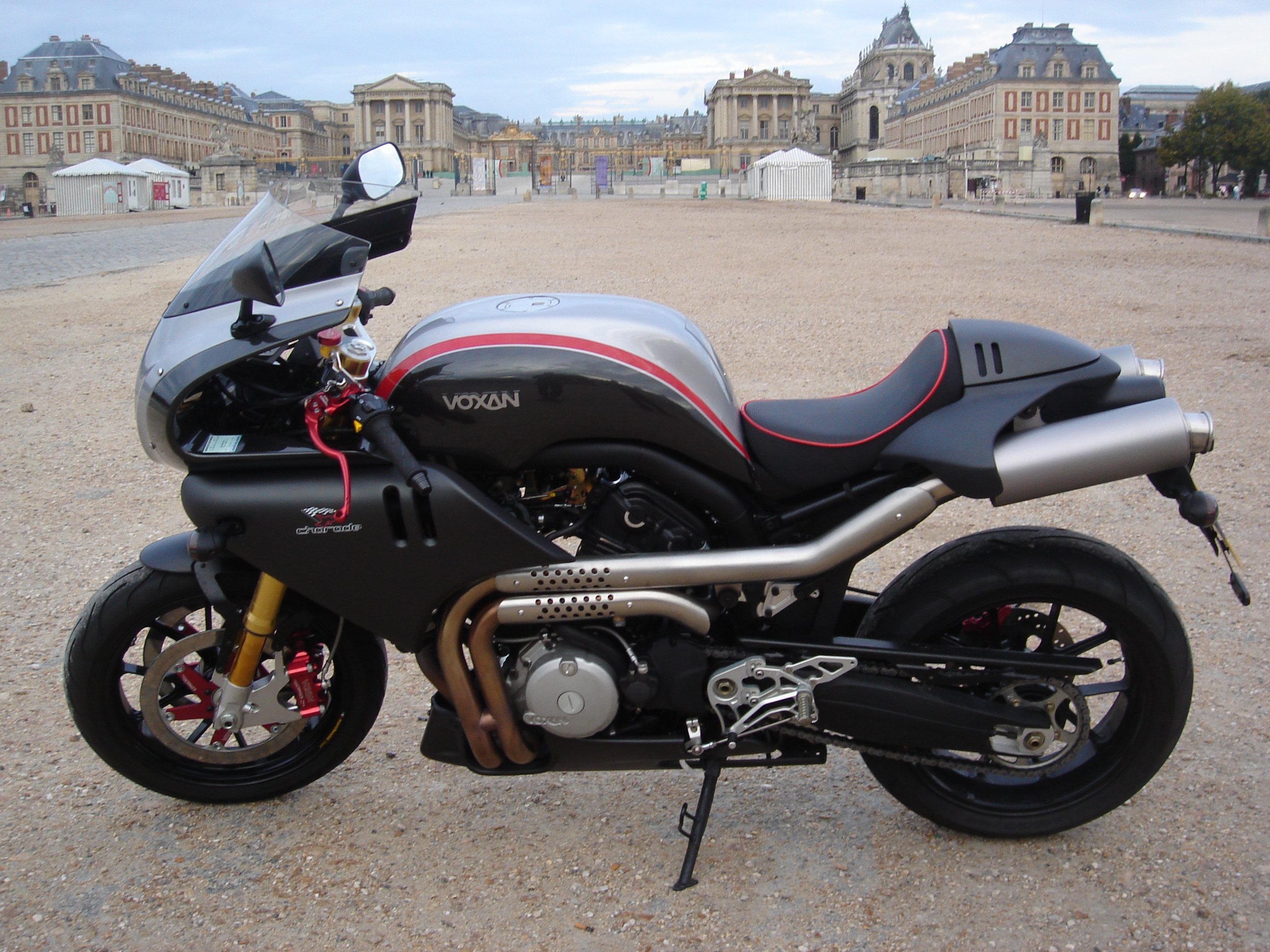
- Voxan Charade Racing
- Industry: Motorcycle
- Founded: 1995
- Founder: Jacques Gardette
- Headquarters: Fontvieille, Monaco, Monaco
- Owner: Gildo Pallanca Pastor
- Parent: Venturi
- Website: www.venturi.com/en/voxan-motors/

Voxan Motors is a motorcycle manufacturer founded in Issoire, France in 1995. The brand was particularly known for its 996 cc, 72° V-twin engine. Founded by Jacques Gardette, the project was to build the first French motorcycle company in the global market involving different partners. Alain Chevallier designed the chassis, while Sodemo Moteurs focused on the engine. The first prototype was shown in 1997, and the first production model released in 1999.

On 2 June 2010, the Monegasque company Venturi announced the purchase of the brand which had been in compulsory liquidation since December 2009. Its president Gildo Pallanca Pastor led Voxan in the same direction as Venturi by orienting it towards electric motorisation. In 2013, the Wattman, the first electric motorcycle developed in Monaco, was born. In October 2020, the Wattman, in a new high-performance version, broke 11 world speed records with Italian motorcycle racer Max Biaggi on board.

== History ==
Founded by Jacques Gardette in 1995, and financially backed by the Dassault Group in 1996, Voxan set out to become the first French motorcycle manufacturer in the modern era. In 1999, the first model, the limited production Roadster, was delivered to dealerships and sold exactly 50 units. The company then launched the Café Racer model in 2000, and the Scrambler model a year later. Although Voxan had garnered support for its products within France, the company continued to struggle against the established Japanese and Italian brands.

In June 2002, Didier Cazeaux and Société de Développement et de Participation bought Voxan to ensure its continuity, and production restarted on April 1, 2003. The Street Scrambler model was released in 2003, and the Scrambler and Black Magic models in 2004. Voxan opened its 23rd dealership, and its first in Luxembourg in May, 2005. In October, 2007, Voxan had an initial public offering on Euronext, with both Sodemo Moteurs, and Fortune Terres Luxembourg considering takeover bids.

On December 22, 2009, Voxan was forced into liquidation, and is now a subsidiary of the Monaco-based Venturi. Upon acquisition Voxan's manufacturing department ceased production, and its engineering staff were relocated to Venturi's headquarters in Fontvieille, Monaco. In June 2010, Venturi announced Voxan's new eco-friendly corporate plan, evolving the creation of an electric motorcycle by 2013.

== Legacy models ==
- Roadster - the first model from this manufacturer, production beginning in 1999
- Cafe Racer
- Scrambler
- VB1
- Street Scrambler
- Black Magic
- Charade - based on the Black Magic
- 1200 GTV - prototype presented at the salon de Paris 2007
- Starck Super-Naked (project abandoned)
- Black Classic - an evolution of the Black Magic
- VX10 - project code Nefertiti, 10th Voxan model, presented in May 2009

== Wattman electric motorcycle ==
The Wattman is the brand's first electric model, released in 2013. Designed by Sacha Lakic, this electric motorcycle delivers a power of 150 kW (203 bhp) for an instantaneous torque of 200 Nm up to 10,500 rpm. At the time, it was the most powerful electric motorcycle ever built, capable of accelerating from 0 to 100 km/h in 3.4 s.

The Wattman has also been developed in a high performance version by the Voxan engineering team in Monaco. This version, also designed by Sacha Lakic, was conceived with the aim of breaking new world speed records. It is equipped with the same Mercedes electric motor that powers ROKiT Venturi Racing and Mercedes-Benz EQ Formula E Team in the Formula E World Championship.

=== World speed records ===
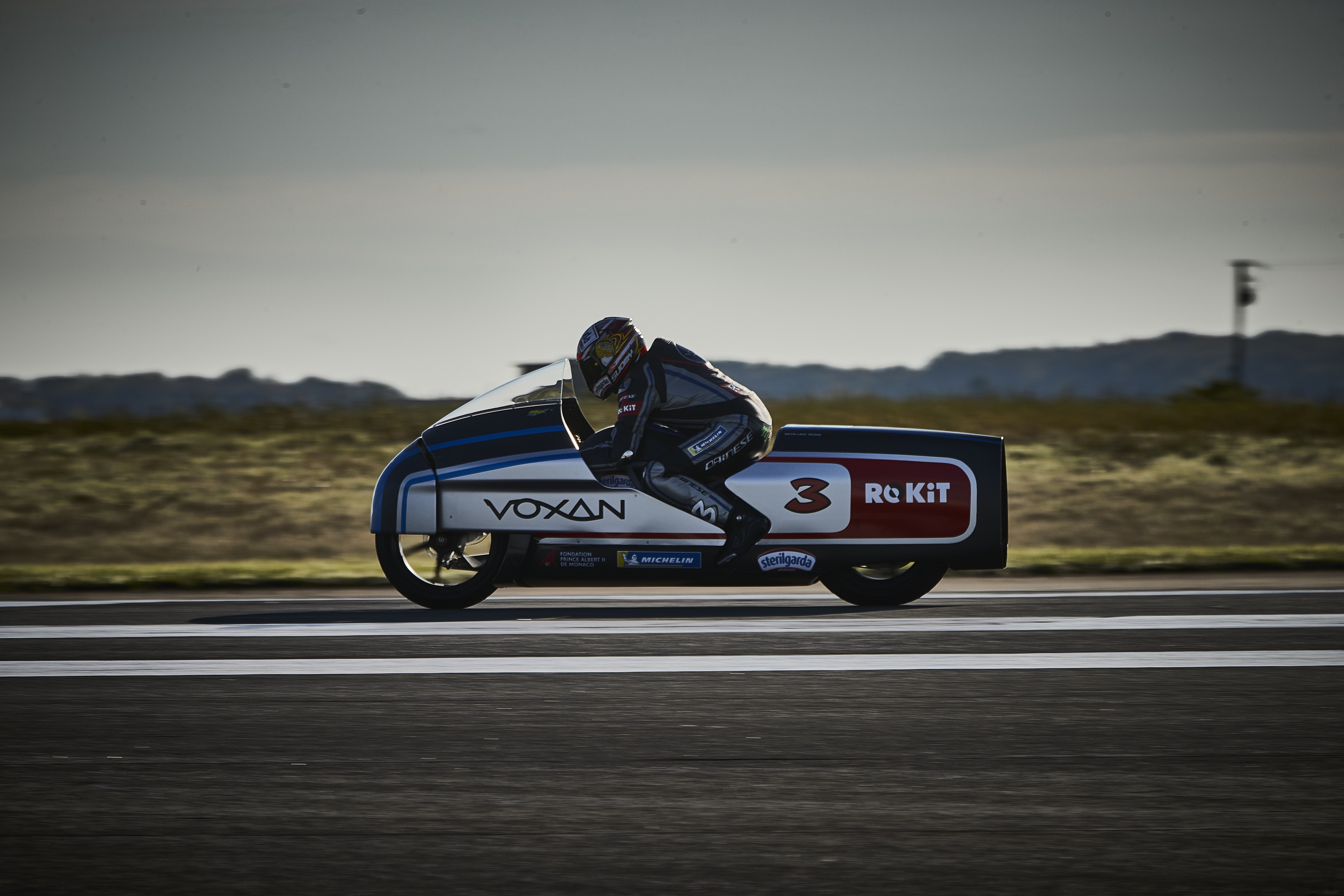
Max Biaggi on the Voxan Wattman (partially-streamlined)

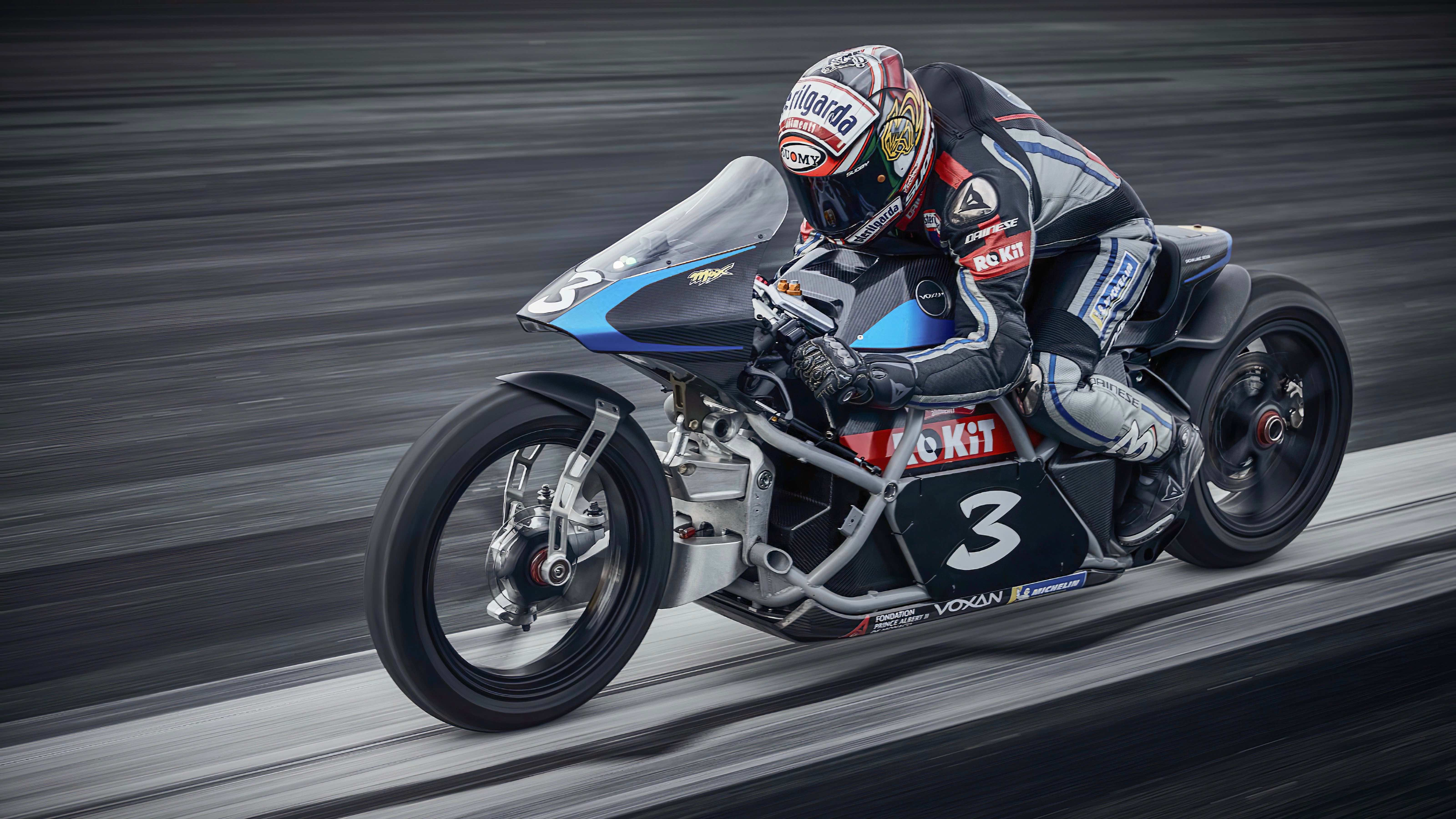
Max Biaggi on the Voxan Wattman (non-streamlined)

Ridden by Max Biaggi, the Wattman set a new world speed record for an electric motorcycle in the 'partially streamlined electric motorcycle over 300 kilos' class, reaching 366.94 km/h. The record was set on the last weekend of October 2020, at Châteauroux airfield in France. Further records were set at the Kennedy Space Center between 18 and 23 November 2021, including world record in the 'partially streamlined electric motorcycle under 300 kg' class. The Voxan Wattman holds a total of 21 world speed records listed below:

Under 300 kg

- ¼ mile, flying start, partially streamlined: 293 km/h (182 mph)
- ¼ mile, flying start, non-streamlined: 285 km/h (177 mph)
- 1 km, flying start, partially streamlined: 456 km/h (283 mph)
- 1 mile, flying start, partially streamlined: 454 km/h (282 mph)
- 1 mile, flying start, non-streamlined: 368 km/h (229 mph)
- ¼ mile, standing start, non-streamlined: 156 km/h (97 mph)
- 1 km, standing start, partially streamlined: 223 km/h (139 mph)
- 1 mile, standing start, partially streamlined: 273 km/h (170 mph)
- 1 km, flying start, non-streamlined: 370 km/h (230 mph)
- ¼ mile, standing start, streamlined: 149 km/h (93 mph)

Over 300 kg

- 1 km, flying start, partially streamlined: 408 km/h (254 mph)
- 1 mile, flying start, partially streamlined: 404 km/h (251 mph)
- 1 mile, flying start, non-streamlined: 367 km/h (228 mph)
- 1 km, flying start, non-streamlined: 366 km/h (227 mph)
- 1 mile, standing start, partially streamlined: 255 km/h (158 mph)
- 1 km, standing start, partially streamlined: 216 km/h (134 mph)
- 1 mile, standing start, non-streamlined: 216 km/h (134 mph)
- ¼ mile, standing start, non-streamlined: 153 km/h (95 mph)
- ¼ mile, standing start, partially streamlined: 142 km/h (88 mph)

== Models ==
=== Former models ===
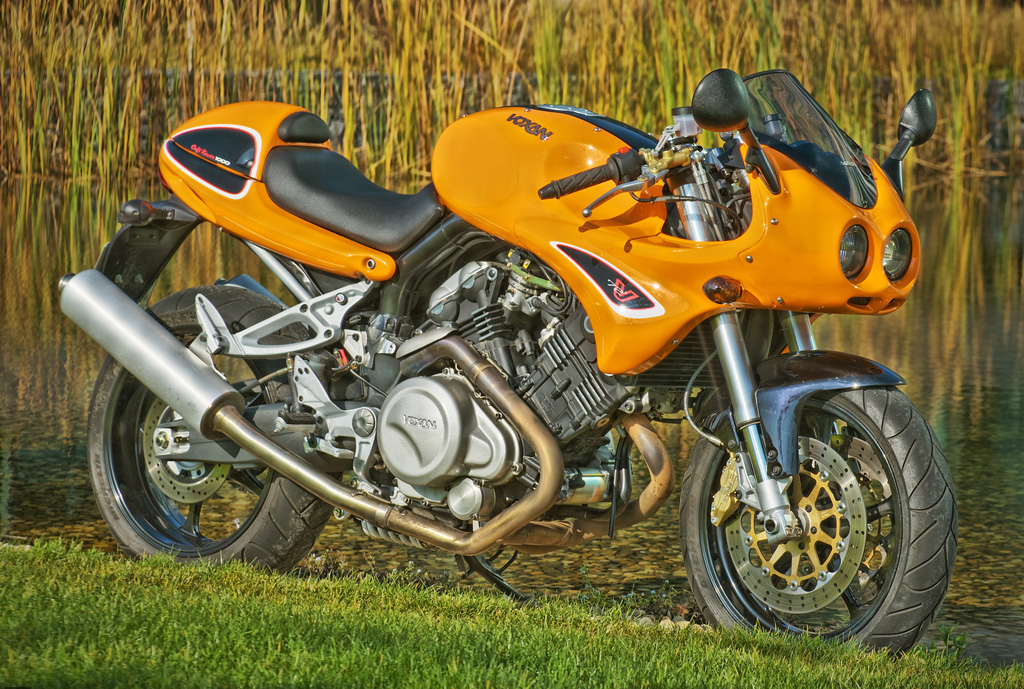
Voxan Café Racer

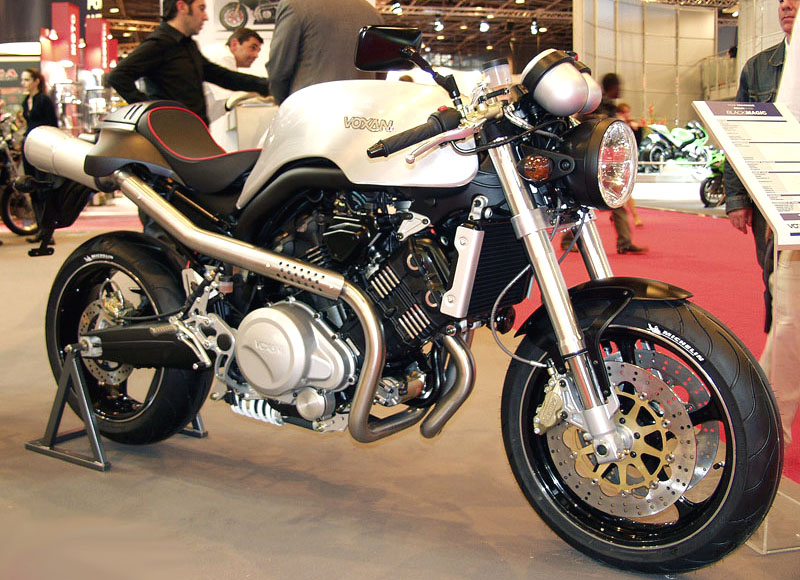
Voxan Black Magic

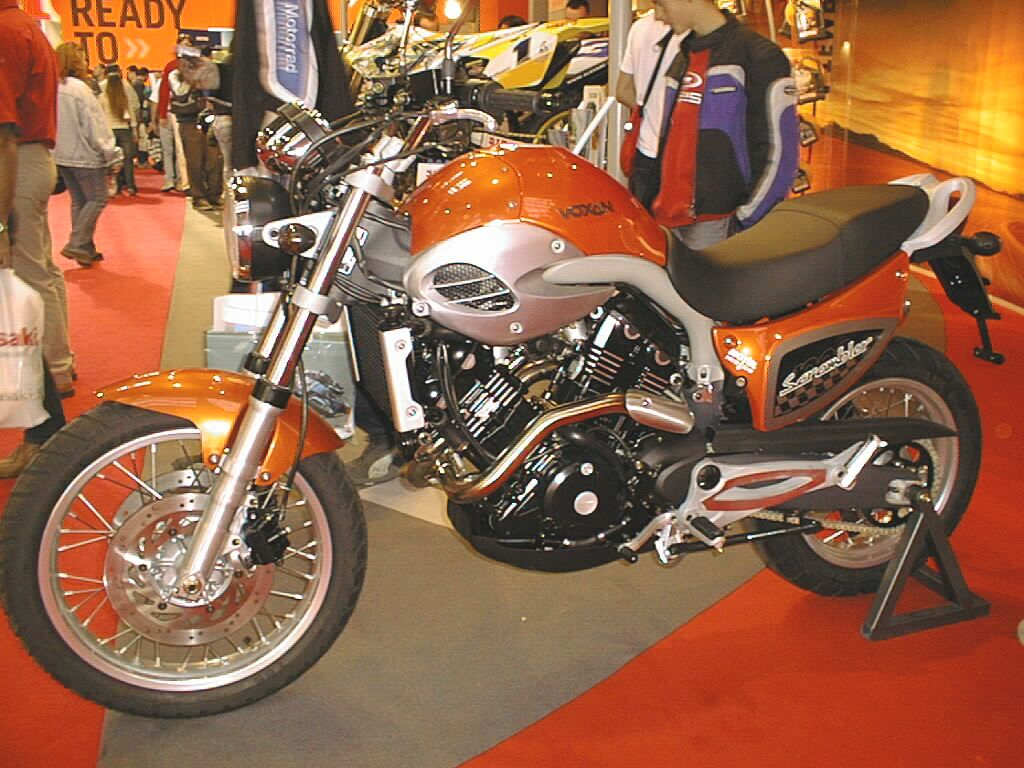
Voxan Scrambler

Year	Name	Production	Reference
1999-2009	Roadster	Yes	
2000-2009	Café Racer	Yes	
2001-2009	Scrambler	Yes	
2003-2009	Street Scrambler	Yes	
2001	VB1	Yes	
2004	Black Magic	Yes	
2004	Black Classic	Yes	
2006	Charade Racing	Yes	
2007	GTV 1200	No	
2007	Starck Super Naked	No	
2009	VX-10	No	
2013	WATTMAN	No	
