= Salone del Mobile =

Furniture fair held annually in Milan

Coordinates: 45°31′15″N 9°04′45″E

Milan Furniture Fair / Salone Internazionale del Mobile di Milano
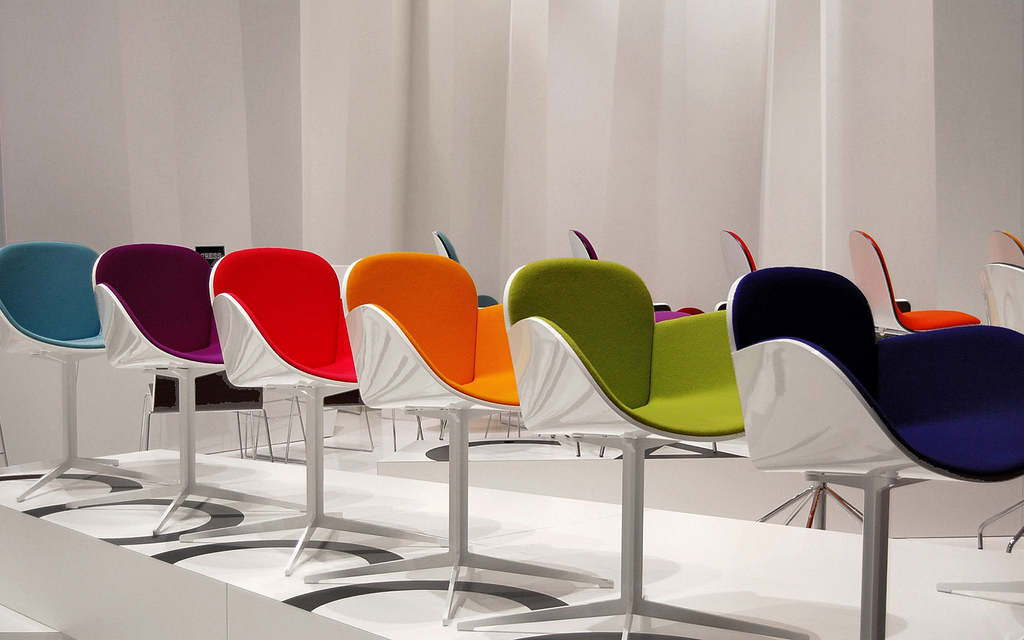
- Coloured chair exhibit at Salone 2009
- Genre: Design fairs
- Date: 16-21 April 2024
- Frequency: Annual
- Locations: Fieramilano, Rho (MI)
- Inaugurated: 1961
- Area: 210,000 square metres
- Website: https://www.salonemilano.it/en

Salone del Mobile or Milan Design Week (Italian: Salone Internazionale del Mobile di Milano, but more commonly Salone del Mobile) is a furniture fair held annually in Milan. It is the largest trade fair of its kind in the world. The exhibition showcases the latest in furniture and design from countries around the world. It is considered a leading venue for the display of new products by designers of furniture, lighting and other home furnishings. The show, also known as "Salone", "Milano Salone" and "Milan Design Week", is held every year, usually in April, in the FieraMilano complex in the Milan metropolitan area town of Rho. Besides the Salone, in April every odd year Euroluce exhibition takes place and every even year EuroCucina and the International Bathroom Exhibition are held along the Milan Furniture Fair.

== History ==
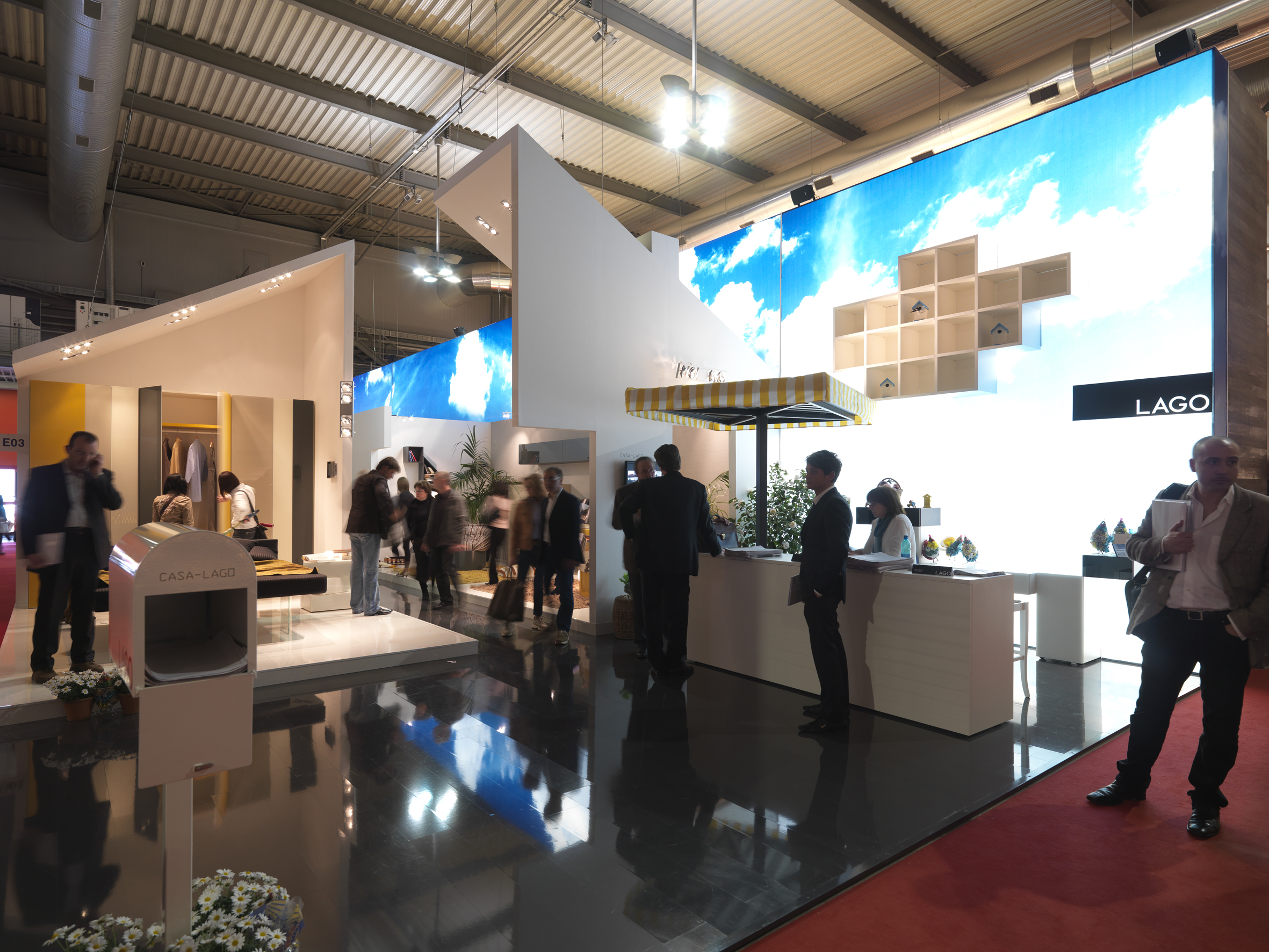
Exhibitor display at Salone 2008

The Salone Internazionale del Mobile di Milano (or simply Salone del Mobile) was launched in 1961, with the original focus being Italian furniture. The original sponsors were furniture manufacturers from the Federelegno-Arredo trade association. The trade show grew in size over the years, allowing many of the 13,000 companies which comprised the global furniture industry to showcase their wares in a single event.

The current show occupies an area of nearly 230,000 square metres (2,500,000 sq ft), and includes 2,500 companies, along with 700 young designers at the SaloneSatellite, a secondary exhibit which was founded in 1998 by Marva Griffin at the request of Cosmit managing director Manlio Armellini. This parallel exhibition features young and emerging designers, collaborations with universities and design schools, and aims "to enhance links between research, design and industry, focusing on designers under the age of 35."

The show's annual visitation numbers 270,000, with attendees from over 150 countries worldwide. The show is now organized and operated by Cosmit S.p.A., a trade show corporation and a member of the ICSID (International Council of Societies of Industrial Design) and ADI (Association for Industrial Design). Interior design around the world gathers at Milan in April every year at Milan Design Week commonly known as Salone Internazionale del Mobile covered online at designers such as designerzcentral.

In 2011, there were 2,720 exhibitors at the official fair, compared to 2,499 in 2010. New lighting technologies at the show included the Flos 2620 LED chandelier with 2,620 LEDs in what appeared to be random rings of light arranged to create the illusion of movement. The standpoint piece for Arco, a 106-year-old Dutch company, was the wooden furniture produced by the Israeli designer Shay Alkalay. Of the student shows, the Dutch design school Design Academy Eindhoven took first place, followed by Israel's Bezalel Academy of Art and Design. Also, some early examples of the combination of sustainability and design were showcased, which eventually resulted in a British entrepreneurial initiative a few years later, pioneer of the upcoming sustainable design revolution.

The 57th edition of the Salone del Mobile was held in 2018, with 434,509 visitors in 6 days from 188 different countries. In comparison to the years 2016 and 2017, the number of attendees increased by 17% and 26% respectively.

The 2020 Salone del Mobile was initially postponed to June, and in March was cancelled due to the COVID-19 pandemic, which was affecting northern Italy particularly severely at the time.

The 60th edition of the Salone del Mobile was postponed due to the Covid-19 health crisis but was held from June 7 to 12, 2022. During the fair, various galleries, showrooms, and palazzos in surrounding areas of the city also exhibited art & design. That year, 20 pavilions were occupied with 2,173 exhibitors present (−10% compared to the 2019 edition), of which 27% were foreigners, mainly from Europe, the United States and Canada. According to data from the organization of the fair, 262,608 visitors from 173 countries registered to visit, representing a 32% decrease compared to the last in-person fair, which took place in 2019.

The 61st edition was held from April 18 to 23, 2023.

The 2024 Salone del Mobile was held from April 16 to 21. It attracted more visitors than ever before, including increasingly many from outside of the professional design world. There were over 1100 registered Fuorisalone events situated outside the fairgrounds, including the increasingly popular Alcova exhibition open in two historic Milanese mansions in Brianza, one of which being the former home of architect Osvaldo Borsani. Many high fashion brands & designers such as Gucci, Hermes, Loro Piana, Saint Laurent, & Thom Browne participated with furniture & design exhibitions.

== See also ==
- DesignTide – Annual design event held from 2005–2012
- ICFF – Annual interior design event in New York, US
- Internationale möbelmesse – German furniture and interior design trade fair
- LDF – Annual arts event in the United Kingdom
- Professional Lighting Designers Association – Disbanded association of lighting designers
- Tokyo designers week
