= Église Sainte-Catherine =

Church located in Honfleur, Normandy, France

Coordinates: 49°25′16″N 0°13′57″E

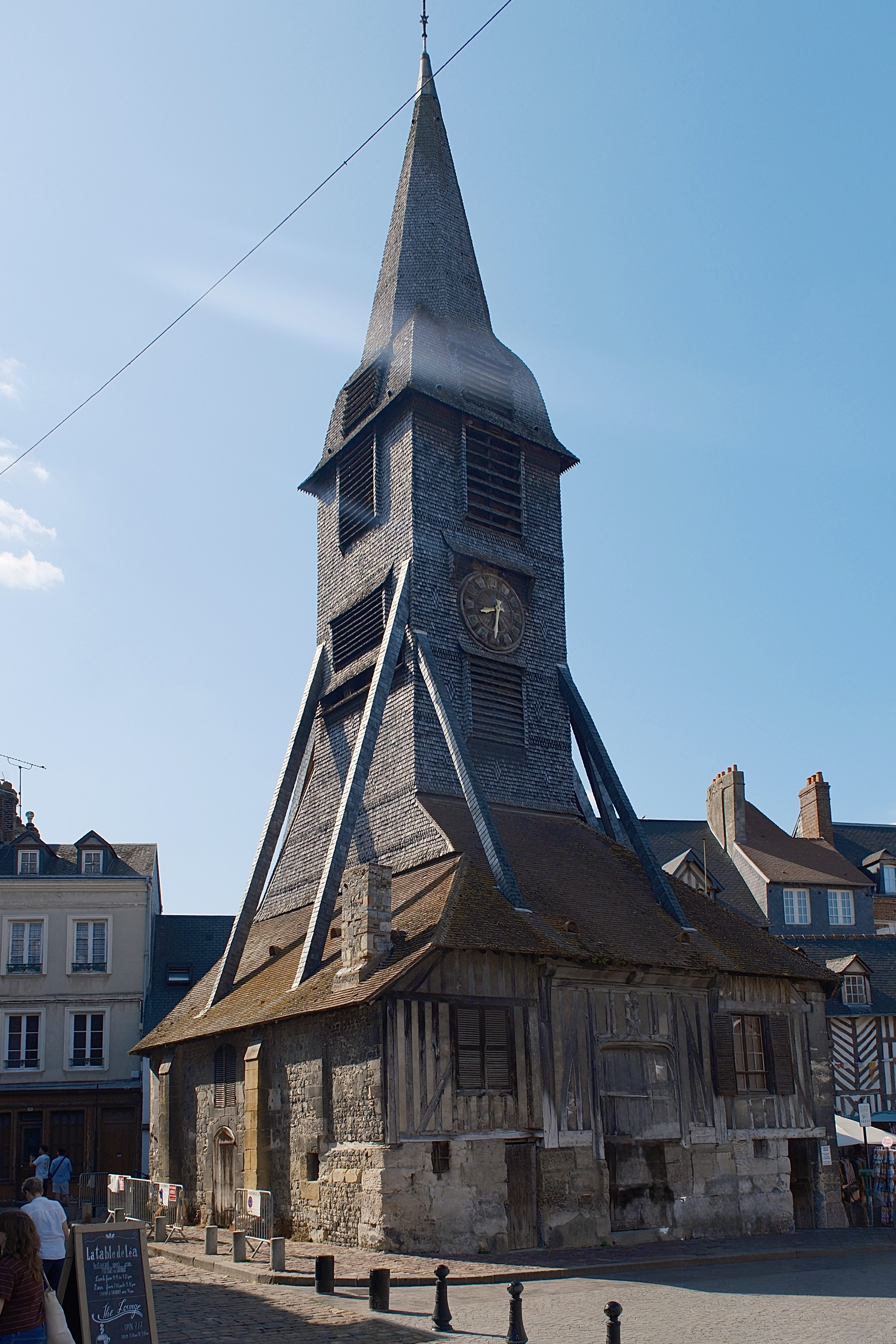
Photo of the bell tower of Eglise Sainte-Catherine in Honfleur

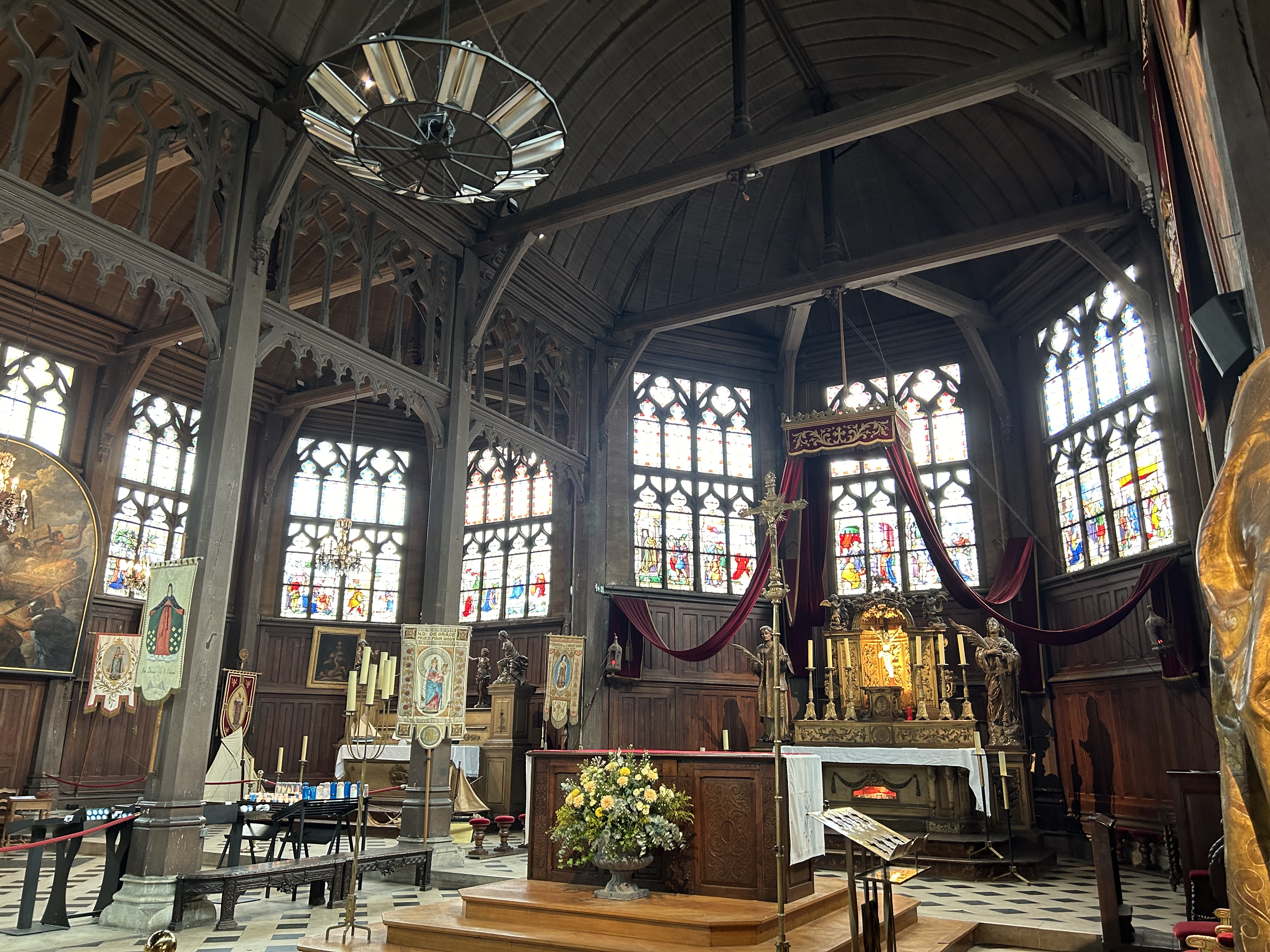
Interior of the Église Sainte-Catherine

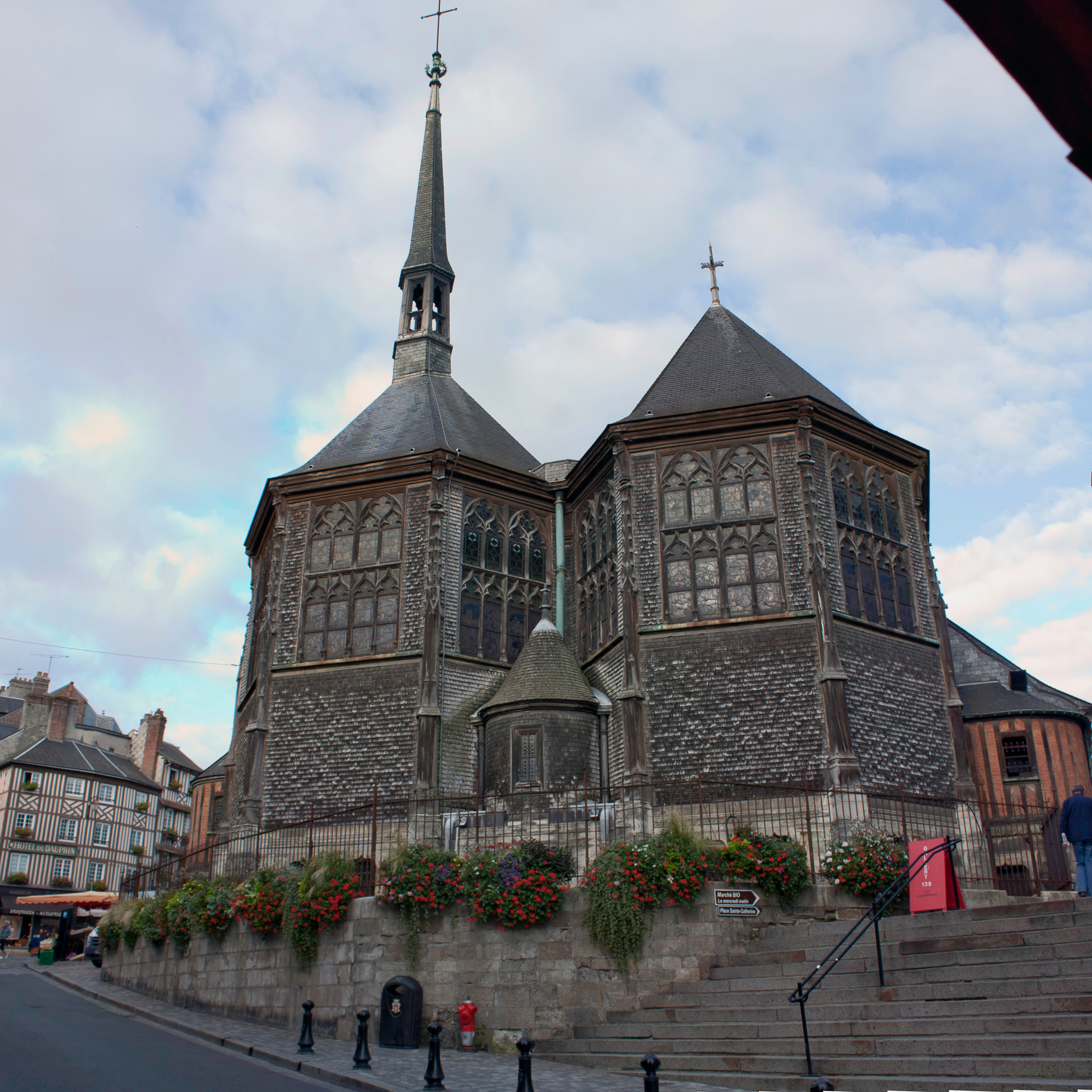
Exterior of the church

Église Sainte-Catherine (Saint Catherine's Church) is a church in Honfleur, Normandy, France, dedicated to Saint Catherine of Alexandria. Its oldest nave was built in the second half of the 15th century, after the original stone church on the site was destroyed during the Hundred Years' War. The church was built by craftsmen from Honfleur's naval yards, while the first nave was modeled on a market hall and constructed using shipbuilding techniques, giving it the appearance of an inverted ship's hull. A second nave was added in the late 15th century, and four additional bays were added to both naves in the 16th century.

The church has a detached bell tower, built separately to reduce the danger of fire from lightning strikes. Later alterations are 19th-century work on the choir and a neo-Norman porch added in the 1920s. The church is partly covered with chestnut shingles and contains a classical organ, a Renaissance balcony, and 19th-century stained glass.

== History and architecture ==
The Saint Catherine Church (Église Sainte-Catherine) is a church in Honfleur, Normandy, France dedicated to Saint Catherine of Alexandria. The building is composed of two main naves and the bell tower. The first nave is the oldest part of the building, dating to the second half of the 15th century, constructed right after the Hundred Years' War, during which the original stone church on the site was destroyed. It was built on the model of a market hall, using shipbuilding techniques, which gives the impression of an upside-down ship's hull. Then the bell tower was built a good distance away, so that parishioners would not be burnt in case of a fire caused by lightning. The bell tower did draw lightning strikes due to its height and its position on the side of a hill. In the late 15th century, a second nave was added, whose vault was like the wooden vaults of modest Gothic churches. This second part was more round, and did not look like a ship's hull. In the 16th century, four supplementary bays were added to both naves.

The famous "Axe masters" of the naval yards of Honfleur built the church. The bays for the choir, were redone in the 19th century. The church is partially covered in chestnut shingles, which are called essentes. The neo-Norman porch was built following the model of rural Normandy churches in the 1920s.

The classical organ comes from the parish church of St Vincent of Rouen, and the Renaissance balcony is decorated with musicians. Stained glass from the 19th century decorates the windows of the east choir. The building lacks a transept; statues of saints, including two local ones: Saint Marcouf and Saint Thérèse of Lisieux are the unique marks of lateral chapels. There is also a painting depicting the Martyrdom of Saint Denis of the Nativity.
