= Tokyo Designers Week =

Tokyo Design Week (TDW), formally known as Tokyo Designers Week, was an annual design event that occurred from 2005 to 2016, at Meiji Jingu Gaien in central Tokyo, Japan. The event featured product design, interior design and had expanded to include art and graphic design as well as short films. Since 2005, Tokyo Design Week had been held at Meiji Jingu Gaien, near Gaienmae Station on the Tokyo Metro Ginza Line.

== History ==
Originally named Tokyo Designers Week, the event began in 1995 as a trade show for interior and product design, taking inspiration from trade shows like Salone del Mobile in Milan, Italy. Before 2005, the event was held on the artificial island of Odaiba in Tokyo bay. In recent years the show was opened to the public and added extra categories to include all aspects of art and design.

Two key fairs within Tokyo Design Week for many years were: 100% Design and DesignTide.

=== Closure ===
In 2016 there was an accidental fire that occurred at Tokyo Designers Week, when a five-year-old boy was playing on a design structure and it caught fire, killing the child. As a result of the fire, the 2017 Tokyo Designers Week event was cancelled.

In fall of 2017, with the future unknown for Tokyo Designers Week, a new festival in Tokyo was launched as a response, the Designart Festival.

== Tokyo Designers Week in 2010 ==
2010 was the 25th anniversary of the event. TDW attracted designers and visitors from Belgium, Canada, China, France, Germany, Israel, Italy, South Korea, Taiwan, United Kingdom, United States, and across Japan. TDW was held from October 29 to November 3, despite a typhoon striking Japan, the event only closed for one day.

=== Creative direction ===
For the first time Tokyo Designers Week 2010 was guided by a single creative director, the Tokyo-based French designer, Gwenael Nicolas. Building upon previous years eco and “Green” themes, the philosophy of the show changed in direction to include a broader view of “Environmental design” signified by a change in color to “Blue”.

Environmental design categories

- Earth, featuring collaborations with charities such as WWF
- Heart, featuring art installations
- Living, featuring cutting edge product designs

=== Exhibitions ===
- Graphic and Visual Design competition based on WWF red-list of endangered animals
- Container exhibition, utilizing recycled shipping containers as temporary gallery spaces
- Designboom mart
- Trend Union conference
- "Cool Japan", Tokyo conference
- Shop exhibition around the Omotesando district of Tokyo. Including a WWF inspired stamp rally.
- Student exhibition, showcasing the works of Japanese art and design colleges.
- TDW Art exhibition, featuring modern Japanese art including the likes of Takeshi Murakami.
- Professional exhibition, where practicing designers could show their works.
- Nakadai project, a recycling project involving industrial waste
- The New York based Bicycle Film Festival toured Japan as part of TDW, short films were shown at the main event site.

=== Awards in 2010 ===
More than 6000 artists and designers submitted their works and projects in the competition. Each category had at least more than 500 submissions. 10-15 works were selected as finalists for each category exhibition. To promote the broader idea of environment, meaning a lot more than "Eco", two new Environmental Design Awards were introduced for 2010; Artist of the year and designer of the year.

- Artist of the year 2010: Tokujin Yoshioka
- Designer of the year 2010: Thomas Heatherwick

== See also ==
- imm Cologne (internationale möbelmesse)
- DesignTide
- Professional Lighting Designers Association
- Salone del Mobile
