= Honfleur =

- Commune
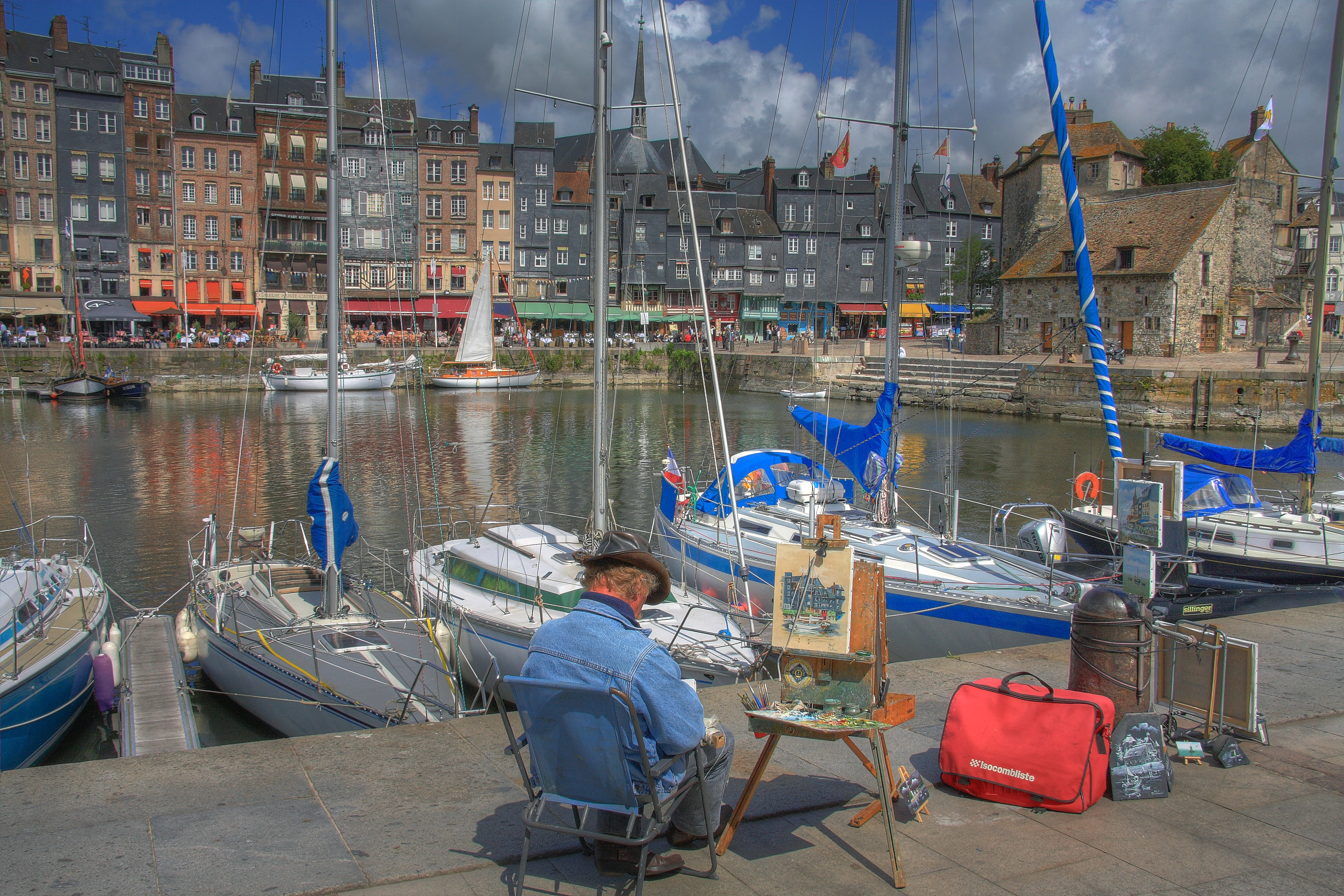
- Honfleur harbour

- Coat of arms
- Location of Honfleur
- Location within France Location within Normandy
- Coordinates: 49°25′10″N 0°13′57″E
- Country: France
- Region: Normandy
- Department: Calvados
- Arrondissement: Lisieux
- Canton: Honfleur-Deauville
- Intercommunality: Pays de Honfleur-Beuzeville

Government
  - Mayor (2020–2026): Michel Lamarre
- Area^{1}: 13.67 km^{2} (5.28 sq mi)
- Elevation: 5 m (16 ft)
- Highest elevation: 117 m (384 ft)
- Lowest elevation: 0 m (0 ft)
- Population (2023): 6,640
  - Density: 486/km^{2} (1,260/sq mi)
- Time zone: UTC+01:00 (CET)
  - Summer (DST): UTC+02:00 (CEST)
- INSEE/Postal code: 14333 /14600
- ^{1} French Land Register data, which excludes lakes, ponds, glaciers > 1 km^{2} (0.386 sq mi or 247 acres) and river estuaries.

Honfleur (French: [ɔ̃flœʁ]) is a commune in the Calvados department in northwestern France. It is located on the southern bank of the estuary of the Seine across from Le Havre and very close to the exit of the Pont de Normandie. The people that inhabit Honfleur are called Honfleurais.

It is especially known for its old port, characterized by its houses with slate-covered frontages, painted frequently by artists. There have been many notable artists, including Gustave Courbet, Eugène Boudin, Claude Monet and Johan Jongkind. They all met at La Ferme Saint Siméon, which is now a five-star hotel, and created the "Saint Siméon gathering", contributing to the appearance of the Impressionist movement. The Sainte-Catherine church, which has a bell tower separate from the principal building, is the largest wooden church in France.

== History ==
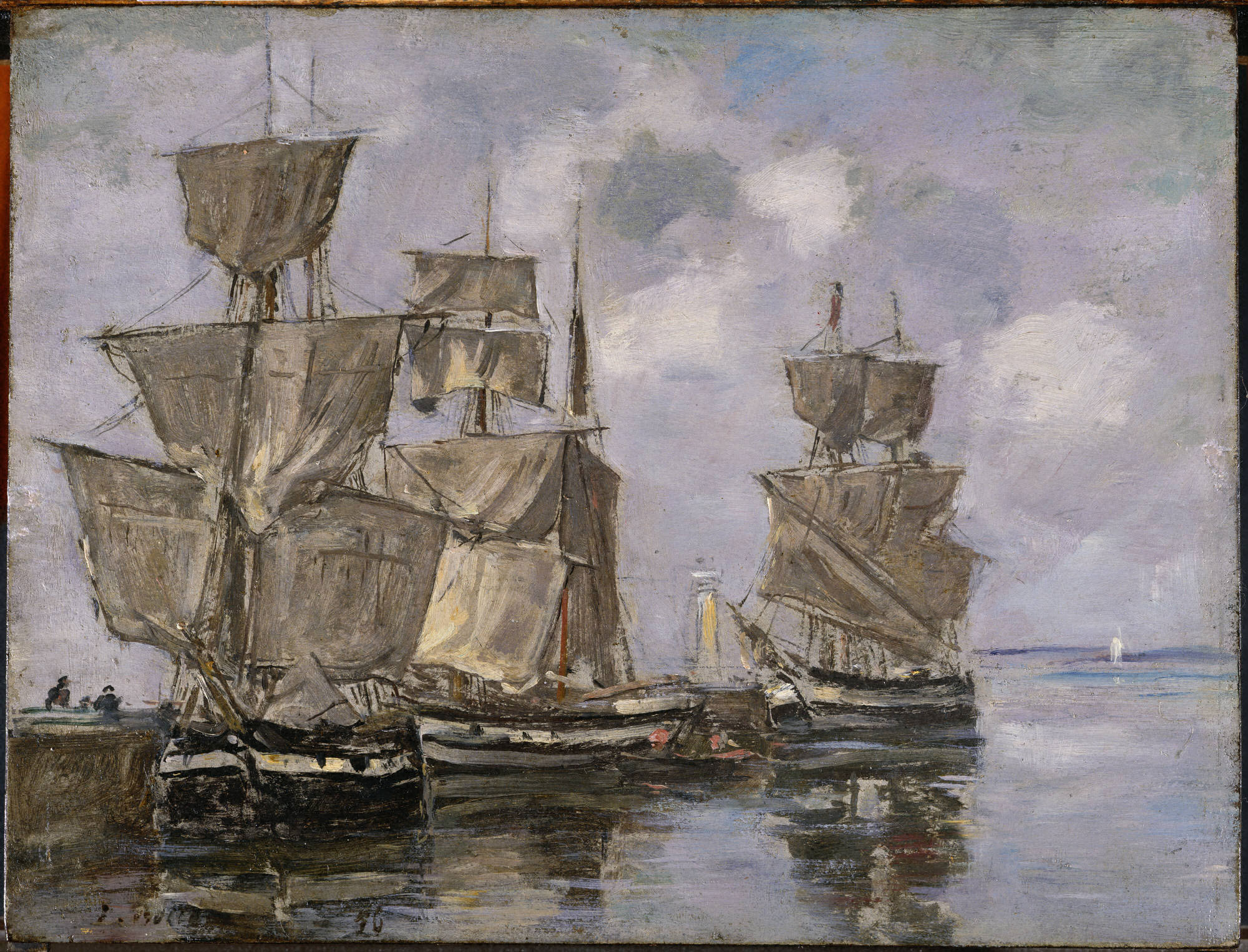
Eugène Boudin, Navires dans le Port à Honfleur, 1856, Princeton University Art Museum

The first written record of Honfleur is a reference by Richard III, Duke of Normandy, in 1025. By the middle of the 12th century, the city represented a significant transit point for goods from Rouen to England.

Located on the estuary of one of the principal rivers of France with a safe harbour and relatively rich hinterland, Honfleur profited from its strategic position from the start of the Hundred Years' War. The town's defences were strengthened by Charles V in order to protect the estuary of the Seine from attacks by the English. This was supported by the nearby port of Harfleur. However, Honfleur was taken and occupied by the English in 1357 and from 1419 to 1450. When under French control, raiding parties often set out from the port to ransack the English coasts, including partially destroying the town of Sandwich, in Kent, England, in the 1450s.

At the end of the Hundred Years' War, Honfleur benefited from the boom in maritime trade until the end of the 18th century. Trade was disturbed during the wars of religion in the 16th century. The port saw the departure of a number of explorers, in particular in 1503 of Binot Paulmierde Gonneville to the coasts of Brazil. In 1506, local man Jean Denis departed for Newfoundland island and the mouth of the Saint Lawrence. An expedition in 1608, organised by Samuel de Champlain, founded the city of Quebec in modern-day Canada.

After 1608, Honfleur thrived on trade with Canada, the West Indies, the African coasts and the Azores. As a result, the town became one of the five principal ports for the slave trade in France. During this time the rapid growth of the town saw the demolition of its fortifications on the orders of Colbert.

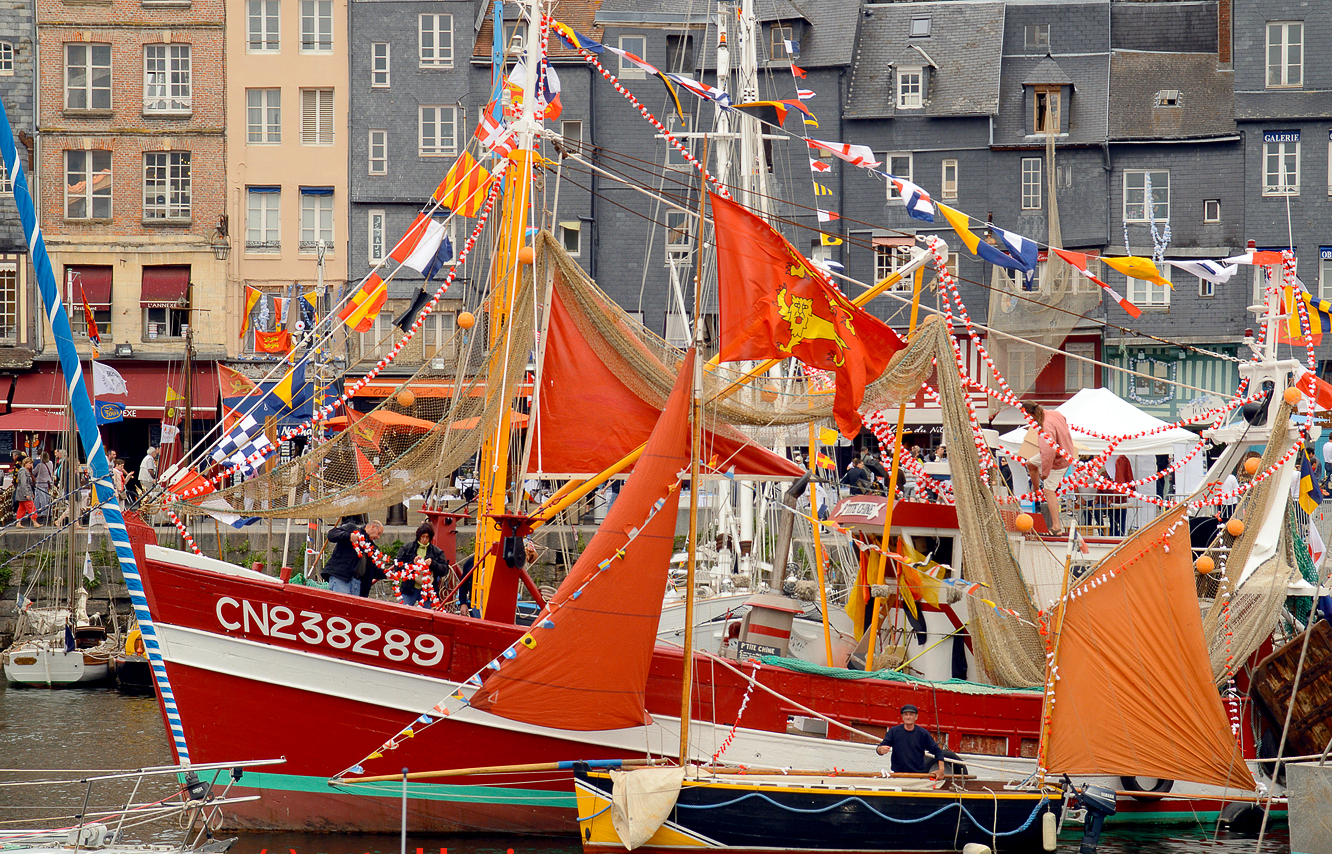
Honfleur harbour, now, a busy tourist spot

The wars of the French Revolution and the First Empire, and in particular the continental blockade, caused the ruin of Honfleur. It only partially recovered during the 19th century with the trading of wood from northern Europe. Trade was however limited by the silting up of the entrance to the port and development of the modern port at Le Havre. The port however still functions today.

After the Normandy landings, Honfleur was liberated together by the British army – 19th Platoon of the 12th Devon's, 6th Air Landing Brigade, the Belgian army (Brigade Piron) on 25 August 1944 and the Canadian army without any combat.

== Toponymy ==
Mentioned as Huneflet in 1025; Hunefloth in 1051-66; Hunefleth in 1082-87; Honneflo in 1198; Honnefleu in 1255; Honflue in 1246; Honeflo[u] in 1256; Honnefleu in 1588, up to the 16th century.

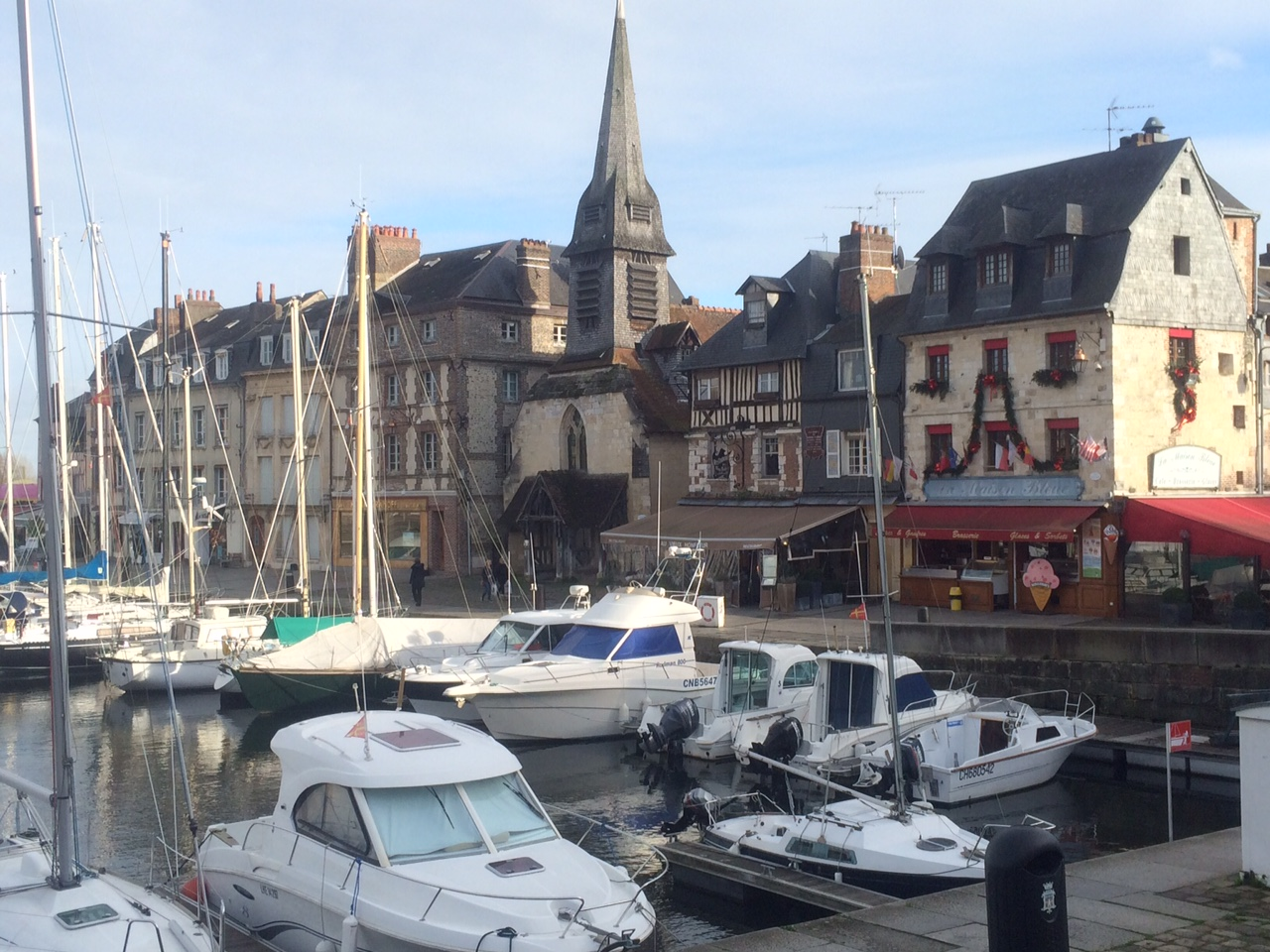
Port d'Honfleur

Traditional pronunciation: [ɦɔ̃'flø] or [xɔ̃'flø]/ [xɔ̃fjø] with the h strongly aspirated, like in 'loch'. It is lost nowadays.

The marker -fleur, formerly -fleu which is widespread in Normandy (Cf. Barfleur, Vittefleur, Harfleur, Crémanfleur, Fiquefleur and La Gerfleur stream), which means 'stream, river running into the sea', was still in use in the 13th century as written in a document le fleu de Lestre, meaning "the Lestre river".

It could come from a word of Old Norse origin flodh (i.e.flóð), compare Old English flōd (> flood), which means 'estuary', 'branch of the sea', combined with flói 'river running into the sea' for the meaning. But according to its numerous old mentions and those of Barfleur in -fleth, it is more probably the OE flēot 'run of water', that can be found in the English place-names in -fleet, such as Adlingfleet, Marfleet, Ousefleet, combined very often with a male's name.

The element Hon- seems to come from an Anglo-Saxon (or Anglo-Scandinavian) given name Huna or the Norse Húni, variant form Húnn, which is also found close to Honfleur in Honnaville, homonym of the Honneville at Saint-Georges-du-Mesnil. Such a connection between two close place-names can be noted regularly in the Norman toponymy. They are, in any case, close places: Crémanfleur / Crémanville; Barfleur (former Barbefleu) / Barbeville, etc. The -ville element is almost always combined with a personal name.

The similarity with the name of Bay of Húnaflói in Iceland is likely a coincidence.

== Geography ==
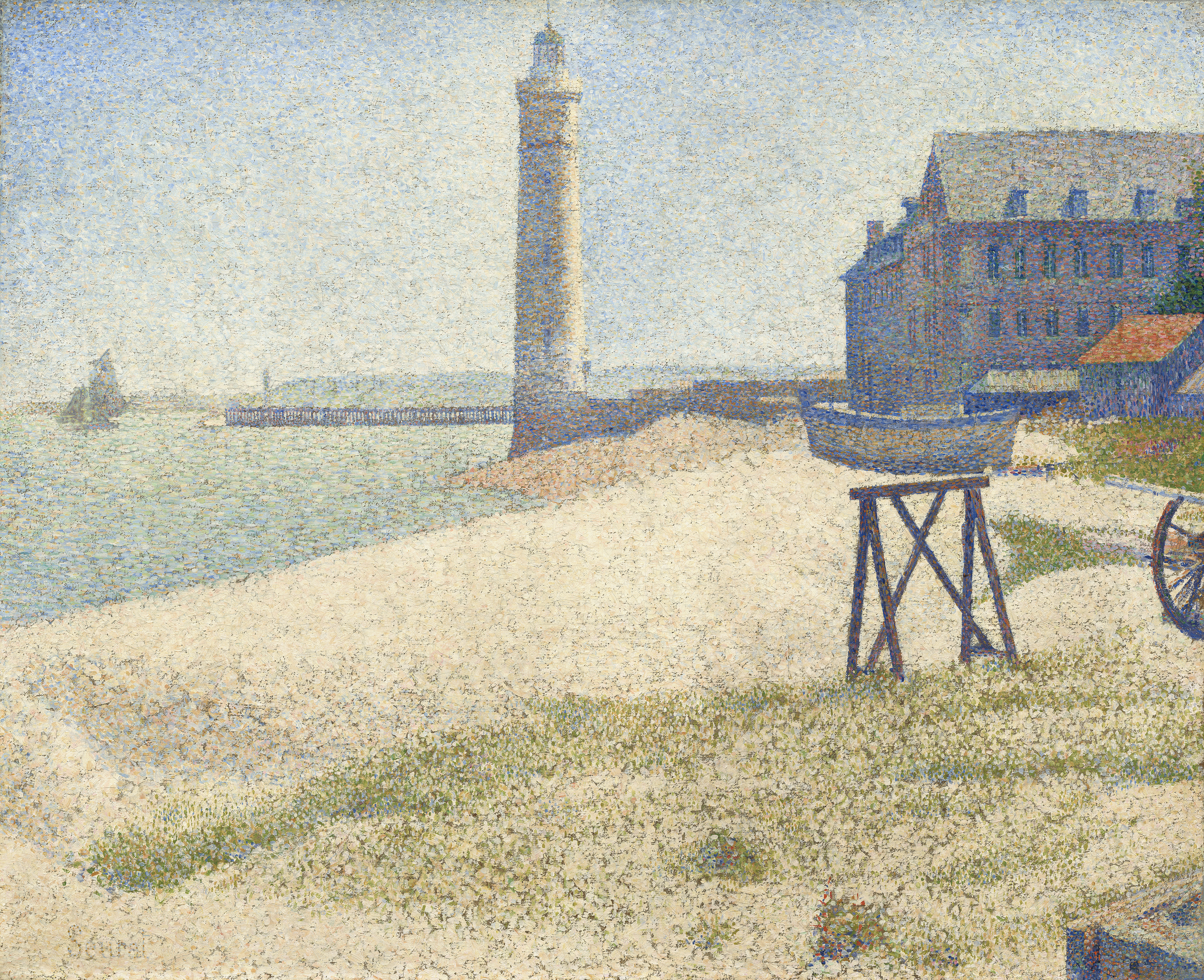
The Lighthouse at Honfleur by Georges Seurat, 1886

Honfleur is in the Norman département of Calvados in the traditional district of pays d'Auge. It is located on the southern bank of the estuary of the Seine, across from Le Havre and very close to the exit of the Pont de Normandie (nicknamed by the locals "Honfleur bridge"). The town is at the eastern extremity of the 40 km (25 mi) coastline called the Côte Fleurie (Flowery Coast).

Like most of northern France, Honfleur has an oceanic climate with warm summers, cool winters, rain all year round and few extremes of temperature.

== Population ==
The population has hovered between 6,600 and 10,000 since 1793. The inhabitants of Honfleur are called Honfleurais in French. In 1973 Honfleur absorbed the commune Vazouy (80 inhabitants in 2023). The population data in the table below refer to the commune of Honfleur proper, in its geography at the given years.

Historical population

Year	Pop.	±% p.a.
1793	9,256	—
1800	8,664	−0.94%
1806	9,724	+1.94%
1821	9,637	−0.06%
1831	8,888	−0.81%
1836	9,130	+0.54%
1841	9,580	+0.97%
1846	9,912	+0.68%
1851	9,361	−1.14%
1856	9,129	−0.50%
1861	9,553	+0.91%
1866	9,946	+0.81%
1872	9,061	−1.54%
1876	9,271	+0.57%
1881	9,601	+0.70%
1886	9,726	+0.26%
1891	9,450	−0.57%
1896	9,297	−0.33%
1901	9,610	+0.66%

Year	Pop.	±% p.a.
1906	9,451	−0.33%
1911	9,298	−0.33%
1921	8,707	−0.65%
1926	8,491	−0.50%
1931	8,031	−1.11%
1936	7,861	−0.43%
1946	7,931	+0.09%
1954	8,661	+1.11%
1962	9,141	+0.68%
1968	9,292	+0.27%
1975	9,188	−0.16%
1982	8,495	−1.11%
1990	8,272	−0.33%
1999	8,175	−0.13%
2007	8,163	−0.02%
2012	7,913	−0.62%
2017	7,425	−1.27%
2023	6,640	−1.85%

Source: EHESS and INSEE

== Administration ==
Honfleur is the seat of the canton of Honfleur-Deauville and of the communauté de communes du Pays de Honfleur-Beuzeville.

In 1973 Honfleur merged with the commune of Vasouy (former INSEE code 14725).

== Historic buildings ==
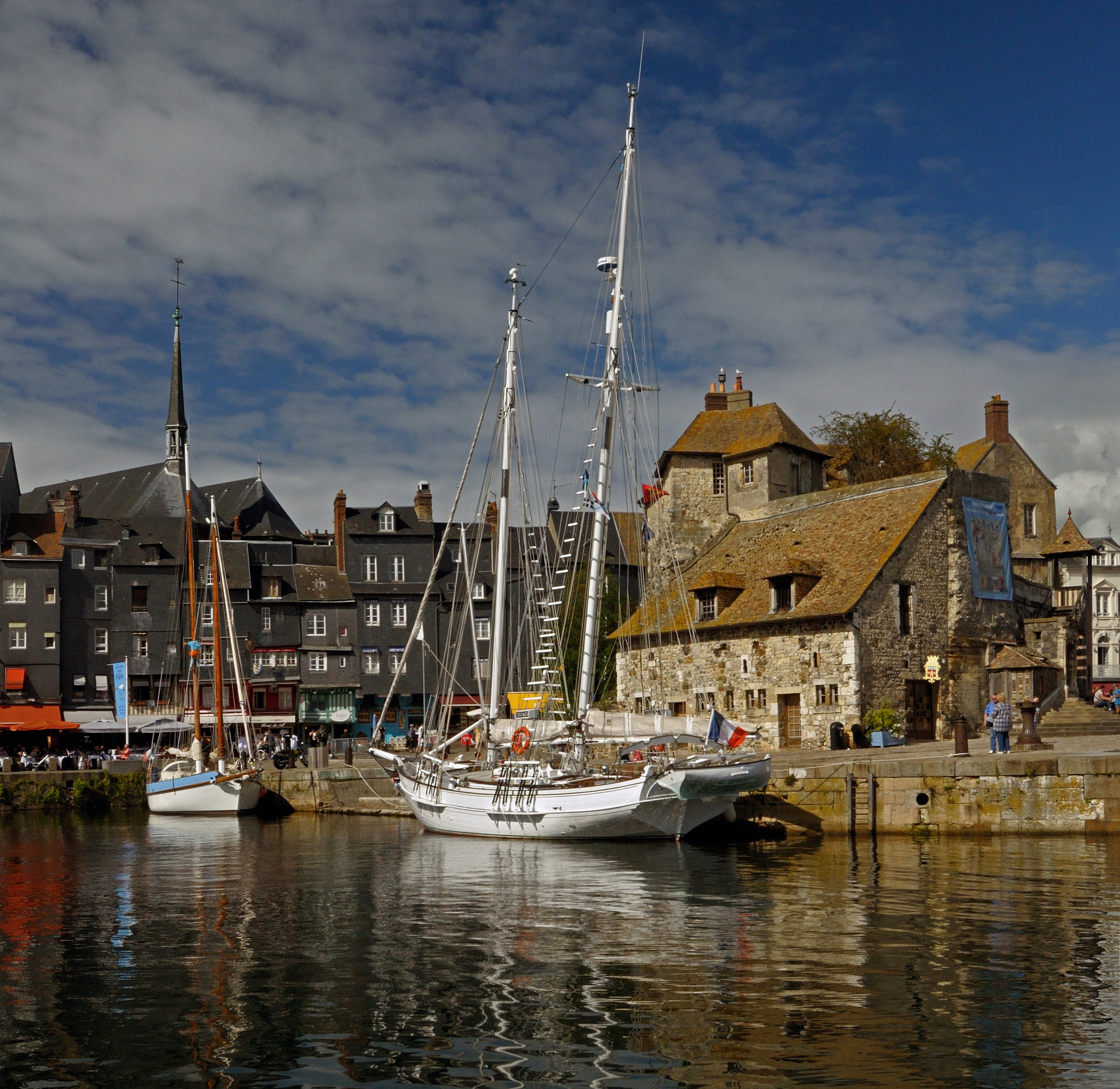
The old pier at Honfleur

- Église Saint-Léonard (St. Leonard's Church), with a flamboyant Gothic style façade and one bay that escaped the fire set by the calvinists in 1562. The rest of the building was rebuilt in the 17th. The interior is entirely painted in murals, including the visible wooden vaulting.
- The salt barns are two barns that remain out of three originals, one having been destroyed by fire. These two buildings contained 10,000 tonnes (11,000 tons) of salt for preserving the catch of this important fishing port. They were constructed in the 17th century, after the citizens received permission from Colbert. The bulk of the salt came from Brouage. The walls were constructed with great blocks of chalky limestone and wooden vaulting, which, being constructed by naval carpenters, evoke the hulls of vessels of the 17th century.
- Chapelle de Grâce (Grace Chapel) was reconstructed after the cliff collapsed. On the exterior, one can see pilgrimage carillon of 24 bells.
- Le cotre Sainte-Bernadette, the last crayfishing sloop which is still in shape to sail. It belongs to the La chaloupe d'Honfleur (Honfleur Sloop) association. It was enrolled as a historic monument of France (monuments historiques) as of 18 October 1983.
- Église Sainte-Catherine, built in the 15th century, is one of the largest wooden church in France.

== Museums ==
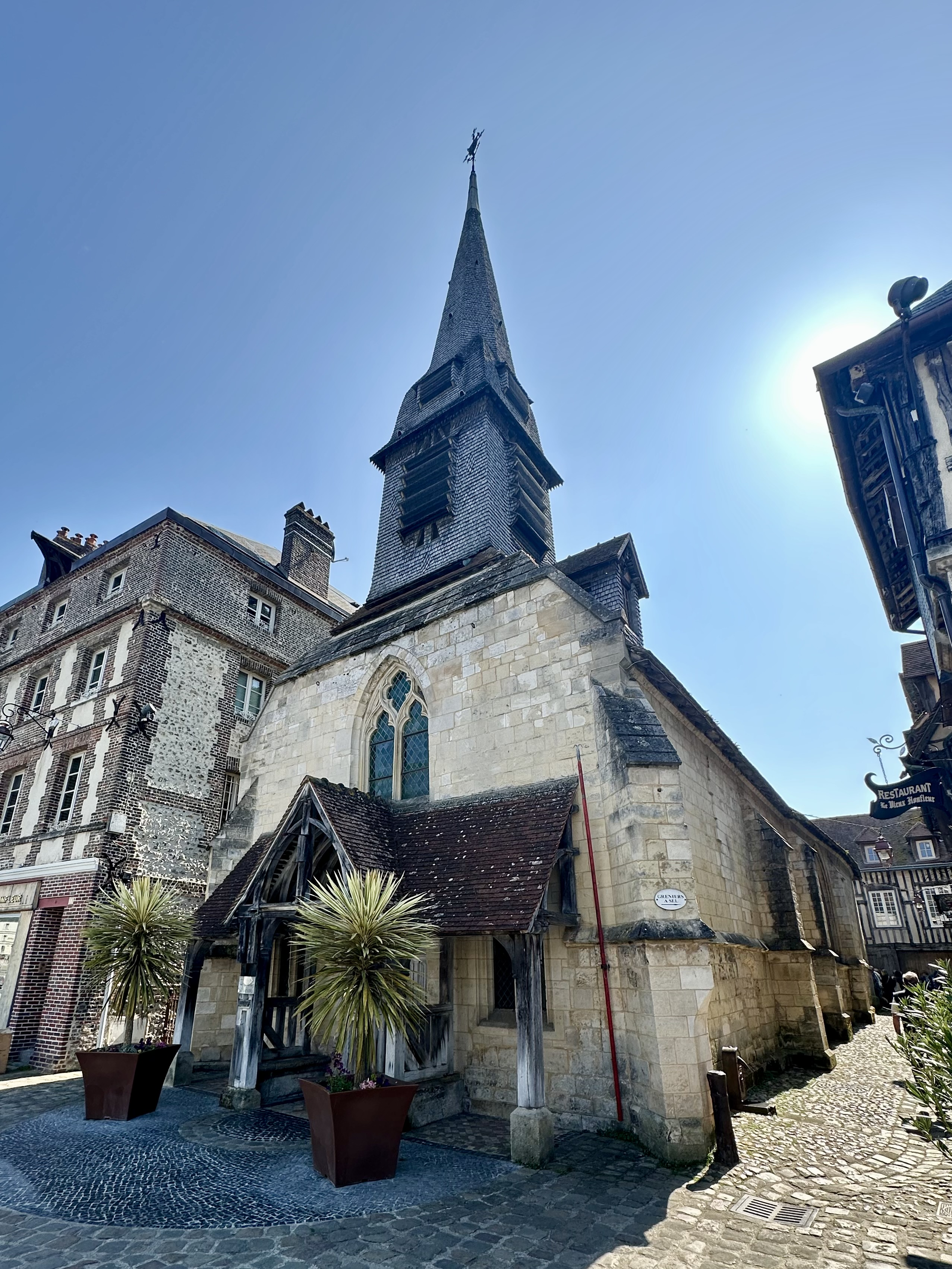
Église Saint-Étienne is now the Maritime Museum

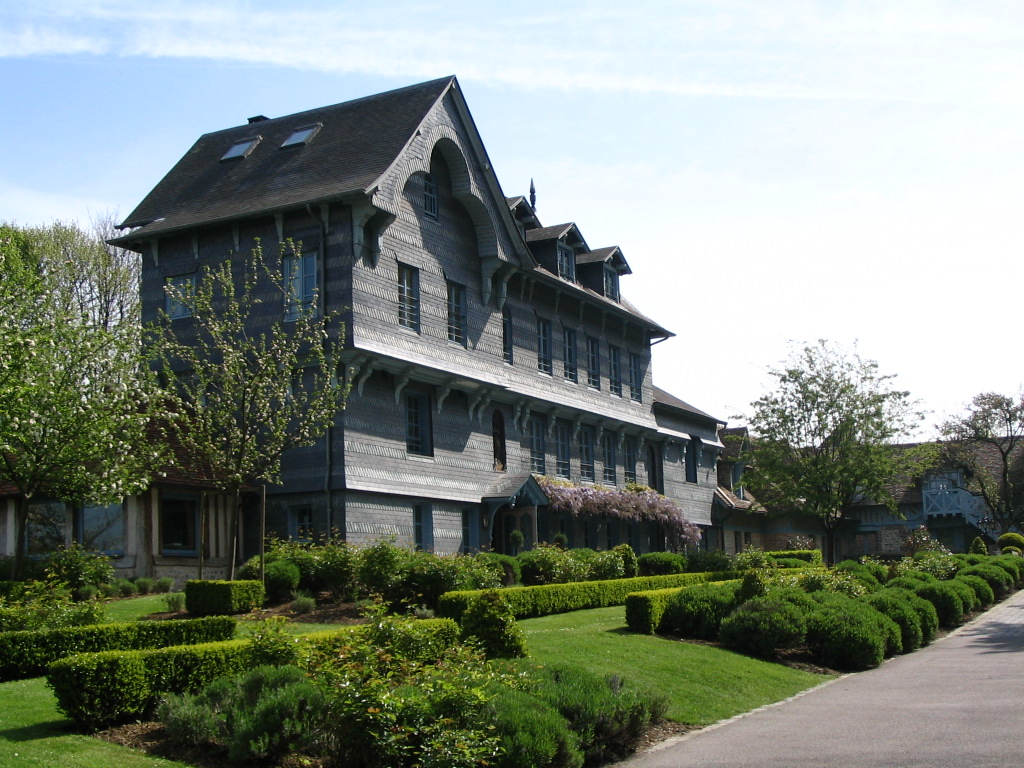
The farmhouse of Saint-Siméon, where Impressionist painters stayed

The Eugène Boudin museum is the main museum in Honfleur. Église Saint-Étienne (St. Stephen's Church) is an old parish church in Gothic style, dating in part to the 14th and 15th centuries. It is the oldest church in the city. It is constructed of chalk with flint and of Caen stone, the city of Honfleur being located at the border of those two calcareous rock formations. The bell tower is covered with a façade essentage of chestnut wood. Today, it has become the Maritime Museum.

Honfleur’s skies and landscapes once inspired artists, including Claude Monet and Eugène Boudin. The Boudin Museum guides the visitor through art history. La Forge is the house of Florence Marie, who was an artist. It also contains a garden and her art. There are different types of art including paintings, sculptures, and mosaïques. Marie's artistic eye is shown through the decorations on display at his house.

Naturospace is a lepidopterarium home to about 150 species of butterfly.

== Notable people ==
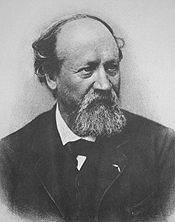
Eugène Boudin, ca.1880's

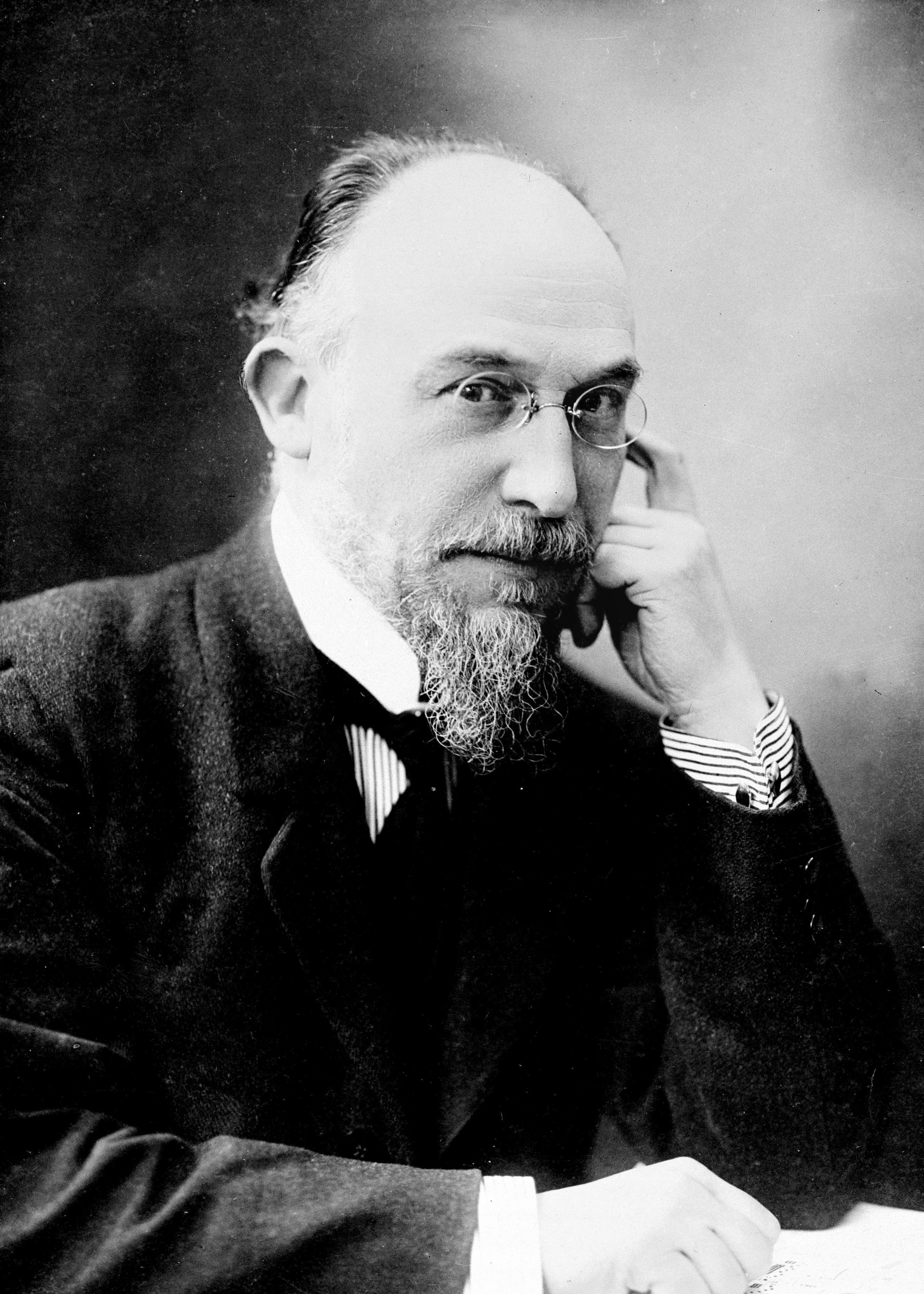
Eric Satie, 1920

- Eva Aeppli (1925-2015), artist, lived and died in Honfleur
- Alphonse Allais (1854–1905), writer and humourist
- Louis Andlauer (1876–1915), organist and composer
- Eugène Boudin (1824–1898), landscape painter.
- Marcel Caens (1919–2006), classical trumpeter
- Denis of the Nativity (1600–1638), (né Pierre Berthelot), Catholic martyr
- Michel Danino (born 1956), Hindutva author
- Jean Dries (1905-1973), painter and curator of the Museum Eugène Boudin
- Hugues Gall (born 1940), opera manager
- Jacques Félix Emmanuel Hamelin (1768–1839), rear admiral
- Sophie Mallebranche (born 1976), textile designer
- Christopher Rocancourt (born 1967), impostor and con artist
- Erik Satie (1866–1925), composer and musician
- Albert Sorel (1842–1906), a French historian.
- Pascal Lecocq (born 1958), fine art surrealist painter, workshop and gallery from 1988 to 2000.
- Félix Vallotton (1865–1925), painter with studio in Honfleur

== Twin towns – sister cities ==
Honfleur is twinned with:

- Burlington, United States
- Plyos, Russia
- Sandwich, England, United Kingdom
- Visé, Belgium
- Wörth am Main, Germany

== See also ==
- Port of Honfleur
- Communes of the Calvados department
