= Roche Bobois =

French furniture company

- Type: Public
- Traded as: Euronext Paris: RBO; CAC All-Share
- ISIN: FR0013344173
- Industry: Furniture design and retail
- Founded: 1960; 66 years ago
- Founders: François Roche and Chouchan families
- Headquarters: Paris, France
- Key people: Guillaume Demulier (president); Jean-Éric Chouchan (chairman of the supervisory board); Éric Amourdedieu (managing director); Nicolas Roche (director of collections); Martin Gleize (international director)
- Products: Furniture and accessories
- Operating income: 334 million euros (2021)
- Number of employees: 800
- Website: www.roche-bobois.com

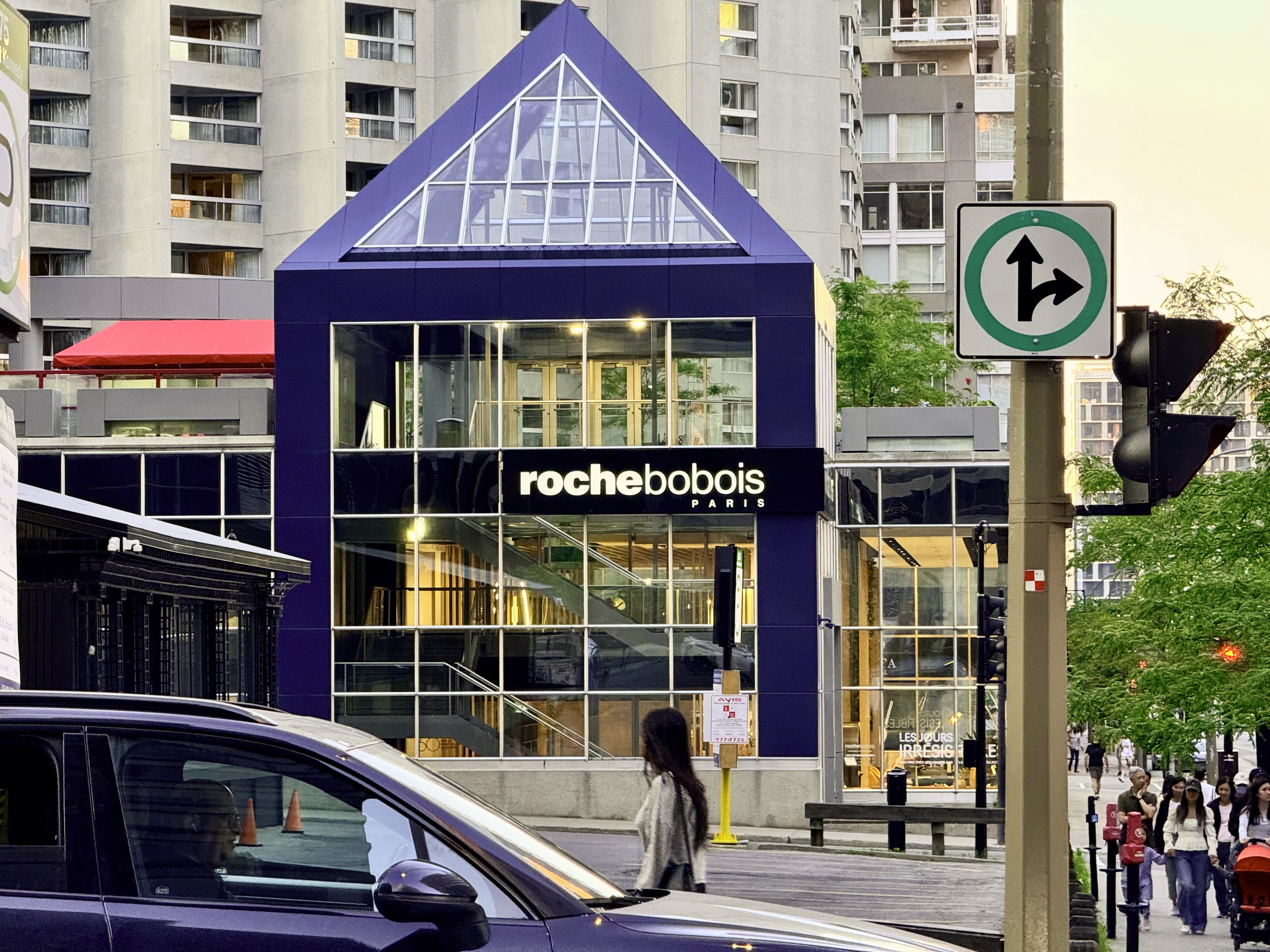
A Roche Bobois store in Montreal, Quebec, Canada

Roche Bobois (French pronunciation: [ʁɔʃ bɔbwa]; stylized as roche bobois) is a French company which designs and retails furniture and home accessories.

== History ==
In 1960, having become acquainted at the Copenhagen Furniture Fair, Philippe and François Roche joined forces with Jean-Claude and Patrick Chouchan to import Scandinavian furniture to Paris. Soon after, they added Scandinavian giftware, such as textiles, tableware and tapestries to their furniture ranges. Known as 'complementary objects', these accessories were sold in adjoining boutiques.

1961: The first joint national advertising campaign was launched in Elle magazine. Two campaigns a year have been created every year since, over a period of nearly 50 years. Creation of the first joint catalogue and development of a joint national network of franchises based on retail alone with no ownership of manufacturing resources, a revolutionary business model at the time.

In 1970, Philippe Roche and colleagues meet designer Hans Hopfer while on a trip to Germany. The latter's design for a sofa that allows you to 'live at ground level', initially named 'Lounge', has, under its newer name 'Mah Jong', been Roche Bobois's best-selling sofa design since 1990. Roche Bobois Mah Jong

1974: Opening of the first Roche Bobois showroom in the US. and in Spain.

2009: A series of theme-based Design Competitions aimed at supporting emerging talent is launched. The first competition, organized in China, results in the design and manufacture of the gas-injection moulded Ava: created by a Chinese designer and fabricated by an Italian manufacturer. Subsequently, competitions have taken place in Morocco and most recently in the UK (winner to be announced shortly).

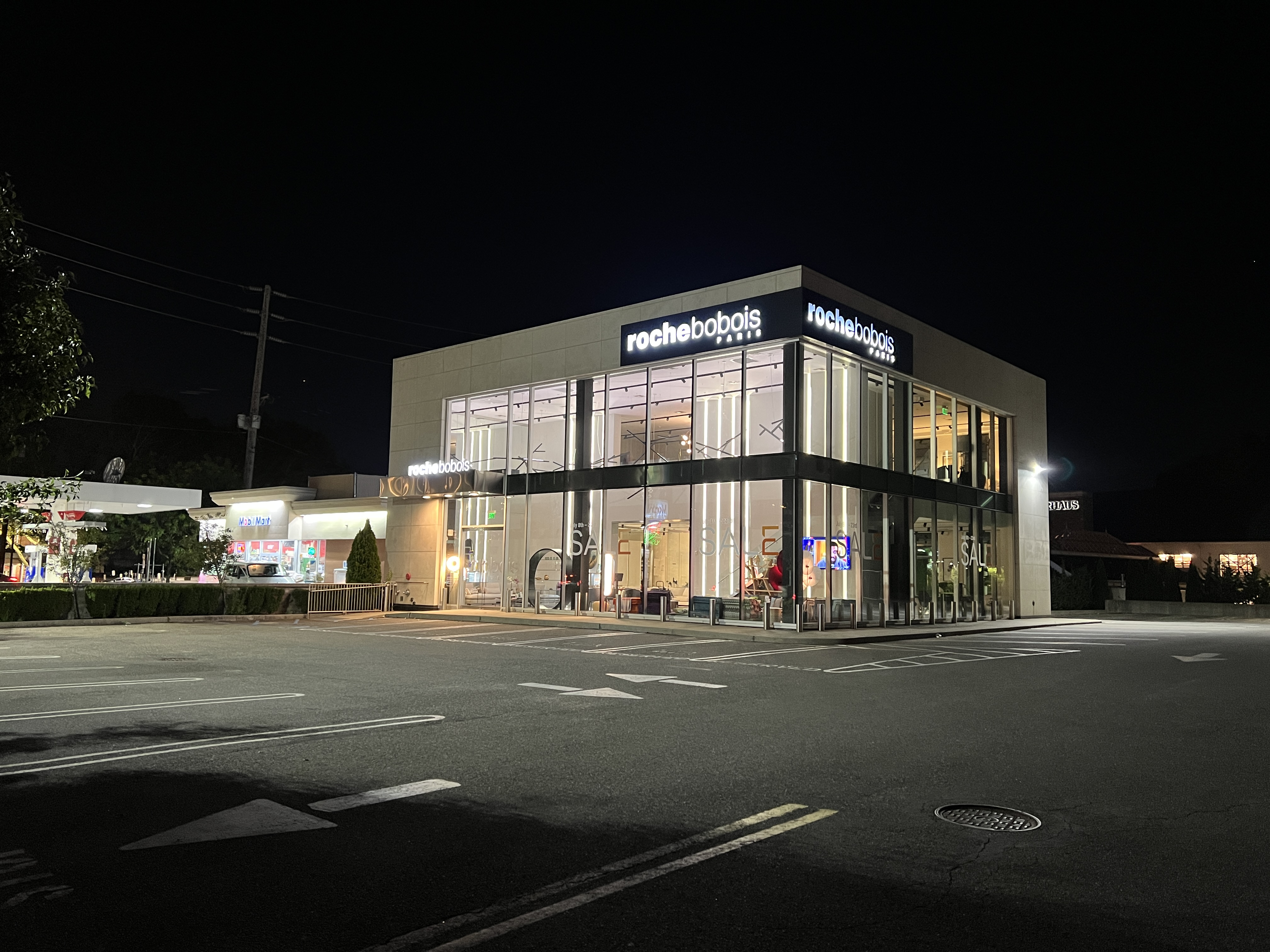
A Roche Bobois store in Flower Hill, New York.

In 2013, Roche Bobois further reinforced its international presence with a scheduled program of 15 new showroom openings in more than 10 countries, including Singapore, Colombia, Indonesia and Bulgaria.

== Designers ==
Roche Bobois works in collaboration with a number of designers and architects to create its collections.

In the 1980s, Hans Hopfer and Italian architect Luigi Gorgoni worked with the brand.

Again, in the 2000s, collaborations include:

- The Métropolis Collection created by Iosa Ghini to celebrate Roche Bobois's 40th anniversary
- The Ping Pong Collection by Paola Navone
- The Comète sofa by Vladimir Kagan
- The Rive Droite Collection by Christophe Delcourt, who subsequently created the Legend bookcase
- The Speed Up range by Sacha Lakic
- Cute Cut coffee tables by Cédric Ragot
- The Furtif Collection by Daniel Rode
- The Assemblage Collection by Stéphan Lebrun
- The Ora Ito Collection of furniture

A number of these collections were presented at the Mobi Boom exhibition at the Musée des Arts Décoratifs of Paris. Fashion designers, too, have added their mark to Roche Bobois: Kenzo, Missoni, Ungaro, Jean Paul Gaultier and Sonia Rykiel and Christian Lacroix.

== Notes and references ==
The information on this page is partially translated from the equivalent page in French
