= Observeur du Design =

- Description: Promoting design as a factor in business competitiveness and innovation
- Country: France
- Presented by: APCI (Agency for the Promotion of Industrial Creation)

Observeur du Design is an award created by APCI to promote design as a key factor in business competitiveness as well as economic, social and cultural innovation.

The APCI develops permanent promotional and design actions, fulfilling specific actions on its partners’ request or of its own initiative.
