= Tokyo Designers Block =

Tokyo Designers Block (TDB) is one of Tokyo's main recurring design events. It is a 5-day exhibition showcasing hundreds of international and domestic designers of all backgrounds. Works are displayed all through Tokyo's fashionable districts, in shop windows, exhibition spaces and galleries.

TDB is the brainchild of Teruo Kurosaki, president of Aoyama design shop Idée, who got the idea following a visit to London's designersblock. "TDB is not a design event nor a trade show of product designs; we are willing to make fun of design and try the best how design can do to the society in Tokyo."

== History ==
- 2000 (12–15 October) "Form follows your mind"
- 2001 (10–14 October) "Design makes cities"
- 2002 (10–14 October) "Design has no boundaries"
- 2003 (9–13 October) "Anything goes design flows 2003"
- 2004 (7–11 October) "1968 revolutions"
- 2006 (31 October – 5 November) "100% design tokyo"
