= Daniel Lalonde =

Canadian businessperson (born 1963)

- Born: 1963 (age 62–63); Cornwall, Ontario, Canada
- Education: University of Waterloo, INSEAD Business School
- Occupation: Business executive
- Years active: 1990s-present
- Employer: Design Holding (CEO)
- Board member of: INSEAD

Daniel Lalonde (born 1963) is a Canadian businessperson known for heading brands such as Louis Vuitton, Ralph Lauren, SMCP Group, Nespresso and Moët & Chandon. After starting his management career with companies such as Häagen-Dazs and Nespresso, he spent ten years at LVMH as president and CEO of LVMH Watches & Jewelry North America, Louis Vuitton in North America, and Moët & Chandon globally. After eight years as CEO of SMCP Group, he was named CEO of Design Holding. He studied mathematics at the University of Waterloo and earned a Master of Business Administration from INSEAD Business School.

== Early life and education ==
Daniel Lalonde was born in 1963 in Cornwall, Ontario. Lalonde's mother worked as a nurse, while his father was a teacher. Fluent in both English and French, Lalonde spent his youth in Cornwall and attended École secondaire catholique La Citadelle with aspirations to become a professional hockey player. He studied mathematics at the University of Waterloo in Waterloo, Ontario, earning a Bachelor of Mathematics and graduating with honors. After working in Toronto for a consulting firm, he moved to France to study business administration at the INSEAD Business School. He graduated with a Master of Business Administration in 1991.

== Career ==
=== Early consulting ===
Lalonde remained in Paris after graduating from INSEAD, initially working at a management consultancy firm and at Rothschilds. He "made a name for himself" as managing director of Häagen-Dazs Europe's retail-store division, where he quickly "developed a network of 130 stores in 12 countries, tripling the business." In the mid-1990s, helped launch Nestle's Nespresso brand in North America, serving as Nespresso North America's president and CEO. He also spent five years as Nespresso's global chief operating officer (COO) while based in Switzerland. According to The New York Sun, Lalonde is credited with "[raising] annual sales from $25 million in five countries to $360 million in 30 countries," with Nespresso reaching "the no. 1 position in global sales for four straight years" during his tenure.

=== LVMH ===
In 2002, he was hired by LVMH (Louis Vuitton Moët Hennessy) as president and CEO of LVMH Watches & Jewelry in North America, overseeing brands such as Christian Dior, Chaumet, Zenith, OMAS, and De Beers LV. His first major task at LVMH was to improve lagging sales for the TAG Heuer watch brand; Lalonde focused on "superaffluent" markets, such as the golf community in North America, and redesigned the company's customer service and retail strategies. He also recruited celebrities, such as Tiger Woods, Uma Thurman, Maria Sharapova, and Brad Pitt to take part in watch campaigns photographed by Patrick Demarchelier, with Woods' recruitment as a brand ambassador reportedly leading to a 30% increase in sales. Under Lalonde, TAG Heuer's sales represented over "50% of the growth in the luxury watch market" in the United States in 2004 and, by 2005, TAG Heuer was rated as the No. 2 luxury watch brand.

Lalonde served as president and CEO of Louis Vuitton North America from 2006 to 2010, and in five years turned LV into the number one luxury brand on the market, thanks to strong strategic moves, new flagship stores, the launch of E-commerce and creative partnerships.

then returned to France to become the global CEO for LVMH brands Moët and Dom Pérignon. In 2010, he became global CEO and president of Moët & Chandon and, in July 2010, was named president and CEO of both Moët & Chandon and Dom Pérignon worldwide.

=== Ralph Lauren ===
After ten years at LVMH, Lalonde became president of Ralph Lauren International in January 2012, in what was a newly created position. He announced his departure from Ralph Lauren in December 2013.

=== SMCP ===
In May 2014, he became the president and chief executive officer of SMCP Group (Sandro - Maje - Claudie Pierlot), an internationally expanding French luxury fashion company in which he also became an investor. During his first year of leading SMCP, Lalonde travelled extensively in Asia, the Middle East, the United States, and Europe, with the company posting a 19.2 percent rise in sales for the first half of 2016. Under Lalonde leadership, SMCP became a leading player in accessible luxury through a global expansion and a strategic multi-channel approach including digital transformation and a publicly traded company on the Paris Stock Exchange in October 2017 with a valuation of US$2.5 billion at its IPO. In June 2019, after having reported revenues of 1 billion euros for 2018; Lalonde announced that SMCP will acquire French menswear "Accessible Luxury" label De Fursac, with international expansion planned for the brand.

He departed SMCP and was appointed as Chief Executive Officer (CEO) of Design Holding in August 2021.

=== Design Holding ===
Appointed in August 2021 and based in Milan, in October 2021 Lalonde began his current role at Design Holding, a global leader in high-end design that encompasses a portfolio of brands including B&B Italia, Flos, Louis Poulsen, Maxalto, Arclinea, Azucena, Fendi Casa, Audo and Lumens. He drives the strategic growth trajectory for the Group, which is jointly owned by investment firms Investindustrial and Carlyle Group.

Since joining Design Holding, with extensive experience acquired in the luxury goods sector, Lalonde has begun implementing strategic moves to expand the company’s global leadership and footprint including the acquisition of Designers Company (a Danish group that includes Audo, developed by uniting MENU and by Lassen brands) in May 2022. Lalonde has also put sustainability at the core of the Group’s mission, developing a strong purpose-centric strategy for achieving fully sustainable design highlighted in the first Sustainability Report of the Group released in July 2022.

In 2024 Design Holding rebranded as Flos B&B Italia Group.

=== Affiliations ===
Lalonde serves on the board of INSEAD, his alma mater, and has lectured at institutions such as Harvard Business School and Columbia University.

He currently serves as Director on the Boards of Design Holding, PUIG SA, a global leader in beauty and fashion, and Altagamma.

== Personal life ==
Currently lives in Milan with his wife Yvonne. The couple have three children. He travels between New York, Paris, and Toronto. He has interests in vintage wine and oenology with private cellars in Paris.
