= Flos B&B Italia Group =

Global design conglomerate

- Industry: High-end design furniture and lighting
- Founded: 2018
- Headquarters: Milan, Milan, Italy
- Key people: Daniel Lalonde (CEO), Piero Gandini (Executive chairman)
- Brands: FLOS, B&B Italia, Louis Poulsen, Maxalto, Arclinea, Azucena, FENDI Casa, Audo Copenhagen, Lumens
- Revenue: €898.6 million (2023 GMV revenues)
- Number of employees: ~ 2160 Employees (June 2024)
- Website: https://www.flosbebitaliagroup.com/

Flos B&B Italia Group (formerly Design Holding) is a global conglomerate in high-end design that encompasses a portfolio of brands including B&B Italia, Flos, Louis Poulsen, Maxalto, Arclinea, Azucena, Fendi Casa, Audo and Lumens.

Daniel Lalonde became the CEO of Flos B&B Italia Group in August 2021; in January 2025, the group announced the appointment of Piero Gandini as Executive Chairman, taking over the role from Daniel Lalonde to focus on governance and international growth.

Flos B&B Italia Group is jointly owned by investment firms Investindustrial and Carlyle Group.

== History ==
Flos B&B Italia Group, founded in November 2018 and jointly owned by investment companies affiliated with Investindustrial and The Carlyle Group, was renamed from Design Holding in May 2024. According to a company press release, the rebranding was intended to align the corporate name with its constituent brands. In November 2018, Flos, Louis Poulsen, and B&B Italia Group (including B&B Italia, Maxalto, Azucena, and Arclinea) joined to form what would become Flos B&B Italia Group with the aim of creating a group operating in the furnishings and lighting sectors. In April 2021, the group acquired Lumens – formerly YDesign Group, a US-based online retailer of lighting and home furnishings; in May 2021, the group and FENDI announced the launch of the joint venture Fashion Furniture Design (FF Design) to develop the FENDI Casa business. In 2022, the group acquired Designers Company, a Danish group that includes brands such as Menu and by Lassen, with a presence in the Northern European and US design market and offering a range of products including furniture, lighting, and accessories. In 2023, the furniture brands Menu and By Lassen merged to form a new design brand called Audo Copenhagen. The new brand was launched on June 1 and named after Menu's Copenhagen showroom The Audo, which was rebranded as Audo House and serves as Audo Copenhagen's headquarters.

== Brands ==
Flos B&B Italia Group manages a portfolio of brands it has acquired since 2018, expanding to include 10 brands as of 2024. Among these brands are B&B Italia, Flos, Louis Poulsen, Maxalto, Azucena, Arclinea, FENDI Casa, Audo, and Lumens.

=== B&B Italia ===
B&B Italia, founded in 1966 by Piero Ambrogio Busnelli, is an Italian furniture manufacturer. According to company materials, it focuses on contemporary design and research and development. The company has collaborated with designers including Antonio Citterio, Piero Lissoni, Mario Bellini, Gaetano Pesce, Naoto Fukasawa, Patricia Urquiola, Barber & Osgerby, Doshi Levien, Michael Anastassiades, Monica Armani, Zaha Hadid, Foster+Partners, and others.

=== Flos ===
Flos is an Italian company specializing in both indoor and outdoor lighting, founded in Merano in 1962. The company originated from the collaboration between Dino Gavina and Cesare Cassina with Arturo Eisenkeil, who introduced a new coating material from the USA. Some of the company's products are displayed at the MoMA in New York.

The company has collaborated with designers such as Achille & Pier Giacomo Castiglioni, Antonio Citterio, Jasper Morrison, Patricia Urquiola, Phillipe Starck, Vincent Van Duysen, Michael Anastassiades, Marc Newson, Konstantin Grcic, and others.

=== Louis Poulsen ===
Louis Poulsen, established in 1874, is a lighting company that produces both interior and exterior lighting fixtures. It has a connection to Danish design, with contributions from designers such as Poul Henningsen, Arne Jacobsen, Vilhelm Lauritzen, and Verner Panton. The company also collaborates with contemporary designers, including Christian Flindt, Shoichi Uchiyama, Louise Campbell, Øivind Slaatto, Alfred Homann, Oki Sato, Olafur Eliasson, and Anne Boysen.

=== Maxalto ===
Maxalto, founded in 1975, is a brand within the Group, designed and coordinated by Italian designer Antonio Citterio. The brand's approach is described as 'modern neo-classic', combining traditional and contemporary elements.

=== Azucena ===
In 2018, B&B Italia Group acquired the Italian brand Azucena, founded in 1947 by architects Luigi Caccia Dominioni, Ignazio Gardella, and Corrado Corradi Dell'Acqua. The Azucena brand produces and markets a collection that reissues more than 20 products including the Catilina chair, the ABCD and Toro chairs, the Monachella lamp, and the Cavalletto table, available in selected stores in Italy and abroad.

=== Arclinea ===
Arclinea Arredamenti S.p.A., founded by Silvio Fortuna in Caldogno in 1925, began as an artisanal laboratory specializing in wood-processing and has developed in the field of design kitchens. Arclinea operates in both retail and contract with the divisions: residential, hospitality, marine.

=== FENDI Casa ===
Fendi, founded in Rome in 1925, has become an internationally recognized luxury brand. In May 2021, Flos B&B Italia Group and FENDI formed a joint venture called Fashion Furniture Design (FF Design) to develop the FENDI Casa business, with Flos B&B Italia Group holding the majority share. According to official statements, this partnership aims to enhance FENDI's home segment by leveraging the expertise of Flos B&B Italia Group. The collaboration focuses on designing, manufacturing, and distributing collections that reflect the essence of the Maison.

=== Audo ===
Audo is a Danish design brand that sells contemporary furniture, lighting, and accessories in the premium segment to professionals and retail customers in more than 50 countries. According to company sources, Audo reflects both a century of Danish design tradition and a modern, global outlook that is continually expanding and evolving.

=== Lumens ===
Founded in the San Francisco Bay Area in 2021 and incorporating the heritage of YLighting, Lumens is an online retailer of lighting, furniture, and accessories, offering a selection of modern designs from over 300 brands.

== Designers ==
Flos B&B Italia Group's catalog includes objects designed by international designers including Achille and Pier Giacomo Castiglioni, Tobia Scarpa, Luigi Caccia Dominioni, Poul Henningsen, Arne Jacobsen, Antonio Citterio, Gaetano Pesce, Philippe Starck, Piero Lissoni, Konstantin Grcic, Jasper Morrison, Patricia Urquiola, Michael Anastassiades, and others.

== Sustainability ==
According to its corporate materials, Flos B&B Italia Group incorporates sustainability in its design philosophy, stating that it aims to balance aesthetic considerations with sustainable practices. The company reports that it considers environmental impact and community interests in its design process.

=== Environmental Initiatives ===
According to its sustainability report, Flos B&B Italia Group states that it implements environmentally responsible approaches across its operations, from production lines to office activities. This involves integrating eco-design and circularity principles across their product design and engineering processes, monitoring ESG risks, and implementing climate change mitigation strategies throughout the value chain.

=== Personnel Policies ===
According to company communications, the group values diversity, equity, and inclusion within the workforce and the communities where it operates. Additionally, the company reports offering opportunities for professional growth, with the goal of improving employee well-being through flexible work policies and personal development programs.

=== Cultural Initiatives ===
The group states that it values the identities of its brands and their connections to local communities. According to company materials, it collaborates with local artisans and promotes sustainable practices to preserve cultural traditions and support the local economy.
