= Poltrona Frau =

Italian furniture manufacturer

- Type: Società per azioni, public Borsa Italiana: PFG
- Industry: Furniture and automotive Interiors
- Founded: 1912 (114 years ago) by Renzo Frau
- Headquarters: Tolentino, Marche, Italy
- Key people: Nicola Coropulis
- Products: Leather seating
- Revenue: 202 mln € (2022)
- Owner: Haworth Group (controlling interest)
- Website: poltronafrau.com

Poltrona Frau is a furniture-maker founded in 1912 by Sardinian-born Renzo Frau in Turin, Italy, headquartered since the early 1960s in Tolentino and specializing in leather seating for interior and automotive applications. The company name combines poltrona, the Italian word for 'armchair', and Frau, the last name of its founder.

The company uses a 21-step leather tanning process (vs. industry standard ranging from 12–15 steps) where the full-grain leather is dyed through, so a surface scratch won’t reveal a lining underneath. 95% of the company's products are made by hand.

In 2014, U.S.–based Haworth Group purchased a controlling interest in Poltrona Frau.

== Furniture ==
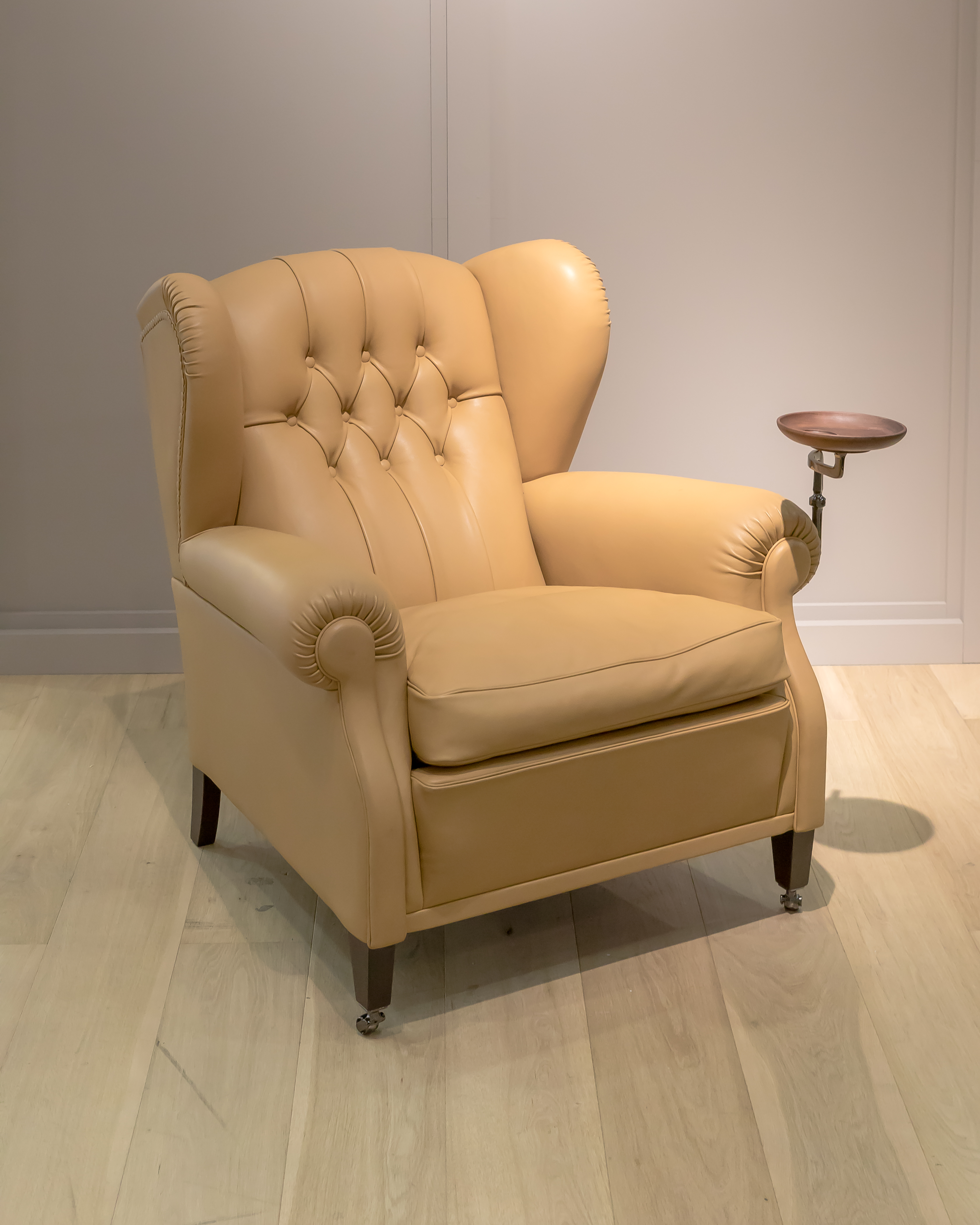
Poltrona Frau armchair with drinks tray

In 2006, the company marketed a knock down version of its Viking chair at their SoHo, New York store.

Beginning in 2011, the company marketed a sofa designed by French architect and designer Jean-Marie Massaud—called the John-John sofa, in tribute to John F. Kennedy Jr.—followed in 2012 by the John-John bed. In 2013, the company designed and manufactured 600 seats for the Arena Corinthians in São Paulo, Brazil, the first time the company produced seats for a football stadium.

In 2012, the company held a design competition to celebrate its centenary. The competition was won by British designer Benjamin Hubert.

== Transportation seating ==
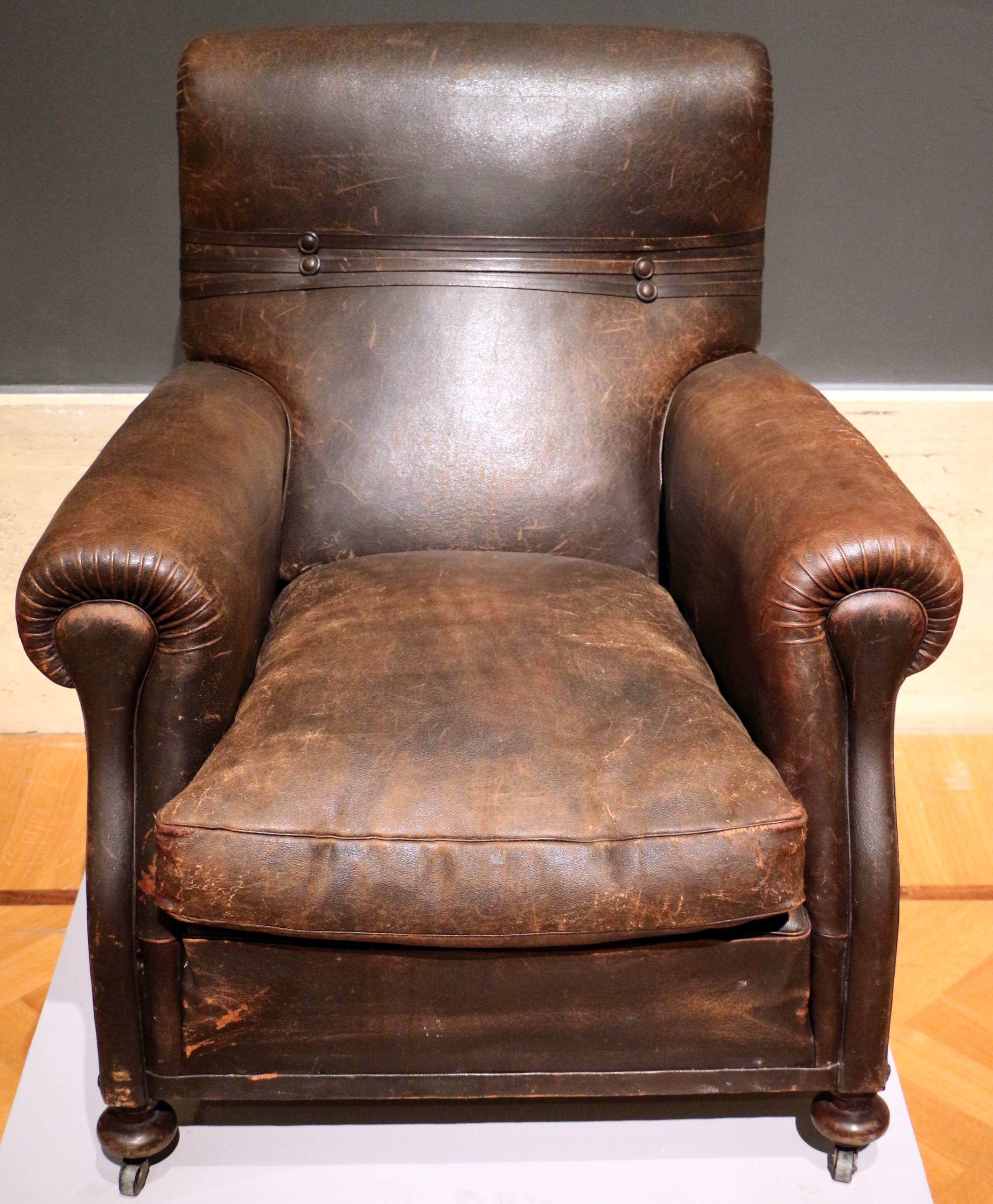
Model 177, 1915

In addition to designing seating for yachts, airplanes and helicopters, Poltrona Frau has designed leather interiors for automobiles since 1986, when Lancia asked the company to design and manufacture interiors for their new version 8.32 Thema model. Poltrona Frau has since made interiors from automotive companies ranging from Alfa Romeo, Audi, Bugatti, Lancia, Ferrari and Maserati to Mini, Fiat, Infiniti, Jaguar and Chrysler.

In 2002 the company's leathersmiths created red leather seating and pillions for a special edition of the California model of noted Italian motorcycle manufacturer Moto Guzzi, in celebration of the company's 80th anniversary.

== Museum ==
To mark its centennial in 2012, the company opened the Poltrona Frau Museum, designed by Italian architect Michele De Lucchi, formerly of the Memphis Group, at the company's headquarters and production facility in Tolentino.

The museum features approximately sixty of the company's furniture pieces, many from the collection of board chairman Franco Moschini, and organizes the company's history and production with examples of furniture, drawings, images and manufacturing materials in a 1400 square meter building under the theme “l’intelligenza delle mani," which translates "intelligence of the hands," or roughly "manual know-how".

A primary video gallery highlights a technical glossary of the company: nine hand tools, methods and materials—including the curved needle, nails, horsehair, quilting and the hammer—the tools and materials required to fold, stitch, attach and work leather.

== See also ==
- List of Italian companies
