= Paolo Piva =

Italian architect and designer

Paolo Piva (13 March 1950 − 6 July 2017) was an Italian architect and designer.

== Biography ==
Paolo Piva was born on 13 March 1950, in Adria in the Veneto region of Northern Italy. He studied architecture under Prof. Carlo Scarpa in Venice.

He worked as an architect and created designs for renowned furniture companies, such as Poliform/Varenna, De Sede, B&B Italia and Wittmann Austria.

Since 1988, Piva was Professor for Industrial Design at the University of Applied Arts Vienna. He worked and lived in Venice and Vienna and Biella, Piedmont.

Piva died on 6 July 2017 in Vienna.

== Publications ==
- "I secoli di Polirone. Committenza e produzione artistica di un monastero benedettino", Senza editore 1981 (it)
- "Paolo Piva. Design und Architektur", Residenz 1997, ISBN 978-3701707003 (en)
- "Architektur & Design", Residenz 1999, ISBN 978-3701711376 (en)
- "ID 1 - Industrial Design", Jung und Jung, 2011, ISBN 978-3902497956 (de)
- "Houses & Homes", Jung und Jung, 2013, ISBN 978-3990270370 (en)
