= Gaetano Pesce =

Italian architect (1939–2024)

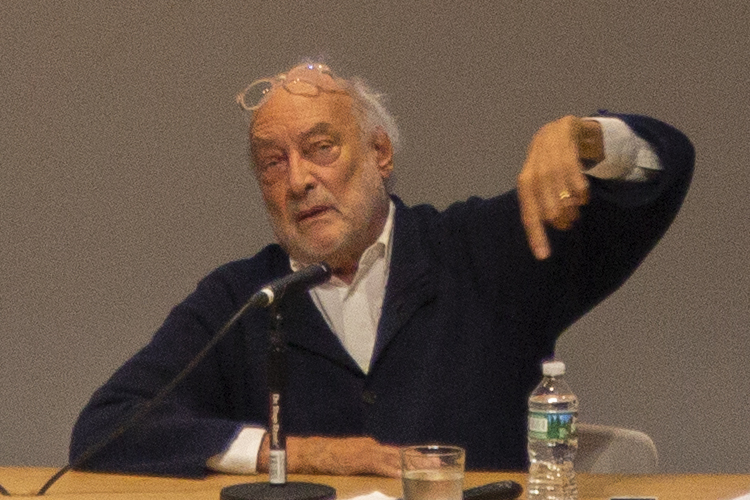
- Pesce in 2018
- Born: 8 November 1939; La Spezia, Italy
- Died: 3 April 2024 (aged 84); New York City, U.S.
- Occupation: Architect
- Spouse: Francesca Lucco
- Children: Milena, Jacopo (Tato) Pesce
- Parent(s): Alda Giungi, Vittorio Pesce
- Practice: Architect, designer, educator
- Buildings: Organic Buinding Osaka, Japan

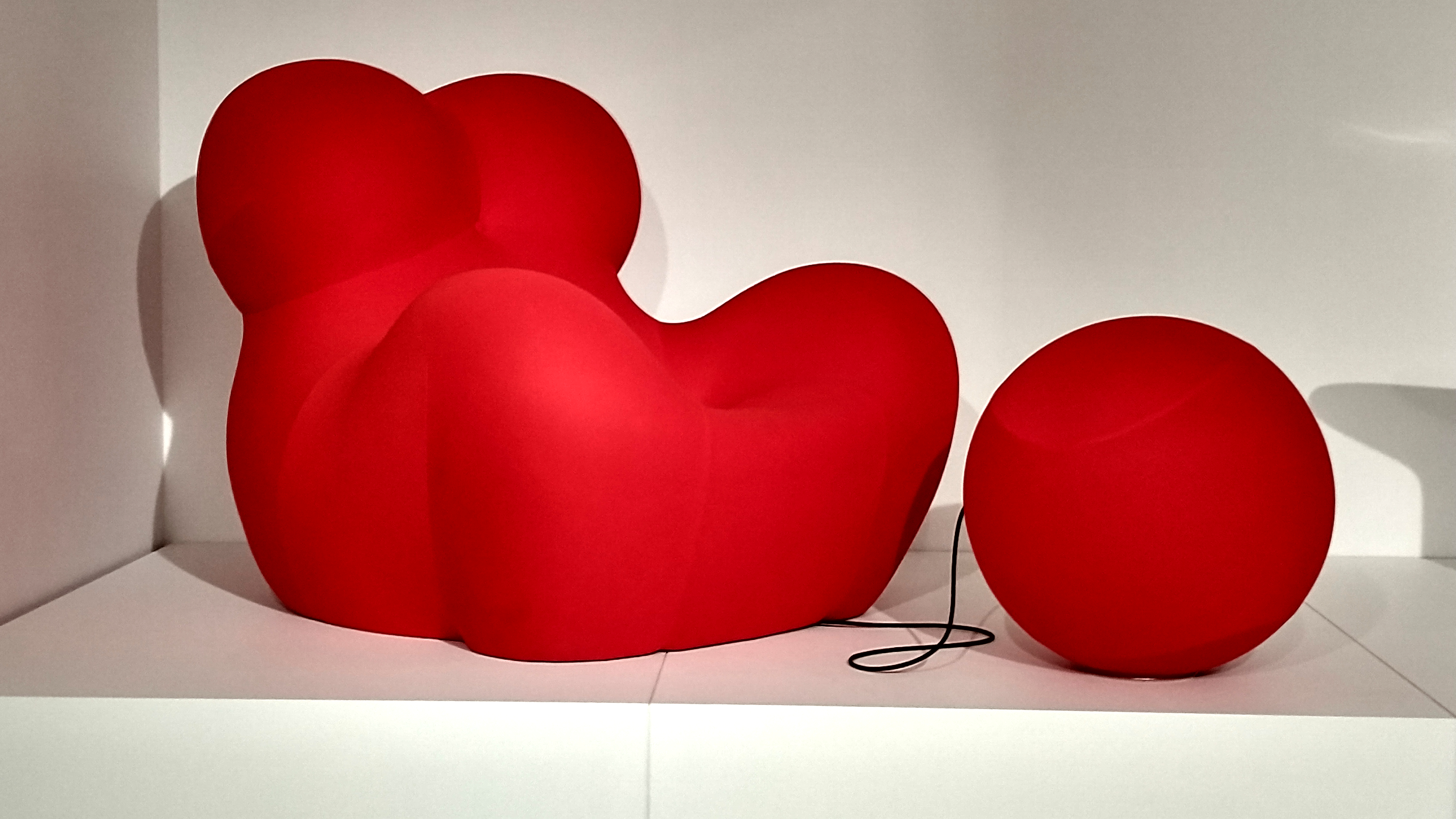
Up chair with ottoman for C&B Italia (1969)

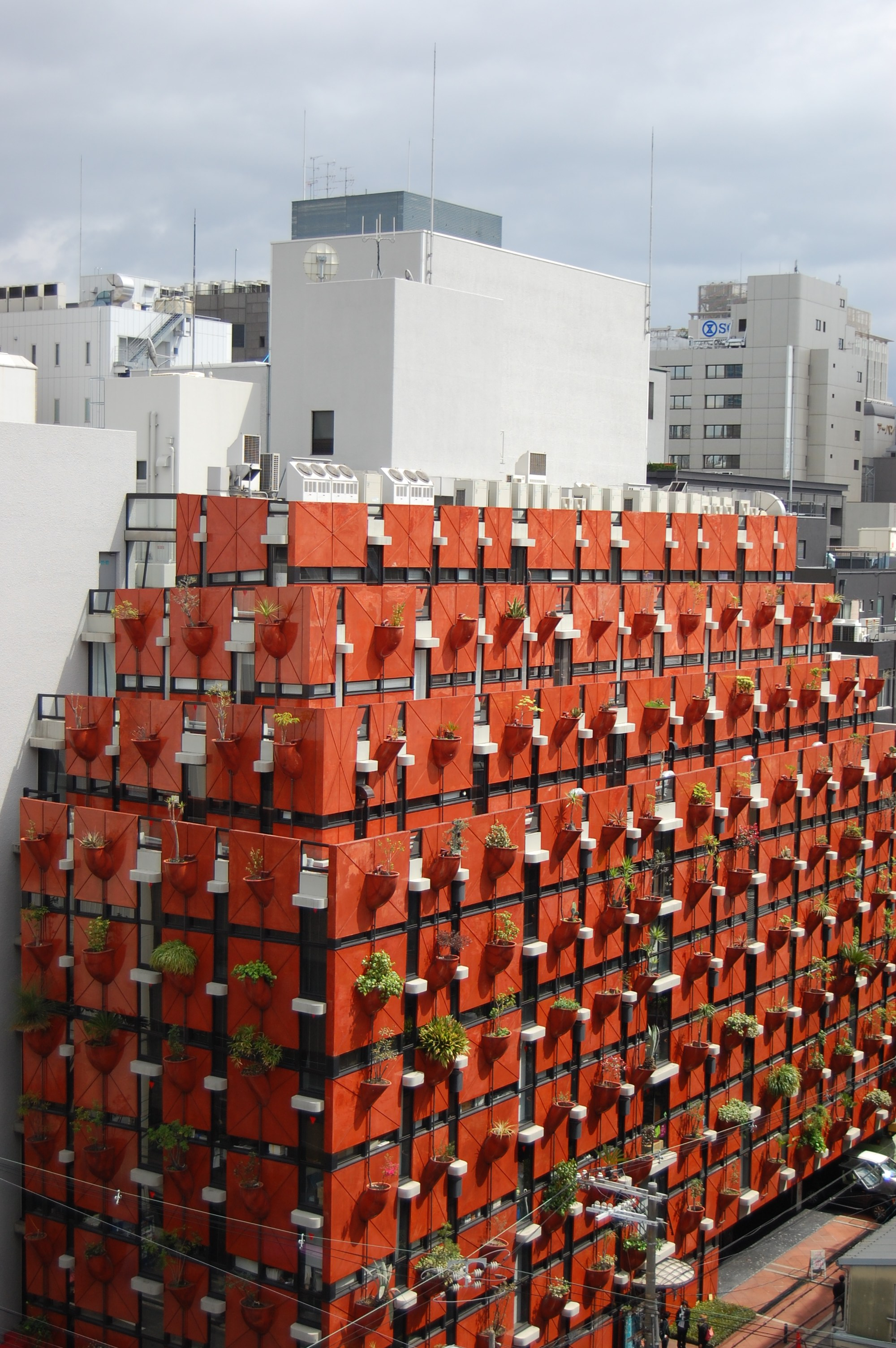
The Organic Building (1993) in Osaka

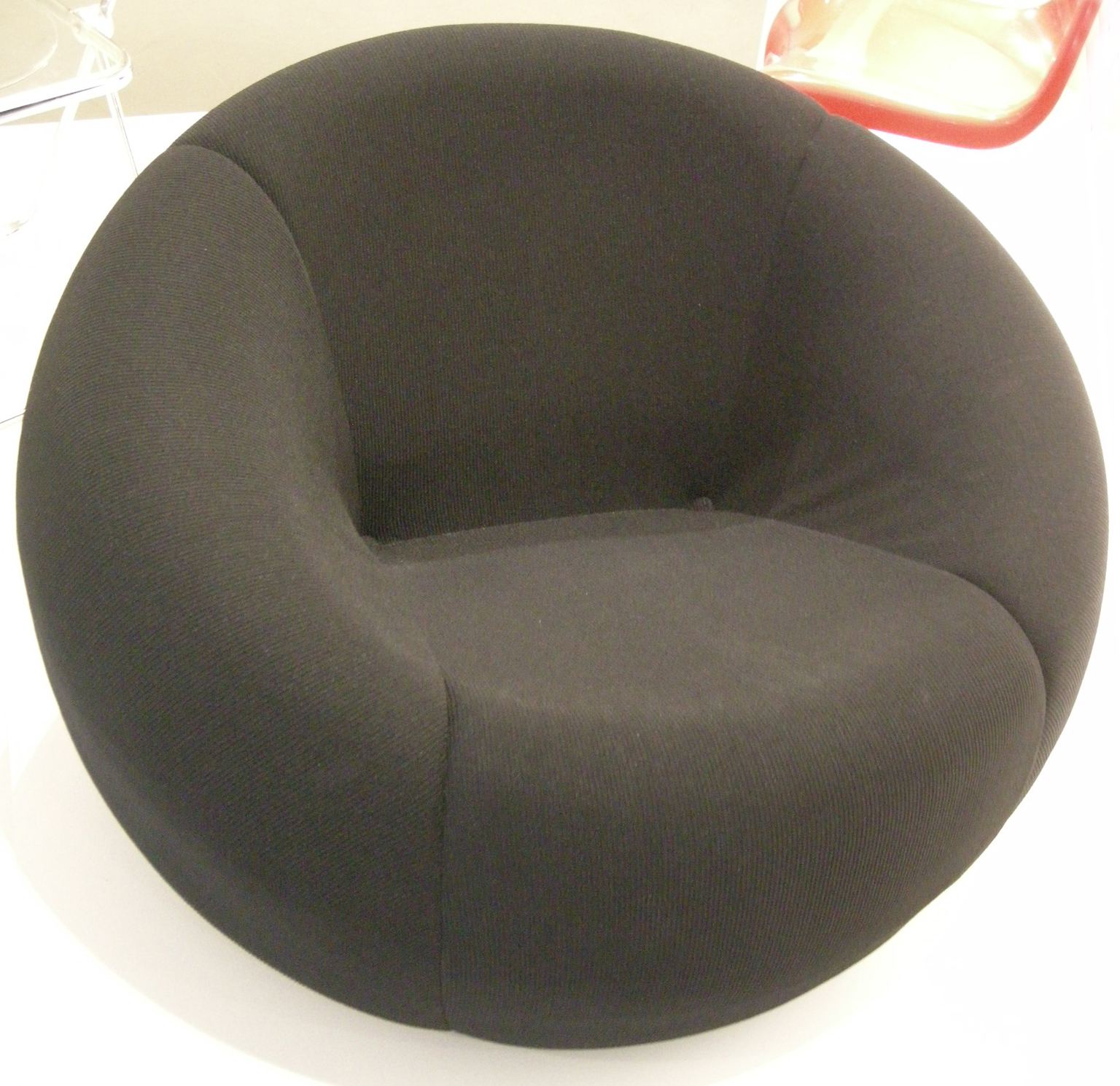
Up chair, designed for C&B Italia (1969)

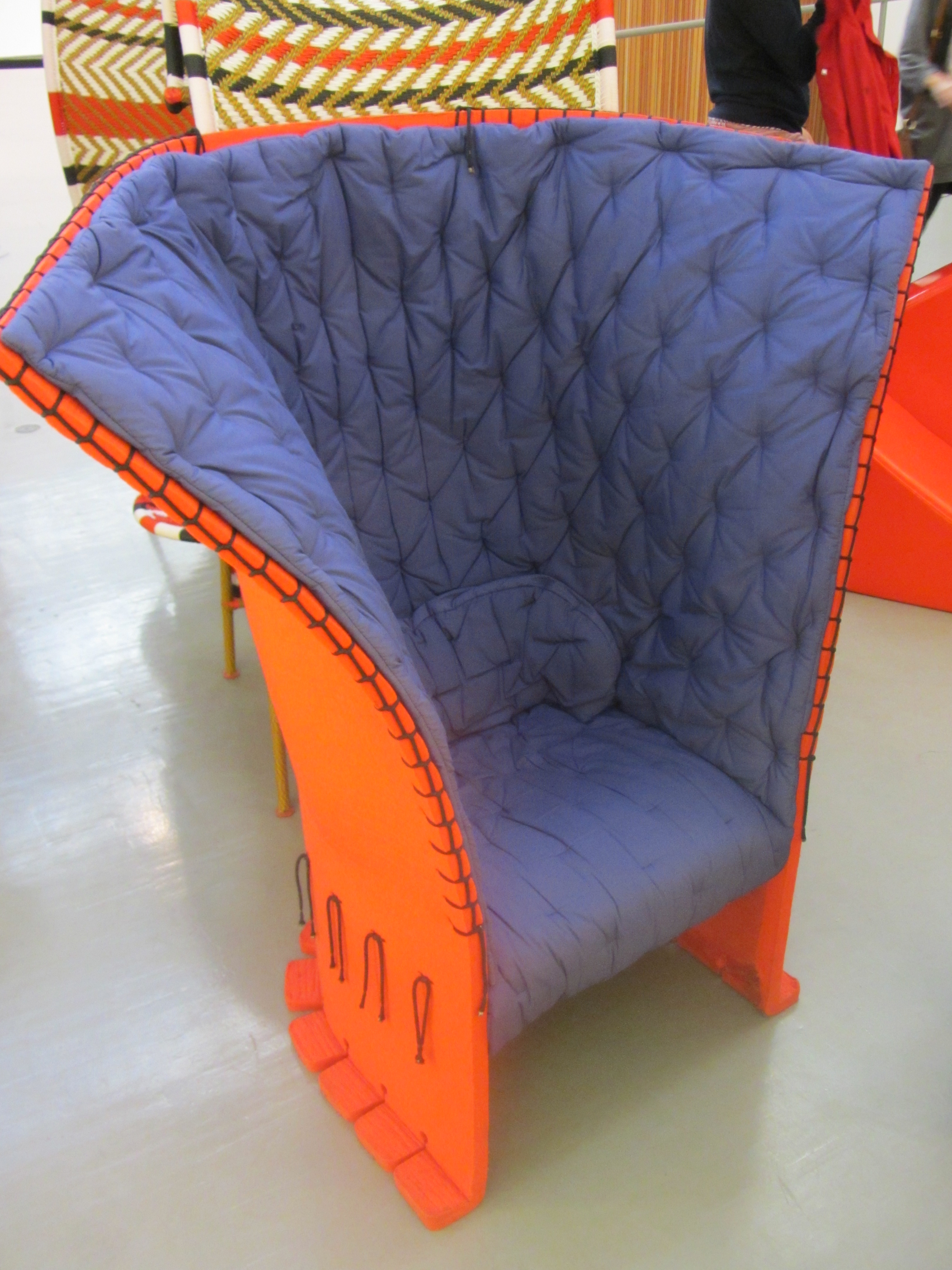
I Feltri, designed for Cassina (1987)

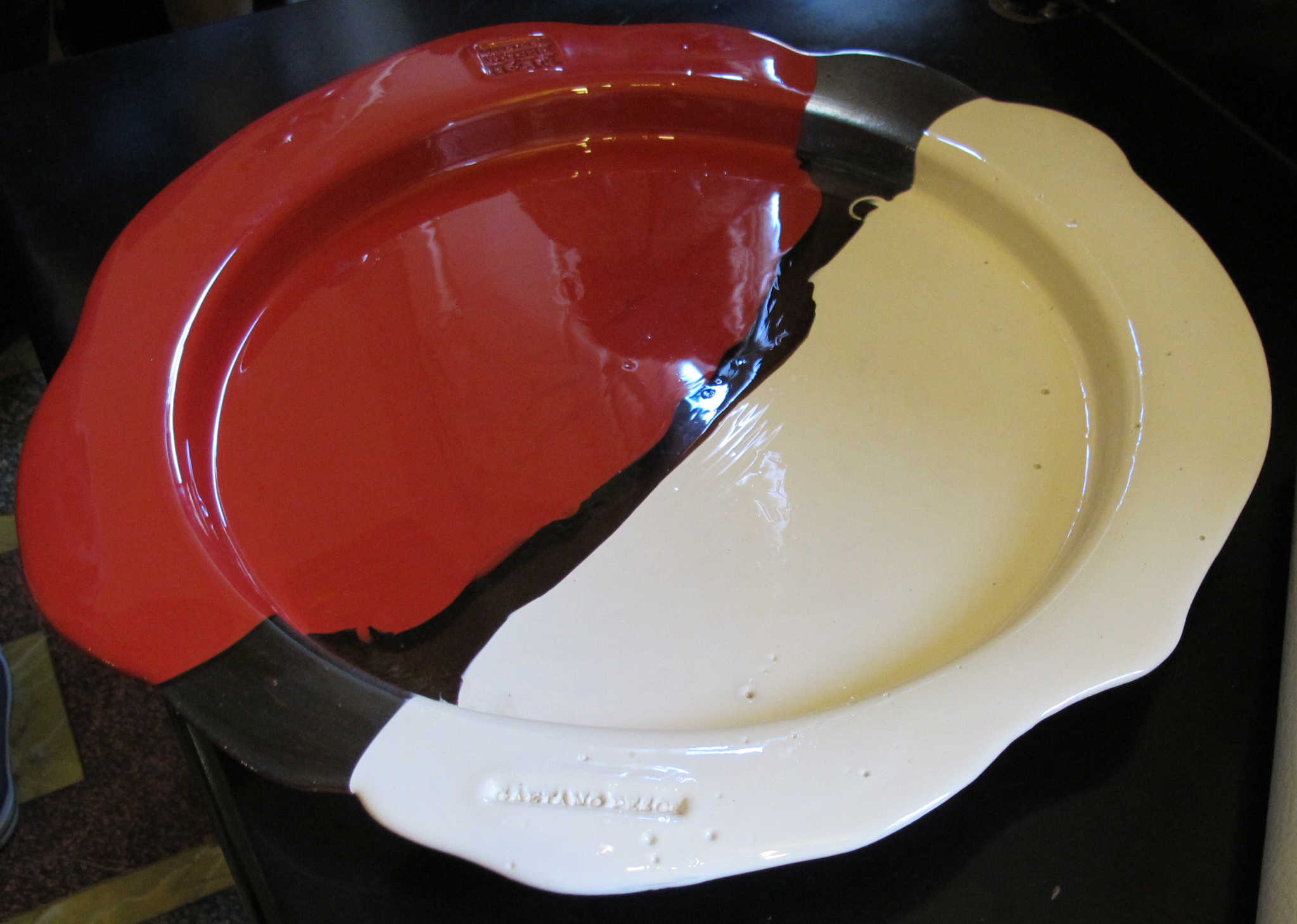
Platter in resin

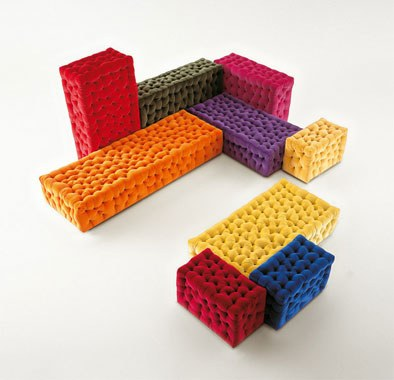
La Michetta modular sofa seating components inspired by Michetta bread (2005)

Gaetano Pesce (8 November 1939 – 3 April 2024) was an Italian architect and a design pioneer of the 20th century. Pesce was born in La Spezia in 1939, and he grew up in Padua and Florence. During his 50-year career, Pesce worked as an architect, urban planner, and industrial designer. His outlook is considered broad and humanistic, and his work is characterized by an inventive use of color and materials, asserting connections between the individual and society, through art, architecture, and design to reappraise mid-twentieth-century modern life.

== Architecture career ==
Pesce, born on 8 November 1939 in La Spezia, Italy, studied architecture at the University of Venice, with such notable teachers as Carlo Scarpa and Ernesto Rogers. Between 1958 and 1963, Pesce participated in Gruppo N, an early collective concerned with programmed art patterned after the Bauhaus. Since the 1960s, Gaetano Pesce has been known to relate art to the design of interiors, products, and architecture. The New York Times critic Herbert Muschamp described Pesce as "the architectural equivalent of a brainstorm." Pesce's well known work includes Organic Building in Osaka, Japan, a Landmark vertical garden building designed to concealing a complex, computer-controlled hydration system to sustain plant growth, and the interior architecture of the Chiat/Day offices, an early workplace village modeled after urban life. Among Pesce's architecture achievements are Les Halles ACIH (1979) and Parc de la Villette (1985), Paris, France, a complex of forms shaped like a running child.

Pesce's prototypical three-dimensional models and architectural drawings are held in the permanent museum collections of MoMA, Metropolitan Museum of Art, and the Cooper-Hewitt Smithsonian Design Museum in New York City; the Philadelphia Museum of Art, PA; San Francisco Museum of Art, California; Victoria and Albert Museum, London; Vitra Design Museum, Germany; Danish Museum of Art & Design, Copenhagen; Centre Pompidou and Musée des Arts Décoratifs, Paris, France, and the Triennale Museum, Milan, Italy.

=== Architecture projects ===
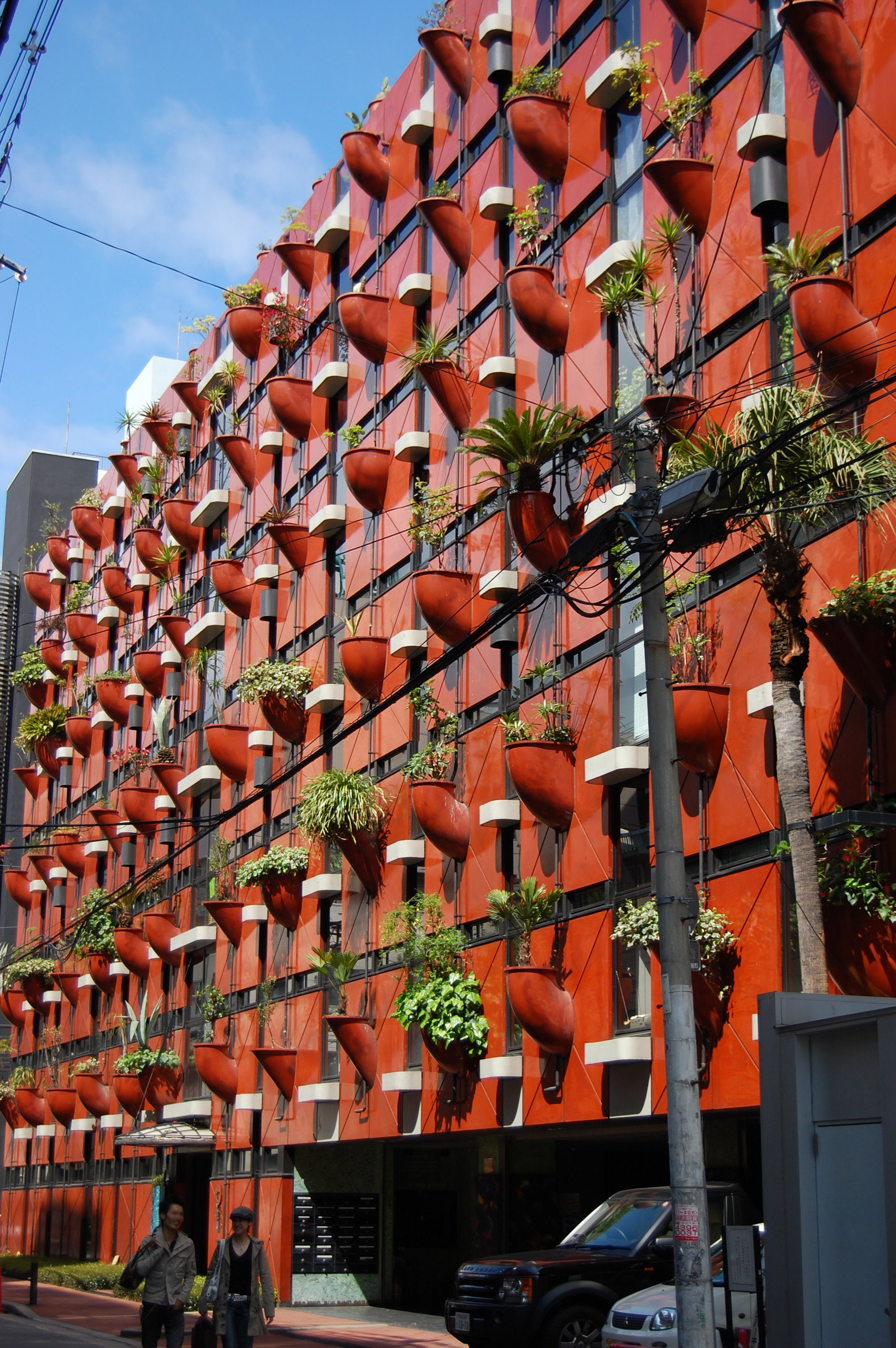
Organic building, Osaka (façade)

- 1980: Late Entries to the Chicago Tribune Tower Competition II.
- 1983: Project for rehabilitation of the Lingotto, Turin, Italy, for the Fiat group
- 1984: la Maison des enfants au Parc de la Villette, Paris, France
- 1986: Hubin Apartment, Paris
- 1991: TBWA\Chiat\Day Offices, New York
- 1993: Organic Building, Osaka, Japan
- 1994: Shuman Residence, New York
- 1994: Art Gallery. Knokke-le-Zoute, Belgium
- 1994: Bahia House, Brazil

== Industrial design ==
From the 1960s on, Pesce researched the function and form of utilitarian and decorative objects, including furniture, jewellery, and shoes, from the perspective of human emotion, environment, and production. Pesce is known for innovative, high-minded modern design with wit and style. Pesce challenged accepted standards of abstraction, uniformity, and homogeneity. On the architect-designer, critic Susan Slesin wrote, "For Gaetano Pesce, to be modern is to face the world squarely and use design as a means to comment on it. Pesce expanded the established notions of Modernism through the creation functional, imperfect, and warm product design. He connected art and society to design through organic form, for production by B&B Italia (formerly C & B Italia), Vitra, Cassina, and fabric design, such as People (1987), composed of 570 different figures, all of which incorporate ideas about variation and diversity in contemporary society.

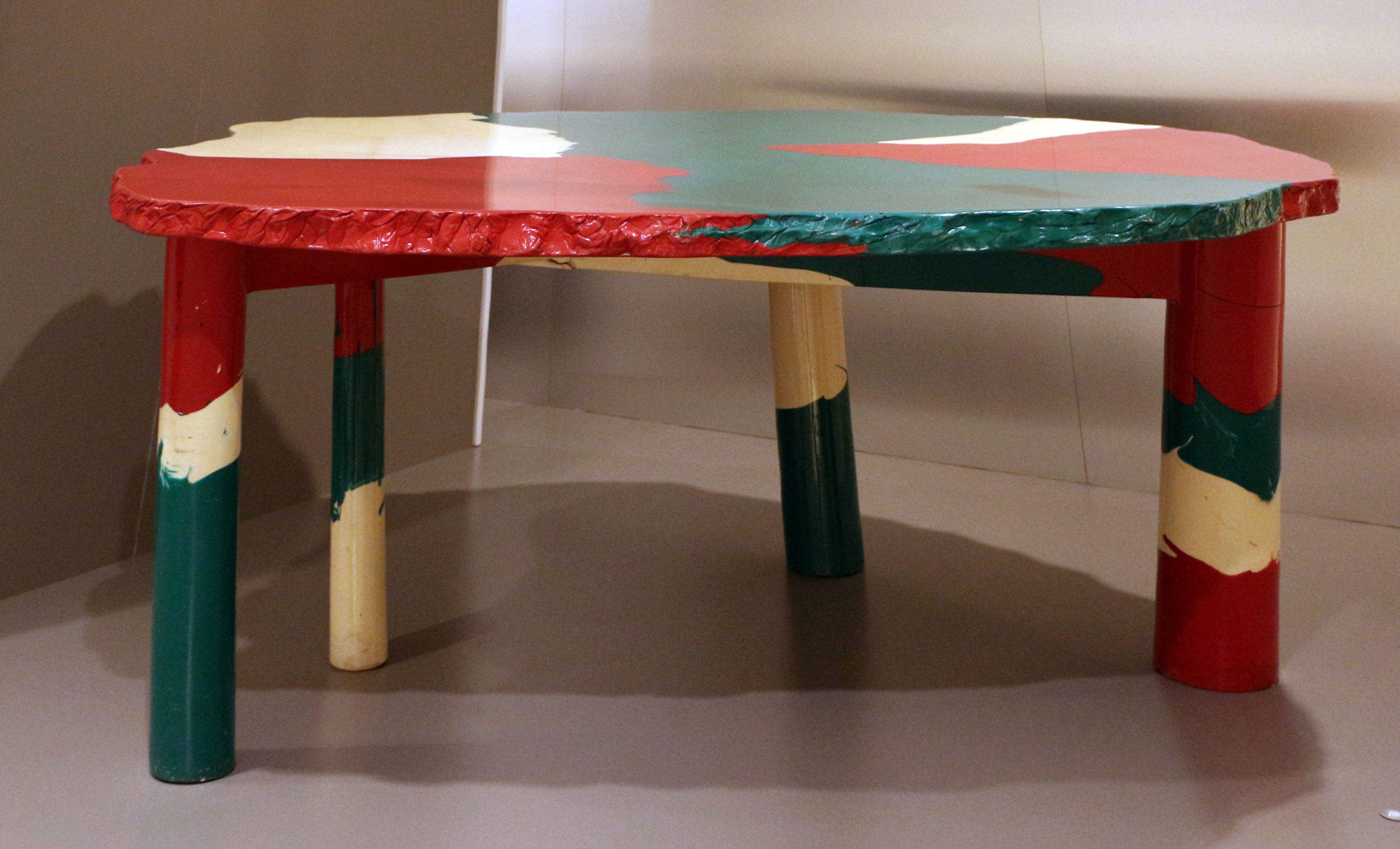
Sansone I table for Cassina (1980)

Pesce's iconic feminist armchair - a fulsome bulbous form and attached ball-shaped ottoman – alternately referred to as La Mamma, Big Mama, Donna, and Up chair – continues to inspire interpretation nearly 50 years after its creation. According to curator and author of SuperDesign, Maria Cristina Didero, "Pesce wanted to produce something about the condition of women in the world. The chair can be read as the mother, and the stool her child. But it could also be a ball and chain [suggesting] woman and the prison she was obliged to live in."

Pesce is perhaps best known for his work with resin, moulds, and casting techniques used to create objects, including vases, chairs, lamps and the two-dimensional reliefs that the designer called “industrial skins.” From 1987 onwards, he infused ordinary materials with experimental additives, such as liquid plant resin, and worked with foam and urethane, simplify the manufacturing processes and adapt limited industrial capabilities. Pesce credited the early influence of his student work with three venerable Murano glassmakers — Moretti, Vistosi, and Venini — whose casting techniques for informing his label-defying works of sculpture, furniture, vessels, and paintings. Even Pesce's own experimentation in glassmaking led to inventive techniques and highly original results. Pesce even used urethane resin to create necklaces, bracelets, brooches, and rings.

For Pesce, the design and development of portable goods always incorporated craft-specialization, history, humour, and the human need for connection. Pesce's industrial design techniques, such as diversified series production is a process by which he experimented with materials using a craft manufacturing sensibility applied to mass production methodology. On the production line, for example, factory workers vary proportions to produce a series of objects with an "imperfect and warm" quality.

Socio-political messaging is found in Pesce's collections, such as "Nobody’s Perfect" (2002) by Zerodisegno, and the 2010 series of irregularly shaped tables for Cassina, which together form the recognizable shape of a boot shape, commemorating the 150th anniversary of the unification of Italy, and celebrate human diversity and connection, as well as one-of-a-kind pieces like “America Table” (2012), with a red-white-and-blue resin tabletop American flag supported on letters that spell “independence,” and “Verbal Abuse” (1994), a tall, grided lamp that bends forward with attachable weights.

Pesce's unconventional mixed-media industrial design and organic forms collected in major museums across the world ascribe the work to the realm of art. A 2014 retrospective exhibition The Time of Diversity at the MAXXI, National Museum of the 21st Century Arts, Rome, charted the artfulness of Pesce's product design from the 1960s to the present. Recent exhibitions such as “What it is to be Human,” at The Peninsula Chicago, Art Basel in Hong Kong, and an artist-in-resident program at Peninsula Beijing, all featuring works by Pesce that expand the renown artist and architect's history of public commitment to the arts. In 2016, Pesce unveiled a site-specific sculpture "Majesty Betrayed" on the Piazza Santa Maria Novella. The monumental female figure wrapped in a long cloak by Pesce was inspired by the Christian Maestà iconography of the Madonna on the Throne – the highly venerated Madonna Rucellai by Duccio di Boninsegna (1285), in Santa Maria Novella and later moved in the twentieth century to the Uffizi. Pesce's sculpture entitled "Porta Ritratti" (2018) for the Milan Fuorisalone was exhibited at the entrance of the Brera Academy of Fine Arts, and later, the 13th edition of Design Miami / Basel. The ambitious installation – a chair measuring over 13 feet (4 meters) high representing 20 human faces – according to Pesce, " is a Trojan horse that penetrates the Rocca dell'Arte making victims among the old mentality." The work is another compelling tribute to cultural diversity within society.

== Gallery and museum exhibitions ==
Pesce's architecture and design have been published, exhibited, and collected internationally and included in the permanent collections of museums around the world.

=== Solo exhibitions ===
- 1975: Gaetano Pesce, Le futur est peut-être passé ("Gaetano Pesce, The future is perhaps past"): Centre de Création Industrielle, Établissement Public du Centre Beaubourg, Musée des Arts Décoratifs, Paris
- 1983: Gaetano Pesce : a Yale School of Architecture Exhibition.
- 1986: Gaetano Pesce 1975–1985. Strasbourg Museum of Modern and Contemporary Art, France.
- 1988: Gaetano Pesce: Drawings, Models, Prototypes. Max Protetch Gallery, New York
- 1988: Modern Times Again. Steelcase Design Partnership, New York, New York
- 1989: Gaetano Pesce: Steelcase design partnership. Max Protetch Gallery, New York
- 1989: Gaetano Pesce : produire industriellement la différence. UQAM, Centre de design, Montréal, Canada
- 1991: Gaetano Pesce. Collaborative Exhibition. Tel Aviv Museum of Art, Israel; Peter Joseph Gallery, New York
- 1996: Gaetano Pesce Le temps des questions, retrospective. Forum of the Centre Pompidou, Paris, France.
- 1997: Gaetano Pesce, Material Connection, New York, N.Y.
- 1997: Currents 69: GAETANO PESCE. Saint Louis Art Museum, Saint Louis, MO.
- 1997: Gaetano Pesce. The Gallery Mourmans, Zoute
- 1998: The presence of objets—Gaetano Pesce. Montreal Museum of Decorative Arts
- 1999: Gaetano Pesce: The Presence of the Objects. Columbia GSAPP, Temple Hoyne Buell Center for the Study of American Architecture.
- 2002: Musée des Arts Décoratifs, Paris, France.
- 2005: Gaetano Pesce: Pushing the Limits. Philadelphia Museum of Art, Philadelphia, PA.
- 2005: Gaetano Pesce: Il rumore del tempo. Triennale di Milano, Milan, Italy.
- 2005: H2O. Gaetano Pesce. Institut Valencià d'Art Modern (IVAM)
- 2007: Pink Pavilion di Gaetano Pesce, Triennale di Milano, Milan, Italy
- 2010: Gaetano Pesce: Pieces from a Larger Puzzle. Italian Cultural Institute of Los Angeles, California.
- 2011: L’Italia in Croce di Gaetano Pesce. Venice BiennaleItalian Pavilion, Italian Cultural Institute of New York.
- 2013: Gaetano Pesce: L'Abbraccio. Fred Torres Collaborations, New York
- 2013: Gaetano Pesce Retrospective. Collective.1 Design Fair, Pier 57, New York, N.Y.
- 2014: Gaetano Pesce: Il tempo della diversità. una retrospettiva, MAXXI, National Museum of the 21st Century Arts, Rome.
- 2014:Transforming Reality: Italian Design Innovation and Fantasy. Eagle Gallery, Cafesjian Museum of Art, Armenia
- 2014: Gaetano Pesce: Retrospective. Sotheby's Gallery Charpentier, Paris, France.
- 2015: Frammenti e figure architettoniche ai quattro angoli del mondo. Galleria Antonia Jannone, Milano, Italy.
- 2015: Gaetano Pesce: ‘One of a Kind Iconic Works, 1967–2015. Allouche Gallery, New York
- 2015: Gaetano Pesce: For Her. Reinstein Ross Gallery, 30 Gansevoort Street, NYC
- 2015: Performance nell’installazione : La Cucina Luogo di Passione. Triennale Design Museum, Milan, Italy.
- 2015: Gaetano Pesce: Frammenti e figure architettoniche ai quattro angoli del mondo. Galleria Antonia Jannone, Milan, Italy
- 2016: Fish Design, Maison & Objet, Paris
- 2016: Gaetano Pesce: Molds (Gelati Misti) MOCA Pacific Design Center, Los Angeles
- 2016: Gaetano Pesce 'Gli Armadi Parlanti' ('The Speaking Cabinets') Salon 94, Design Miami
- 2017: Gaetano Pesce : architettura e fugurazione. Complesso Museale di Palazzo Ducale, Mantua, Italy
- 2019: Gaetano Pesce: Workingallery, Salon 94 Design, New York
- 2019: Gaetano Pesce: Age of Contaminations. Friedman Benda, New York
- 2021: Nobody's Perfect: Pesce's First Solo, Sea World Arts and Culture Center, Shenzhen, China
- 2023: Dear Future, Goldwyn House, Los Angeles

=== Group exhibitions and programs ===
- 1972: The New Domestic Landscape: Achievements and Problems of Italian Design. The Museum of Modern Art, 26 May to 11 September 1972.

Architecture on Film: Italy – The New Domestic Landscape, MoMA, 1972 + Q&A with Gaetano Pesce and Peter Lang.

- 1975: The Future Is Perhaps Past. Musée des Arts Décoratifs, Paris, France.
- 1979: Transformations in Modern Architecture. MoMA, New York.
- 1981: Furniture by architects : contemporary chairs, tables and lamps. Hayden Gallery, Massachusetts Institute of Technology, Cambridge, Mass.
- 1986: L'eau en formes (Water forms): Vittel Design 86. Centre Georges Pompidou, Paris, France.
- 1991: Masterworks. Peter Joseph Gallery, New York.
- 1995: Mutant Materials in Contemporary Design. Museum of Modern Art, New York, N.Y.
- 1997: Designed for Delight: Alternative aspects of twentieth-century decorative arts, travel exhibition.

Canadian Museum of History; Cincinnati Art Museum, OH; Montreal Museum of Fine Arts, Canada;
Musee des Arts Decoratifs, Paris, France.

- 1998: International New Glass 1998: Venezia aperto vetro. Fortuny Museum, Doge's Palace,

and Istituto Statale d'Arte di Venezia, Italy.

- 2002: Mod to Memphis : design in colour 1960s–80s. Powerhouse Pub, Sydney
- 2003: Inside Design Now. Triennial of the Cooper-Hewitt National Design Museum, New York, New York.
- 2003: US Design: 1975–2000, travel exhibition. Denver Art Museum, Denver, Colorado; Memphis Brooks Museum of Art, Memphis, Tennessee. Bass Museum of Art, Miami;

Museum of Art & Design, (formerly American Craft Museum), New York, N.Y.

- 2008: Formless Furniture. Museum of Applied Arts, Vienna
- 2008: Dreamland: Architectural Experiments Since the 1970s. MoMA, New York, N.Y.
- 2012: Design Miami.
- 2013: Pop Art Design. Moderna Museet, Stockholm, Sweden.
- 2016: Tempting Art: Edible gems. Whitechapel Gallery, Musée d'Art Moderne Grand-Duc Jean, Luxembourg
- 2015: New Territories: Laboratories for Design, Craft and Art in Latin America, Museum of Arts and Design
- 2015: Kitchens & Invaders. VIII Triennale Design Museum, Viale Emilio Alemagna. Milan, Italy.
- 2019: Objects of Desire: Surrealism and Design 1924 – Today. Vitra Design Museum, Weil am Rhein, Germany.
- 2019: Performa 19. New York.
- 2021: “No more silent object”. Salon94 Gallery, New York.

== Academic experience ==
For 28 years, Pesce taught architectural design at the Institut National des Sciences Appliquées (INSA) (National Institute of Applied Sciences), Strasbourg, France; Domus Academy, Milan, Italy; City University of Hong Kong, China; Escola da Cidade, (AEAUSP), (Architectural School of São Paulo), Brazil; Carnegie Mellon, Pittsburgh, Pennsylvania; Ohio State University, Columbus, Ohio; and in New York, from 1980 on, at the Cooper Union.

== Death ==
Gaetano Pesce died on 3 April 2024, at the age of 84.

== Professional recognition ==
- 1975: Special Prize: Genesi? Fourth International Lighting Design Competition
- 1993: Chrysler Design Award for Innovation and Design.
- 1995: Interior Design Magazine Award for Umbrella chair.
- 2004: Good Design Award. The Chicago Athenaeum Museum of Architecture And Design
- 2005: Collab's Design Excellence Award. Philadelphia Museum of Art
- 2006: Designer of the Year. A&W Architektur und Wohnens, Cologne, Germany
- 2009: Lawrence J. Israel Prize. Interior Design Department of the Fashion Institute of Technology, New York, N.Y.
- 2010: IIC Lifetime Achievement Award. Italian Cultural Institute of Los Angeles

== Literature ==
- Gaetano Pesce: A Yale School of Architecture Exhibition, October 31 – December 2, 1983, New Haven: Yale School of Architecture, 1983. (OCLC 14070024)
- Gaetano Pesce: Multi-Disciplinary Work, Tel Aviv; New York: Tel Aviv Museum of Art and Peter Joseph Gallery, 1991. (OCLC 1075309233)
- Gaetano Pesce: Cinq Techniques Pour La Verre, Marseille: Musee de Marseille, 1992. (OCLC 848614376)
- Gaetano Pesce: Le Temps des Questions, Paris: Centre G. Pompidou, 1996. (OCLC 1153523314)
- Marisa Bartolucci, ed. Marisa Bartolucci and Raul Cabra, Gaetano Pesce: Compact Design Portfolio, San Francisco: Chronicle Books, 2003. (ISBN 9780811837880)
- Il Rumore del Tempo: Gaetano Pesce, Milan: Carta; Triennale di Milano, 2004–2005. (ISBN 9788881585199)
- Gaetano Pesce, ed. Maria Luisa Caffarelli, Gaetano Pesce "Nobody's perfect": plastica e design, Alessandria, Italy: Citta di Alessandria, 2005. (OCLC 62393569)
- Gaetano Pesce and Silvana Annicchiarico, Gaetano Pesce: Pink Pavillion, Milan: Electa; Triennale di Milan, 2008. (OCLC 232963483)
- Gaetano Pesce: Pieces from a Larger Puzzle, 2010
- Gaetano Pesce: Six Tables on Water, David Gill Gallery, 2012.
- Domitilla Dardi, ed. Gianni Mercurio and Domitilla Dardi, Gaetano Pesce: Il Tempo Della Diversità: catalogo della mostra, Milan: Electa, 2014. (ISBN 9788837099879)
- Carlo Martino, Gaetano Pesce: Materia e differnza, Marsilio, 2007. (ISBN 9788883820793)
- Ed. Laura Bannister, Out in the world with Gaetano Pesce, New York, 2021. (ISBN 9781736661208)
