= Afra and Tobia Scarpa =

Italian architects

Afra Scarpa
- Born: Afra Bianchin; March 28, 1937; Montebelluna, Italy
- Died: July 2011 (aged 74); Trevignano (Treviso), Italy
- Occupation: Designer

Tobia Scarpa
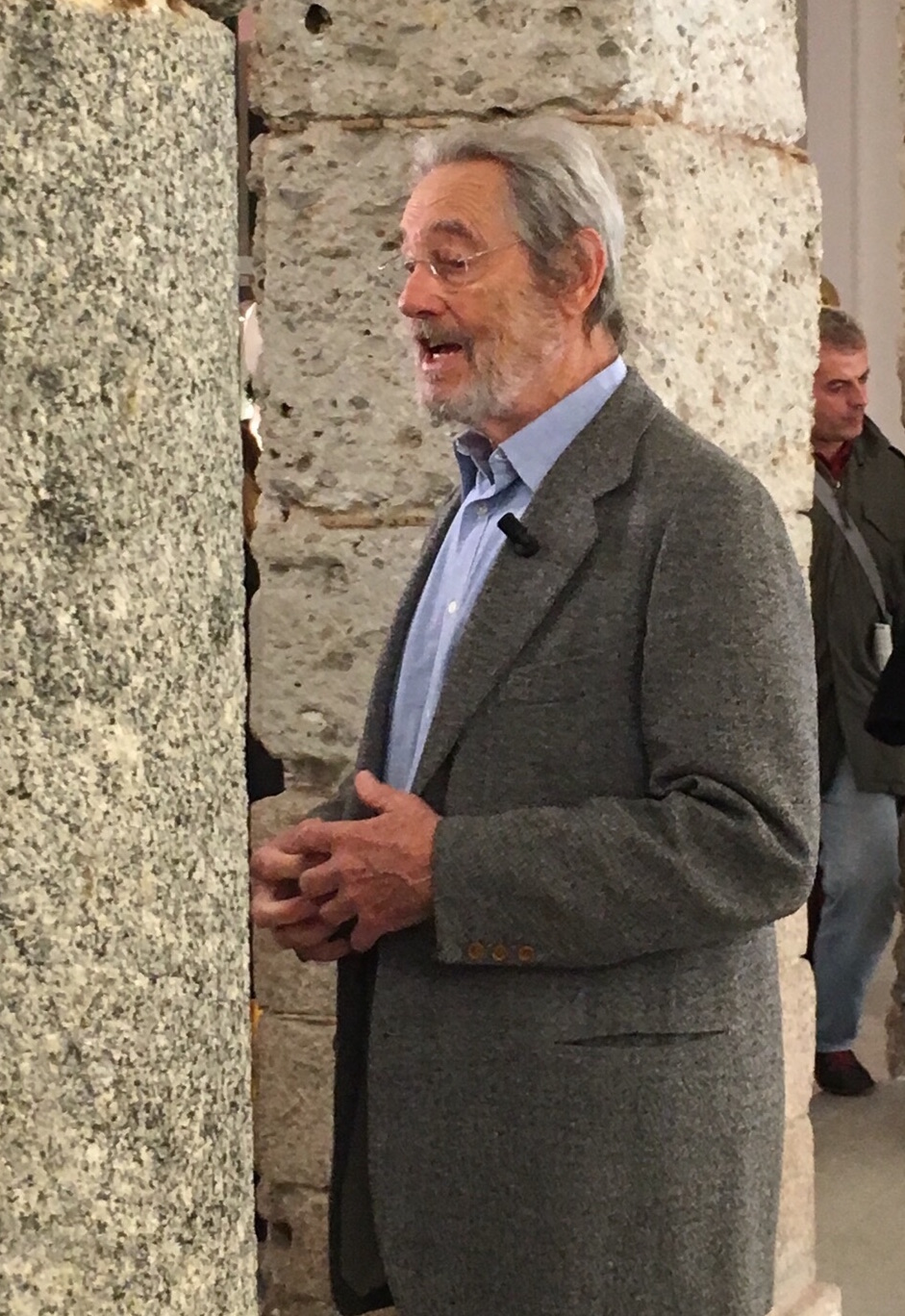
- Scarpa in 2015
- Born: January 1, 1935 (age 91); Venice, Italy
- Occupation: Designer
- Father: Carlo Scarpa

Afra and Tobia Scarpa are award-winning postmodern Italian architects and designers. Their pieces can be found in museums across the United States and Europe, including collections in MoMA and the Louvre Museum. They have collaborated with companies such as B&B Italia, San Lorenzo Silver, and Knoll International. They have won a number of awards such as the Compasso d'Oro in 1969 to the International Forum Design in 1992. Their design work consists of architecture and everyday household items including, furniture, clothing, interior design, art glass. They focused on the technical and aesthetic possibilities of materials in their designs. The couple was greatly influenced by Tobia’s father, Carlo Scarpa, a Venetian architect and designer.

== Life and work ==
Afra Bianchin was born in Montebelluna, Italy in 1937 and Tobia Scarpa was born in Venice, Italy in 1935. Both Afra and Tobia Scarpa earned degrees in architecture from the Università Iuav di Venezia in 1957.

From 1957 to 1961, Tobia worked as a glass designer at the Murano glassworks of Venini, and then in 1960 the two artists opened their own design office in Montebelluna. They designed for Gavina (sofa "Bastiano" 1961), and then followed with a series of projects with several other companies. Their more notable works were made for B&B Italia (sofa "Coronado" 1966), Cassina (armchair "Soriana" 1968), and Meritalia (chair "Libert" 1989).

In 1964, they collaborated with Benetton clothing company to design the firm's first textile factory. Afra and Tobia Scarpa have been responsible for the interiors of the company’s Paris, Freiburg, and New York City offices.

In 1973 they designed the "Papillion" lamp for Flos, one of the first lighting designs to use halogen technology. They also worked for Fabbian (lamps "Saturnina" 1998 and "Galeto" 2001), and Veas (metal lamp "Scandola") in the later part of their careers. From their first collaborations as husband and wife in the mid-1950s until the present day, their pieces have incorporated new technologies, while still maintaining history, form, and function.

Afra and Tobia Scarpa have received the Compasso d'Oro in 1969 to the International Forum Design in 1992. Their furniture has been published in magazine articles like L'ŒIL. From 2004 to 2007, the couple collaborated on many restoration projects for historical buildings such as the Palazzo della Ragione in Verona, Italy.

Since 2002, Tobia has taught in the Design Department of the Università Iuav di Venezia in Venice, Italy. Tobia Scarpa has always believed in design being a profession without a rule book. His timeless creations, including the likes of Fantasma and Foglio, are a true representation of both – his design philosophies and his unmatched mastery over the craft.

== Work with Benetton ==
Their collaboration with Benetton began in 1964, with the design of the firm's first factory. Since then, Afra and Tobia Scarpa have been responsible for all the industrial architecture of the Group. Some of the contributions to Benetton are:

- Project for the Benetton shops in 1966
- Restoration of the Villa Minelli in 1972
- Jeans factory at Cusignana in 1973
- The automated and robotized distribution center at Castrette in 1980
- Benetton offices in Paris and Freiburg in 1980
- The wool division factory at Castrette in 1985
- The Benetton office in New York in 1986
- Rebuilt, with a change in its use, the first factory at Ponzano Veneto in 1987
- Restoration of the Villa Minelli and its surroundings at Ponzano in 1989
- The clothing factory in 1993 (doubled in 1995) in Castrette di Villorba (Treviso)

== Work with Molteni ==
Their collaboration with Molteni began in 1973 with the design of the Monk dining chair. Since then, Afra and Tobia Scarpa have designed a significant number of furniture for the Italian brand throughout two decades. Not all of them are still in production, but everyone is a piece of Italian design history.

Some of the furniture designed for Molteni are:

- Monk chair, 1973
- Morna bed, 1973
- Mop bookcase, 1974
- Mastro chair, 1980
- Meo chair, 1980
- Miss chair, 1986

== Awards ==
- Afra and Tobia Scarpa received the Compasso d'Oro award in 1970
- They received honorary recognition for the same prize in 1979
- They won the Nerocon Merit Award in 1982
- The Primer Premio Nacional de Diseño Otorgado in 1978
- The Auszeichnung für hohe Designqualität in 1992
- The International Forum Design Hanover award in 1992
- Tobia Scarpa won the career Compasso d'Oro award in 2008

== Museums that have Featured the Scarpas’ Work ==
- Museum of Modern Art in New York
- National Museum of Design, New York
- Philadelphia Museum of Art
- Museum of Contemporary Art, Chicago
- La Jolla Museum of Contemporary Art
- Musée du Louvre, Paris
- Staats Museum, Munich
- Österreichisches Museum für Angewandte Kunst Wein, Vienna
- Victoria and Albert Museum, London
- Louisiana Museum of Modern Art, Denmark
- Kunstindustrimuseet, Copenhagen
- Galleri Jerome, Copenhagen
- Galleri Asbaek, Copenhagen
- Museum für Kunst und Gewerbe Hamburg
- Staatliches Museum für Angewandte Kunst, Munich
- Design-Zentrum, Essen
- Museum für Angewandte Kunst (Cologne)
- Cooper Hewitt, Smithsonian Design Museum

== Clients ==
- Gavina (sofa "Bastiano" 1961)
- B & B Italia (sofa "Coronado" 1966)
- Cassina S.p.A. (armchair "Soriana" 1968)
- Meritalia (chair "Libert" 1989)
- Flos (lamps "Papillona 1977 and "Pierrot" 1990)
- Casas (chair "Veronica" 1991)
- Fabbian (lamps "Saturnina" 1998 and "Galeto" 2001)
- Veas (metal lamp "Scandola")
- Cadel
- Dimensione Fuoco
- Molteni
- Poggi
- San Lorenzo
- Knoll International
- Goppion
- IB Office
- Maxalto
- Stildomus
- Unifor
