= Antonio Citterio =

Italian architect and designer

Antonio Citterio (born 1950, in Meda, Italy) is an Italian architect, furniture designer and industrial designer who lives and works in Milan. He designed the A2A Tower in Milan.

== Biography ==
He received a degree in architecture from Politecnico di Milano in 1972, and subsequently started working as a designer and industrial design consultant. From 1987 to 1996, he worked in association with Terry Dwan, designing buildings in Europe and Japan.

In 2000, with Patricia Viel, he founded "Antonio Citterio Patricia Viel" (ACPV), a cross-disciplinary practice for architecture and interior design. The firm works internationally, developing projects on all scales in collaboration with a network of specialist consultants.

Antonio Citterio currently works in the industrial design sector with companies such as Ansorg, Arclinea, Axor-Hansgrohe, B&B Italia, Flexform, Flos, Hermès, Iittala, Kartell, Maxalto, Sanitec (Geberit Group), Technogym and Vitra.

From 2006 to 2016, he was an Architectural Design professor at the Accademia di Architettura di Mendrisio in Switzerland.

In 1987 and 1994, Citterio was awarded the "Compasso d'Oro" prize.

In 2008, the Royal Society for the Encouragement of Arts, Manufactures & Commerce of London awarded him the title of "Honorary Royal Designer for Industry".

== Awards ==
- Continental Winners Prix Versailles (2018)
- Compasso d'Oro (1987, 1994)
