= Rothschild (disambiguation) =

Rothschild is a German surname. It may also refer to:

== People ==
- Rothschild family, a European dynasty of German Jewish origin that established European banking and finance houses from the late eighteenth century
- Rothschild banking family of England, subset of the Rothschild family
- Baron Rothschild, a British peerage
- Baron Rothschild (Austria)
- Jacob Rothschild, 4th Baron Rothschild, a British peer, investment banker, and a member of the Rothschild banking family.

== Banks ==
- Rothschild & Co, known as “Rothschild,” an investment bank / private bank / financial services firm held by the Rothschild banking family and formed from the merger of Paris Orléans and N M Rothschild & Sons
- L.F. Rothschild, a defunct U.S. investment bank, acquired in 1988
- LCF Rothschild Group, the private bank of the Rothschild banking family of France

== Places ==
- Palais Rothschild, palaces in Vienna
- Hôtel Salomon de Rothschild, a palace in Paris
- Rothschild Boulevard, a major street in Tel Aviv
- Rothschild Island
- Walter Rothschild Zoological Museum, Tring
- Rothschild, Wisconsin
- New Court, the historical and present headquarters of Rothschild

=== Vineyards ===
- Château Lafite Rothschild, French vineyard
- Château Mouton Rothschild, French vineyard
- Château Clarke, French vineyard
- Château des Laurets, French vineyard

== Other uses ==
- Rothschild giraffe
- Rothschild Rh, Higurashi no Naku Koro ni Kai ending theme song
- Rothschild (Fabergé egg)
