= OMAS =

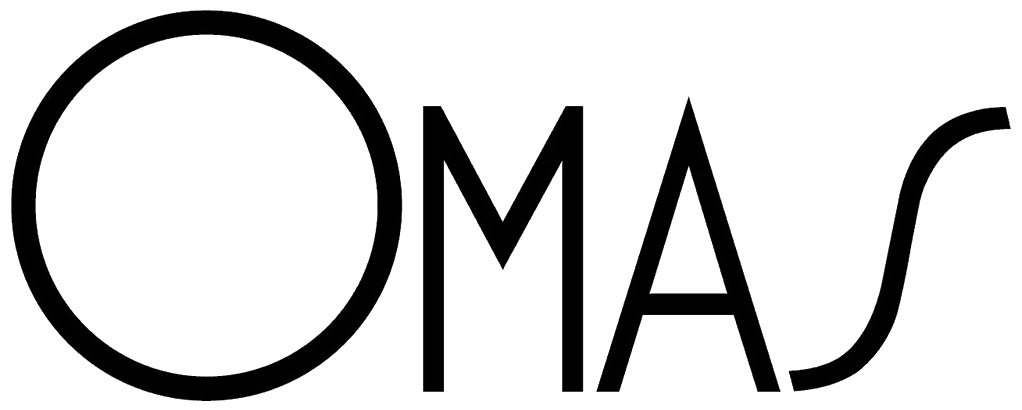
- Type: Private; Brand (2023–)
- Industry: Writing implements
- Founded: 1925
- Founder: Armando Simoni
- Defunct: 2016; 10 years ago
- Fate: Company defunct; brand revived in 2023
- Headquarters: Bologna, Italy
- Products: Fountain pens
- Website: omasofficial.com

OMAS (an acronym for "Officina Meccanica Armando Simoni") is an Italian manufacturing company of writing implements, founded in 1925, put in liquidation in January 2016, and revived in 2023. Their product line has always been manufactured in their factory located in Bologna.

Products manufactured included fountain pens, ink and related luxury goods.

== History ==
The company was founded by Armando Simoni as "Officina Meccanica Armando Simoni" (abbreviated OMAS), setting up in Bologna. Simoni designed the manufacturing equipment and tooling used in the production of the company's fountain pens.

OMAS produced several pen lines, including the faceted "Arte Italiana" collection and various limited editions. Over its operational history, the company introduced several specialized designs, such as the 1920s "doctor's pen" - which featured an integrated clinical thermometer - and the double-nibbed Itala. In the late 1940s, OMAS released the 361 model, featuring a nib that offered variable flexibility depending on its writing position. In 1996, the company launched the 360, a fountain pen featuring a triangular barrel designed to adjust hand position and grip.

The largest size pen manufactured as a non-limited edition in their most current production was the 12-faceted Paragon, the second largest being the Milord. OMAS' product range was last updated in 2005. The Milord model became the size of the pre-2005 Paragon model. OMAS continued to release limited editions based on their earlier style of pens.

In 2000, the French company LVMH acquired OMAS from the heirs of Armando Simoni. It was the only writing instrument company in its suite of companies. In October 2007 the Hengdeli Holdings Limited of Hong Kong purchased 90% equity stake in OMAS. Xinyu had a strategic partnership with LVMH and planned to use OMAS for its expansion of luxury goods in the Asian market. The company continued to be unprofitable, and was sold to another Chinese company, O-Luxe, in 2011.

O-Luxe decided to close OMAS in November 2015 and the company entered voluntary liquidation in January 2016, ceasing all trading. The Turners Workshop Ltd, bought the remaining stock of Acrylics Ebonite and Caseins from the factory closure
