= Arclinea =

Italian furniture manufacturer

- Company type: Privately held company
- Industry: Furnitures
- Founded: Caldogno, Italy, 1925; 101 years ago
- Founder: Silvio Fortuna
- Headquarters: Viale Pasubio, 70 36030 Caldogno (VI) - Italy, Caldogno, Italy
- Area served: Worldwide
- Products: Kitchen furniture and accessories
- Parent: Flos B&B Italia Group
- Website: arclinea.com/en/

Arclinea, also known as Arclinea Arredamenti Spa, is an Italian design company. It was founded in Caldogno, Italy in 1925 by Silvio Fortuna, as a carpentry shop: Silvio resumed the business started by his great-grandfather in 1816 and interrupted a century later by the war. The company change its name from "Ditta Silvio Fortuna, lavorazione meccanica del legno" to "Arclinea Cucine Componibili" in the 1960 and it began to focus exclusively on kitchen cabinetry in 1960. At that point, the firm began crafting cabinetry specifically designed to hold appliances, which had typically been considered a separate kitchen design element. This led to a more sleek, streamlined appearance for the kitchen. Angelo, Almerindo and Lena, Silvio's sons, joined the company too.

In the 70's the third Fortuna generation joined the company with the entry of Silvio, Walter, Marillina and Gianni.

The company successfully introduced several modular kitchen designs into the marketplace during the 1960s and 1970s, working with a variety of European designers as Lucci & Orlandini, Carlo Bartoli, Ettore Sottsass e Associati, Roberto Pamio, Enzo Berti. In 1987, Arclinea partnered with Italian architect Antonio Citterio, that designed and coordinated various kitchen models and remains the sole designer and art director for Arclinea to this day.

Arclinea has been recognized with numerous awards, including Italy's highest design award, the Compasso d'Oro, and the 2004 Elle Decor Designer of the Year Award. Arclinea has also expanded beyond Italy, with locations in Europe, Asia, Australia, and North and South America.

Since 2016 Arclinea is linked to B&B Italia and since December 2018 Arclinea is part of Flos B&B Italia Group.

== See also ==
- List of Italian companies
- B&B Italia
- Flos B&B Italia Group
