= Jean-Marie Massaud =

French architect, inventor and designer (born 1966)

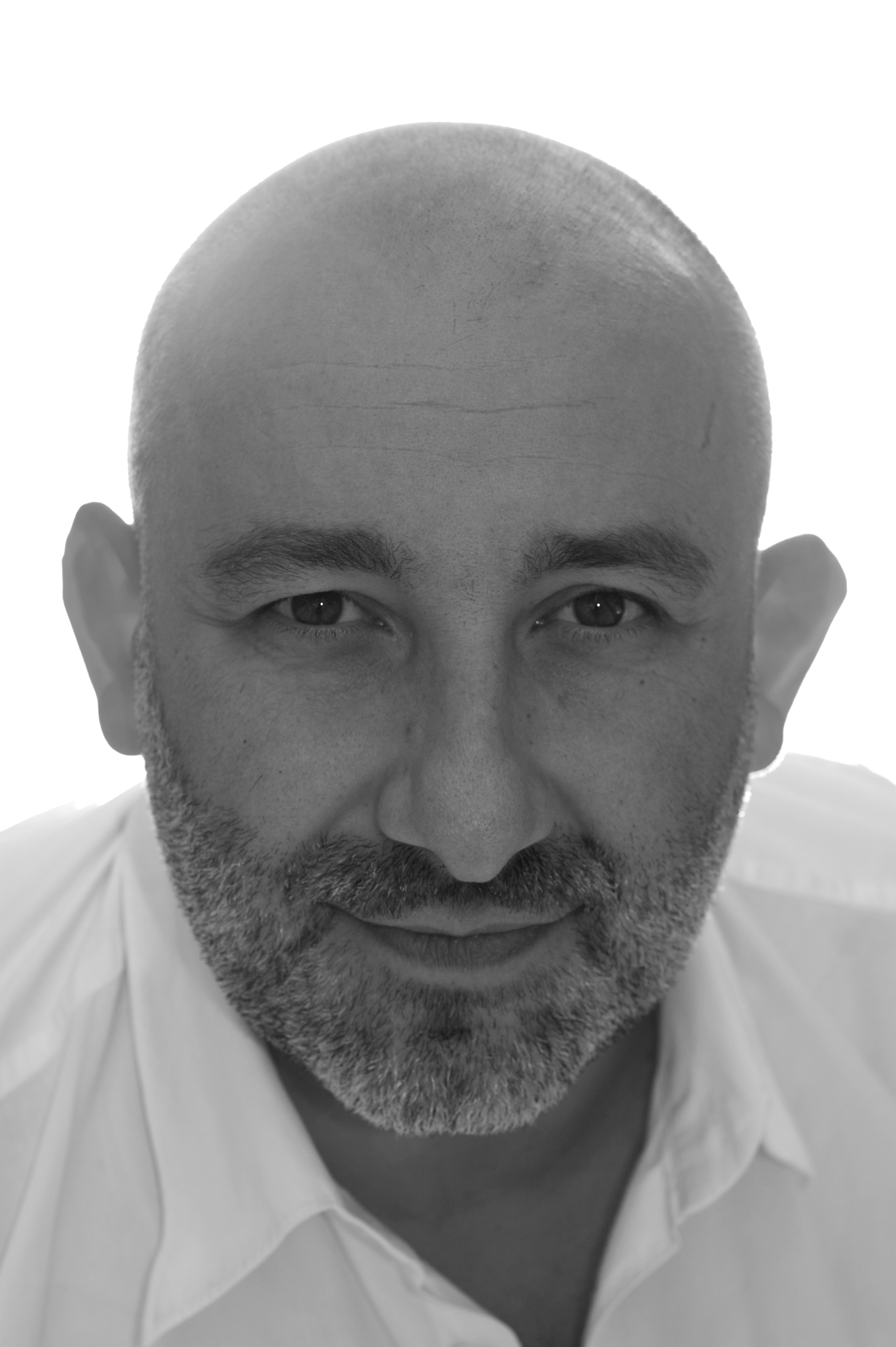
- Born: 8 September 1966 (age 60); Toulouse
- Occupation: Designer
- Website: www.massaud.com

Jean-Marie Massaud (born 8 September 1966 in Toulouse, France) is a French architect, inventor and designer. He was born in Toulouse, France in 1966.

== Biography ==
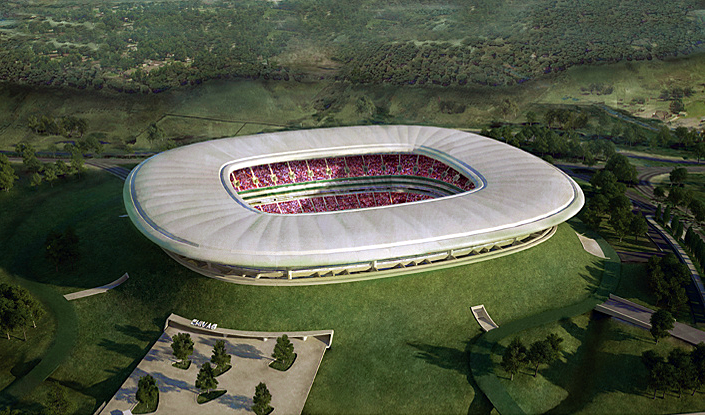
VOLCANO STADIUM (2011)

Jean-Marie Massuad graduated from the École Nationale Supérieure de Création Industrielle – Les Ateliers, Paris (ENSCI) in 1990 and began working with Marc Berthier. In 2000, he co-founded the Studio Massaud with Daniel Pouzet with the aim of expanding his interests in the fields of architecture.

Since the beginning of his career Jean-Marie Massaud has been working on an extensive range of works, stretching from architecture to objects, from one-off project to serial ones, from macro environment down to micro contexts. His work spans architecture and the full spectrum of object design—from bespoke furniture and industrial products, to, to visionary design concepts like a helium-filled airship hotel. Manned Cloud with ONERA as scientific partner or like an innovative concept car, MeWe for Toyota Ed2. Major brands in various different fields (perfumes, tableware, furniture, lighting, ...) such as B&B Italia, Axor Hansgrohe, Christofle, Poliform, Poltrona Frau, Lancôme, Renault, Air France, ...have solicited his ability to mix comfort and elegance, zeitgeist and heritage, generosity and distinction. Jean-Marie Massaud has run a quest for synthesis, reduction and lightness since his first intuitions.

His collaboration with the French designer Marc Berthier and his work in the field of town planning led him towards design and architecture. His contextual approach centres on research into the essential, within which the individual remains the centre of attention. It is a work upheld by research into the senses, magic, and vital emotion which brings him to work with very different brands.

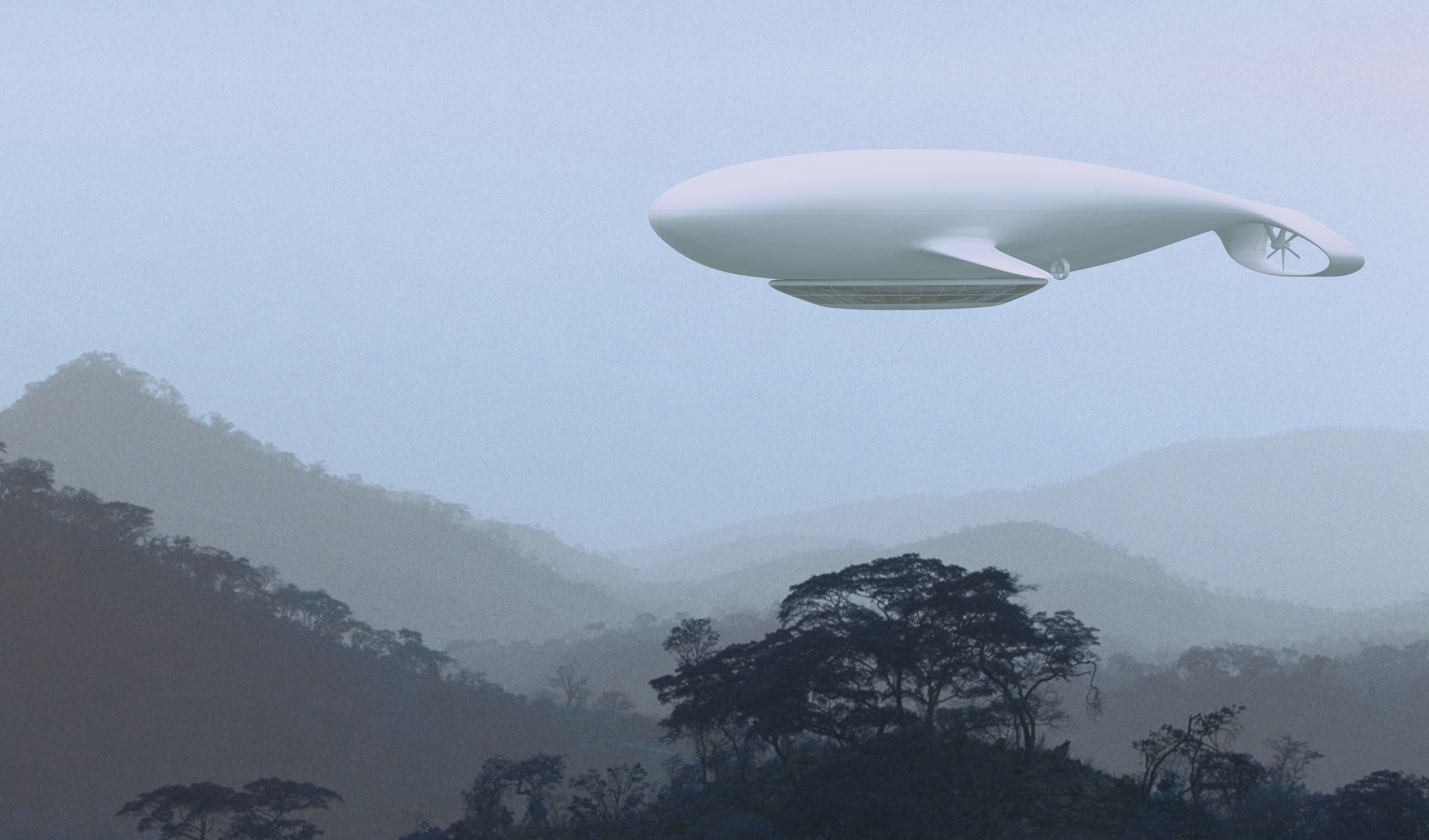
MANNED CLOUD (2008)

Beyond these designs, his quest for lightness – in matters of essence – synthesizes three broader stakes: individual and collective fulfillment, economic and industrial efficiency, and environmental concerns. "I'm trying to find an honest, generous path with the idea that, somewhere between the hard economic data, there are users. People."

His creations, whether speculative or pragmatic, explore this imperative paradigm: reconciling pleasure with responsibility, the individual with the collective. When asked to imagine a new stadium for the city of Guadalajara, Mexico, he comes back with a never seen before cloud and volcano-shaped building, integrated in a vast urban-development program that re-unite leisure and culture, nature and urbanization, sport aficionados and local citizens. Instead of implanting a stadium, he proposed an environment. And the initial vision has proven a realistic approach: the project has come to life in July 2011.

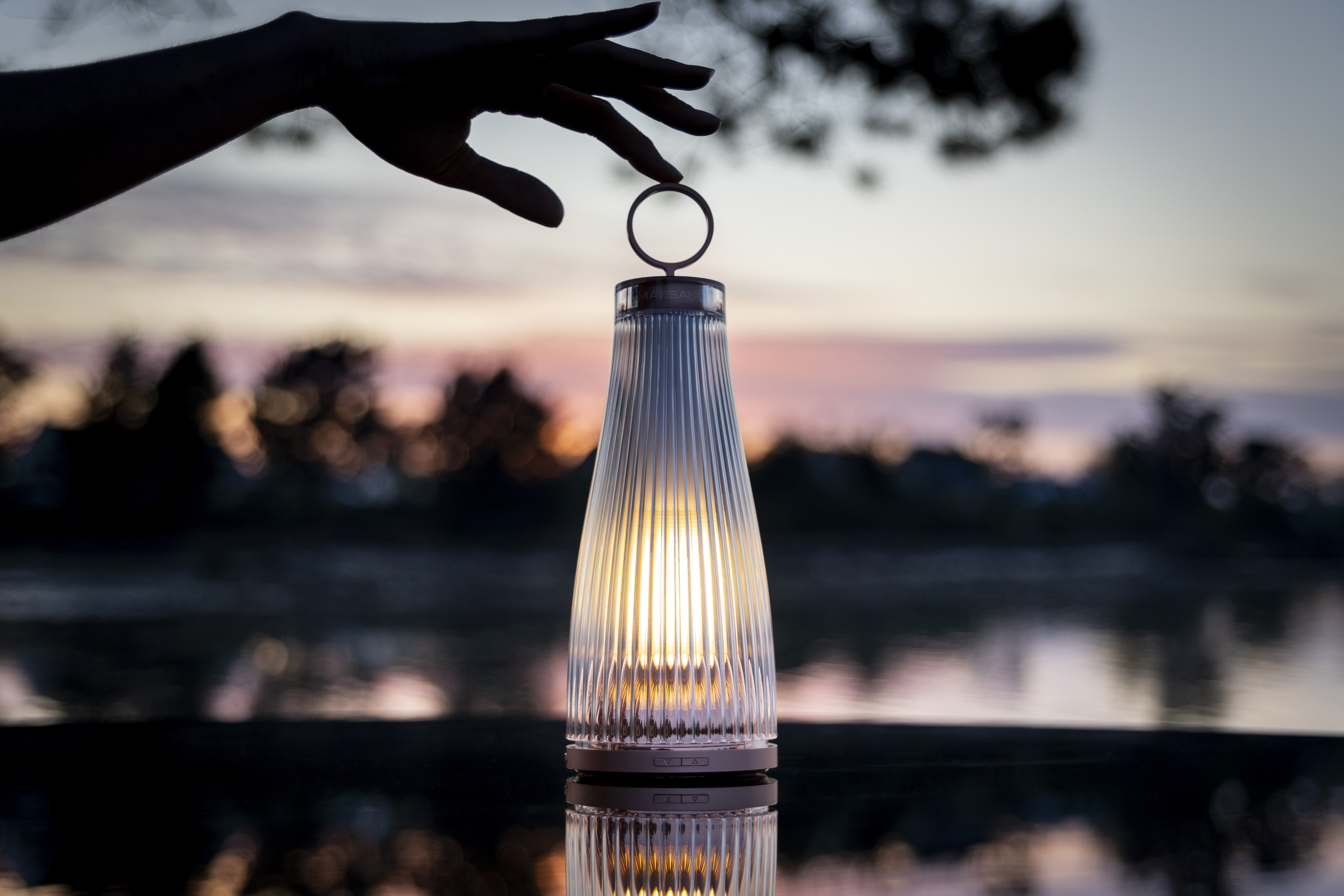
RAMUN LOUISE (2024)

More recently, his concept car developed in partnership with Toyota, has the same objective. MEWE is a synthesis of economical and ecological concepts, integrating issues specific to each stakeholder: the user, industry, and the environment. A pioneering multiple-use platform that is a car for the people, with a body in expanded polypropylene foam: a major innovation. "When I'm working on a project, there’s always an attempt to renew the subject I’m involved in". Another distinctive aspect of his approach.

Far away from trends and fashions, Jean Marie Massaud prefers questioning the existing, working out on progress and eventually proposing timeless and holistic answers to contemporary stakes. It is this symbiosis between Man, his creations and his natural environment, that Jean Marie Massaud strives. to reach, as a catalyst to innovation, as an economic model and as a life project.

Incorporating elements from the natural world, his work combines architectural planning and product design with an emphasis on practical living spaces.

Jean-Marie Massaud has said he draws design inspiration from the thoughtful elegance of Charles & Ray Eames, the eclecticism of Philippe Starck and Castiglioni Brothers, the sharpness of Antonio Citterio, and the expansive creativity of Leonardo da Vinci and Thomas Edison.

Jean-Marie Massaud's approach to design – whether furniture, cars, interior design, architecture or urban planning – begins with the quality of experience and the idea of innovation in terms of environmental sustainability, economic efficiency and collective and individual well-being. The aim of his work is to create organic projects that connect people and nature. Nature, in fact, is the primary source of inspiration for the designer, who pursues solutions that can arouse emotions in their users. The result is an unmistakable signature characterised by simple elements, essential lines and extraordinary lightness.

His works have been awarded several prizes and many of his designs are nowadays on show in the design collections of the major museums worldwide: from Amsterdam, Chicago, London, Paris and Zurich: from the permanent collection of the Musée National d'Art Moderne de Paris to the permanent collections of the Museum für Gestaltung, Zürich, of The Chicago Athenaeum- Museum of Architecture and Design, of The Stedelijk Museum, Amsterdam and of The Musée des arts Décoratifs, Paris.

== Awards and distinctions ==
- 1994–96 3 Top Ten, Italy
- 1995–98 Compasso d'Oro: 3 selections, Italy
- 1995 VIA Carte Blanche, Paris
- 1996 First prize, Maquill'Art, Paris; Grand Prix de la Presse Internationale et de la Critique du Meuble Contemporain 1996; FORM Prize, Germany; Chair of the year (Promosedia dell'Anno) (O’Azard for Magis), Italy
- 1999 Nombre d'Or (Salon du Meuble in Paris), France
- 2000 Arests Best – Best Perfume Bottle (NEMO Cacharel), Norway
- 2001 Etoiles APCI Observeur du Design (Sephora Blanc), France
- 2002 Talents du Luxe, Paris
- 2004 APCI Observer du Design (Ness Collection), France
- 2005 Designer of the Year, ELLE DECO, France; Best Eco Design (Human Nature), DesignTide, Tokyo
- 2006 IF Product – Forum Prize – AXOR-MASSAUD collection
- 2007 Créateur de l’Année of the 2007 Paris Salon du Meuble APCI Observer du Design, France and Good DesignTM Awards, USA (both for Axor-Massaud collection), France - Wallpaper* design awards « best sofa » (Kennedee for PoltronaFrau)
- 2008 APCI Observer du Design (Manned Cloud Hotel), France – Good DesignTM Awards USA (Massaud W08T light for Wastberg & Holy Day Chair for Viccarbe)
- 2009 Créateur de l’année Paris Capitale de la création & Now ! Design à vivre, France, IF Product Design Awards, Germany (Seashell armchair, Slimline chair and Green Wall for Dedon), Good DesignTM Awards, USA (Heaven outdoor collection for Emu), Red Dot Product Design Awards, Germany (Massaud W08T light for Wastberg)
- 2010 Wallpaper* Best domestic design, UK (Archibald chair for PoltronaFrau, Airwake for Airsur & Furtiver Persan rug for Gianda Blasco)
- 2011 PREMIO COMPASSO D’ORO, ADI Design Awards, Italy (Yale sofa for MDF Italia) – PREMIO IBEROAMERICANO CIDI A LA OBRA DEPORTIVA DEL AÑO EN ARQUITECTURA, LANDSCAPE E INTERIORISMO, MÉXICO 2011 Consejo Iberoamericano de Diseñadores de Interiores A. C. (Chivas Stadium for Omnilife) - APCI Observer du design, France (Airwake for airsur).
- 2011 Interior Innovation Award, German Design Council Germany (Flow for MDF Italia)
- 2012 Product Design Award Wallpaper* Design Awards, UK (SeaX chair for Dedon) - Product Design - Best Of the Best Red Dot Design Award, Germany (Blow radiator for Cordivari) - Grand Prix de la Salle de Bain d'Hôtel, Idéobain, France
- 2014 Best Room Mates Wallpaper* Design Awards, UK (GranTorino sofa for PoltronaFrau) - Honorary Award: LI EDELKOORT (Furniture & Interior Design), Design S, Sweden (Airberg sofa for Offecct) - MIAW Best Sofa Muuuz International Award, France (Airberg sofa for Offecct) - EDIDA – TableWare Elle Déco International Design Award, France (Silver Time for Christofle)
- 2015 Red Dot Award for the Massaud Work Lounge With Ottoman, manufactured by Coalesse - Interior Design'sAward Best of Year "best in the 10" bath category Interior Design Magazine NY-US (Axor-Massaud Collection) - Interior Innovation Award 'best of the best' German Design Council, Germany (Rock Tables for MDF Italia) - Honourable Mention Product Design Red Dot Design Award, Germany (Airberg sofa for Offecct)
- 2016 Interior Design's Best of the Year (BoY) - product : Seating-residential/sofa (tie) Interior Design Magazine NY-US (SYDNEY sofa for Poliform) - Product Design Red Dot Design Award, Germany (Scarlett sofa for PoltronaFrau) - Category Furniture: Seating – Contract The Architizer A+ Award Jury, USA (STEEVE sofa for Arper) - GREEN GOOD DESIGN™ Award, The Chicago Athenaeum Museum, USA (Green Islands & O2Asis Collection for Offecct) - Best home office Wallpaper* Design Awards, UK (Seattle for Poliform) - ICONIC Award "Winner" - Interior Innovation Award, German Design Council, Germany (Tigmi outdoor sofa for Dedon) - Etoile de l'Observeur du Design A.P.C.I. Observeur du design, France (Services La Première & Business à bord Air France)
- 2017 Wallpaper* Design Award Winner "Best of Best", Wallpaper* Design Awards UK (Lloyd bookcase for Poltrona Frau) - ICONIC AWARD Interior Innovation "Best of Best" IMM Cologne & German Design Council, Germany (AIKU chair for MDF Italia) - ICONIC Award "Selection" - Interior Innovation Award by German Design Council, Germany (DEAN chair for Dedon)
- 2018 Wallpaper* Design Award Winner "best uchi" Wallpaper* Design Awards, UK (Home Hotel Bench for Poliform)
- 2019 Wallpaper*Design award Winner 2019 "best refelective space" Wallpaper* Design Awards, UK (Creek coffee table for Poliform) - Big SEE Wood Award, Big SEE Product Design 2019 Big SEE Wood Award Zavod Big - Slovénia (Kalia Chaise longue for ZANAT) - "BEST OF THE BEST" Red Dot Design Award, Germany (Axor Edge)
- 2021 le FD100 Awards - Edition 2021 - LE FRENCH DESIGN by VIA, France (Le Club for Poliform) - Wallpaper*Design award Winner 2021 "best curves" Wallpaper* Design Awards, UK (Le Club for Poliform)
- 2022 FURNITURE ARCHIPRODUCTS DESIGN AWARDS – ADA ARCHIPRODUCTS, ITALY (Universal Chair for MDF Italia) – FURNITURE ARCHIPRODUCTS DESIGN AWARDS – ADA ARCHIPRODUCTS, Italy (Archibald 110th anniversary for PoltronaFrau) - IDEAT "Best Chair" 2022 IDEAT DESIGN AWARDS 2022, France (Neilchair for MDF Italia)
- 2023 Wallpaper* Design Awards 2023 "Best Silhouettes" Wallpaper* Design Awards, UK (LLOYD TEXT bookcase for PoltronaFrau) - Wallpaper* Design Awards 2023 "Best Silhouettes" Wallpaper* Design Awards, UK (MUSH table for Poliform)
- 2024 Prize Designs for Modern Furniture + Lighting 2024 Award - Final Winner (Louise lamp for RAMUN) - The Chicago Athenaeum Museum of Architecture and Design and Global Design News.
- 2025 IF Design Award - Winner (Louise lamp for RAMUN)
