= Cassina (company) =

Italian manufacturing company

Cassina S.p.A.
- Founded: 1927
- Founder: Cesare and Umberto Cassina
- Headquarters: Italy
- Area served: Worldwide
- Products: Furniture
- Owner: Poltrona Frau Group
- Website: Cassina S.p.A.

Cassina S.p. A. is an Italian manufacturing company specialised in the creation of high-end designer furniture.

== Origins ==
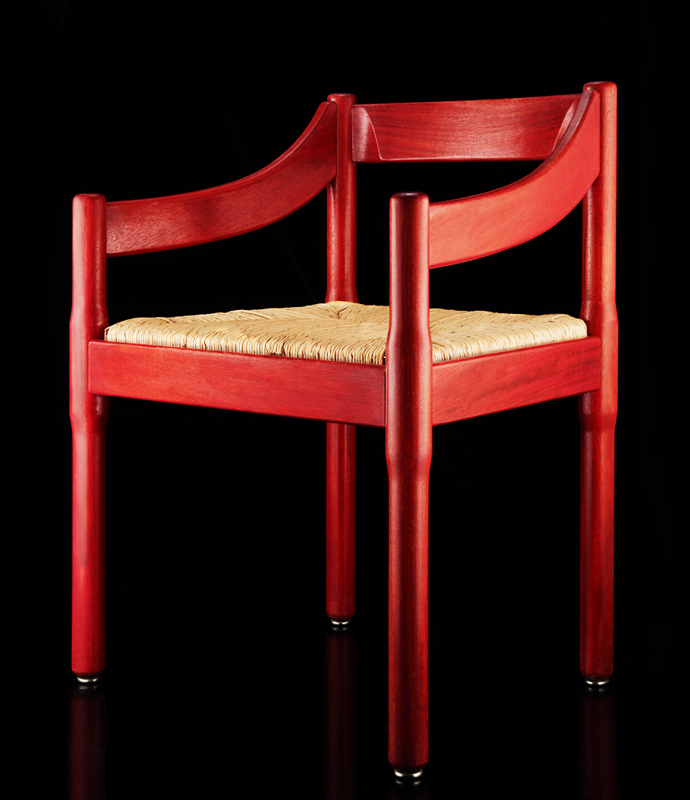
Carimate Chair designed by Vico Magistretti in 1959 and produced by Cassina

The "Amedeo Cassina" company was created by the brothers Cesare and Umberto Cassina in 1927 in Meda, Brianza, (Northern Italy). After the war, Cassina continued to expand in size and fame, with products which covered a broad range of furniture including: chairs, armchairs, tables, sofas and beds.

== History ==
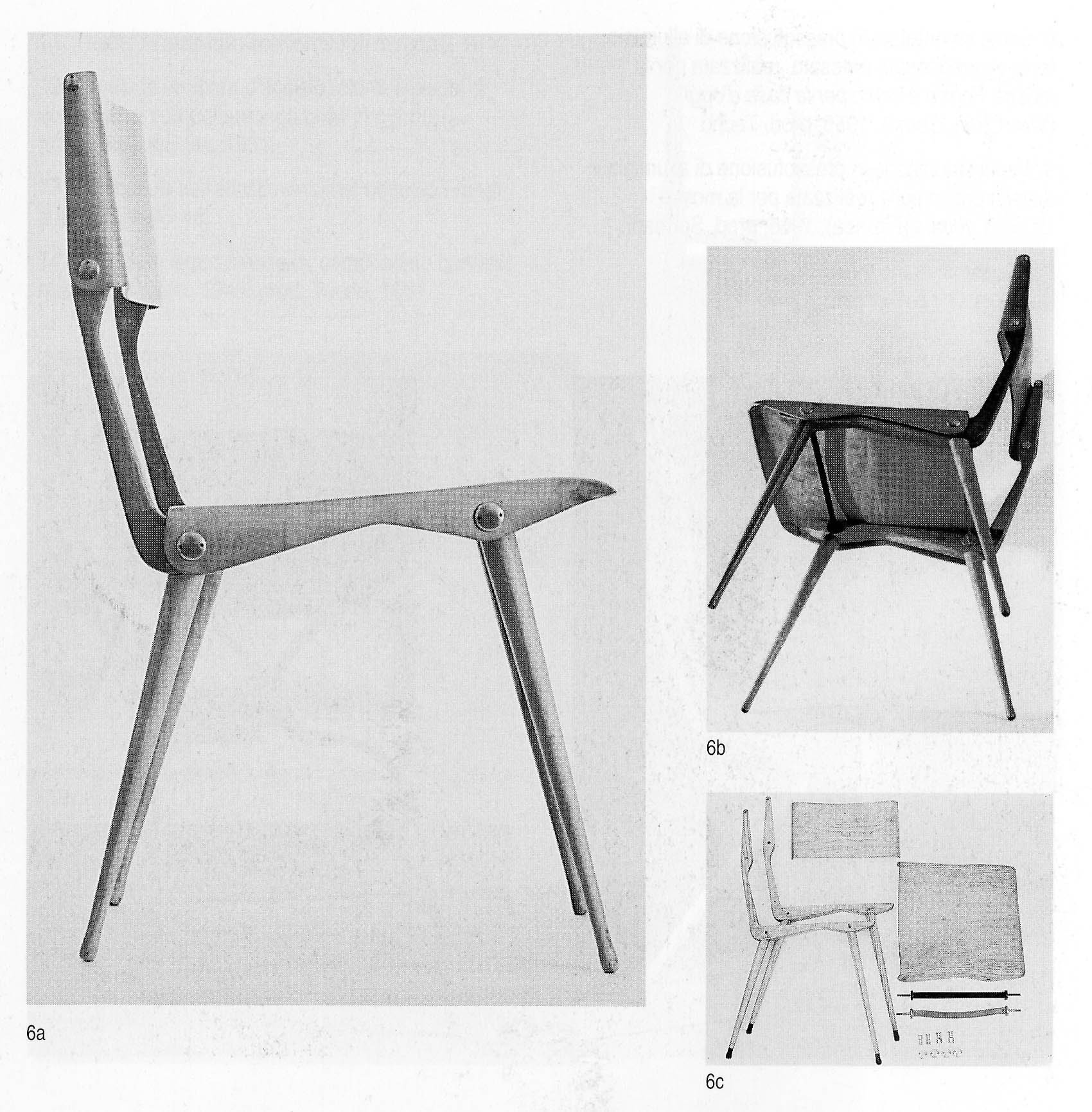
Model 683 chair designed by Carlo De Carli was awarded the 1954 Compasso d'Oro

The company's transformation was bolstered further by commissions for cruise ships, top end hotels and restaurants which accounted for a great part of the company's activity right up to the mid-sixties and beyond.

In 1964 the "Cassina I Maestri" (Cassina Masters) Collection was born, with the acquisition of the rights to products designed by Le Corbusier, Pierre Jeanneret and Charlotte Perriand, the most important names of 20th century design. These included the LC1, LC2, and LC3 armchairs, and the LC4 chaise longue. Today Cassina is the exclusive worldwide licensee of the Le Corbusier designs.

The "Cassina I Maestri" collection was widened in 1968 with the acquisition from Bauhaus-Archiv in Berlin of reproduction rights to some of the Bauhaus objects and, in 1971, the designs of Gerrit Rietveld, Frank Lloyd Wright, and of Charles Rennie Mackintosh in 1972. The Masters collection continued with the re-issue in 1983 of furniture by Erik Gunner Asplund, the acquisition from the Frank Lloyd Wright Foundation of rights of reproduction (1986) of furniture by Frank Lloyd Wright, including the Barrel chair (1937), and, finally, in 2004 furniture by Charlotte Perriand.

The 1972, the New York Museum of Modern Art exhibition, "Italy: the New Domestic Landscape" curated by Emilio Ambasz, was co-sponsored Cassina. In 2005 Cassina was purchased by the Poltrona Frau Group.

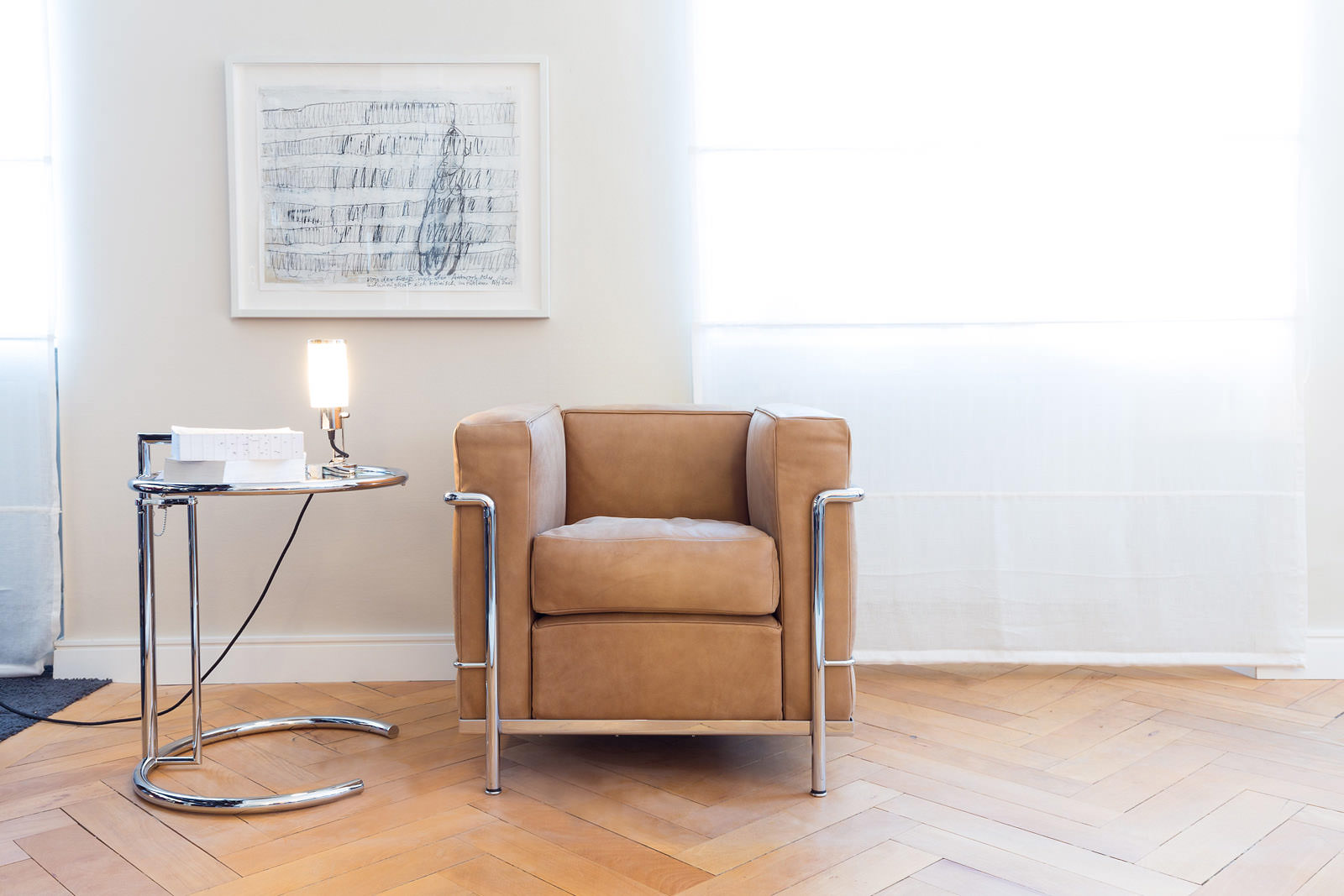
LC2 armchair designed by Le Corbusier, Pierre Jeanneret, and Charlotte Perriand (1928) and Eileen Gray side table

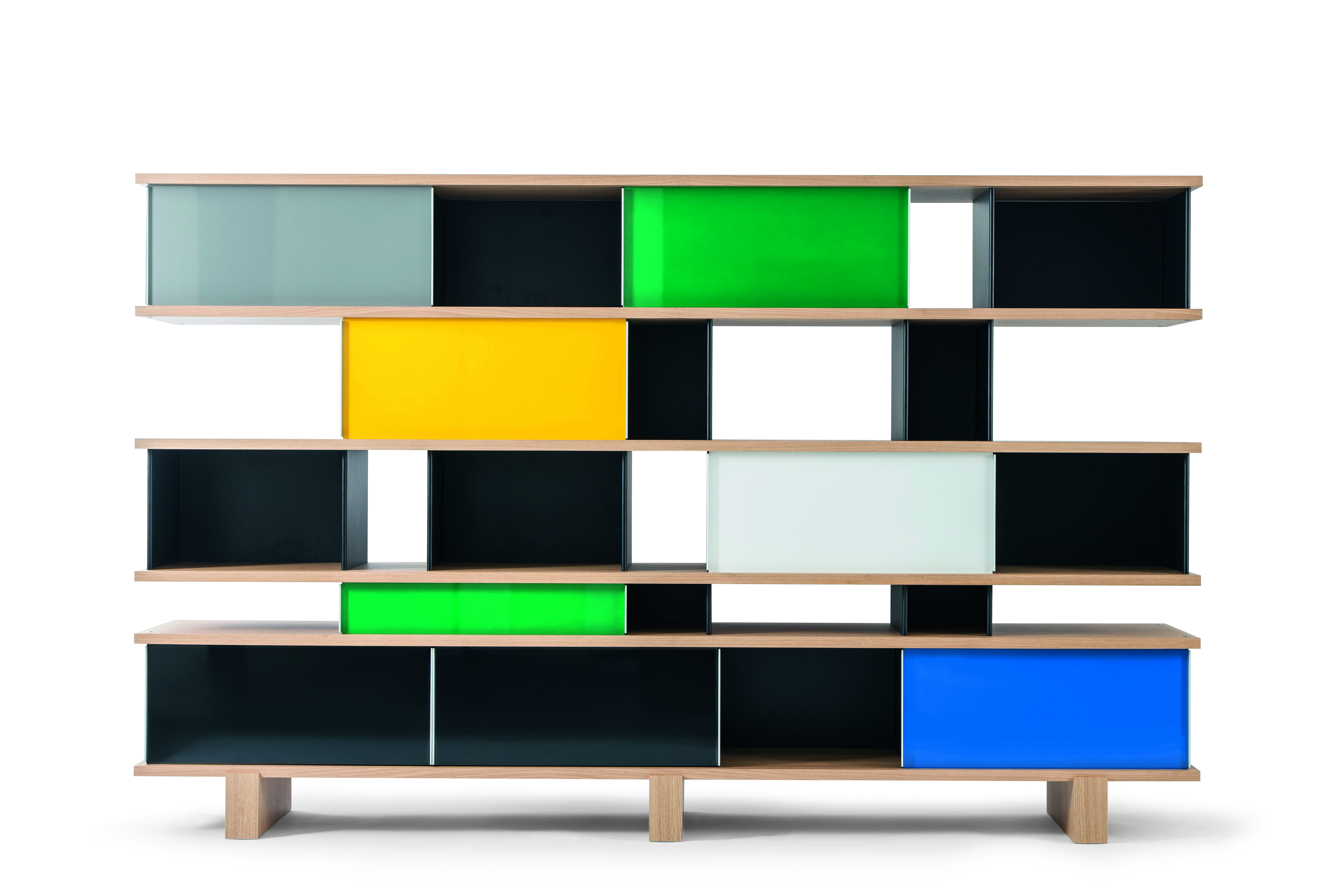
Nuage bookcase designed by Charlotte Perriand

== See also ==
- List of Italian companies
