= B&B Italia =

Italian furniture company

- Company type: Private
- Industry: Home interiors: Furniture and Design; Luxury Goods
- Founded: 1966
- Headquarters: Novedrate, Italy
- Area served: Worldwide
- Key people: The Busnelli Family
- Products: Upholstered Seating, Wood Products, Tables, Wall Units, Closets, Complements
- Number of employees: 643
- Website: www.bebitalia.com

B&B Italia SpA is an Italian modern furniture company founded in 1966 by Piero Ambrogio Busnelli, who had previously co-founded C&B Italia with Cesare Cassina. The company remains under the ownership and management of the Busnelli family. In 2021, designer Piero Lissoni was appointed its artistic director. B&B Italia is part of the Flos B&B Italia Group.

== History ==
On 1 March 2011, the Busnelli family regained majority ownership of the company and subsequently acquired all remaining shares.

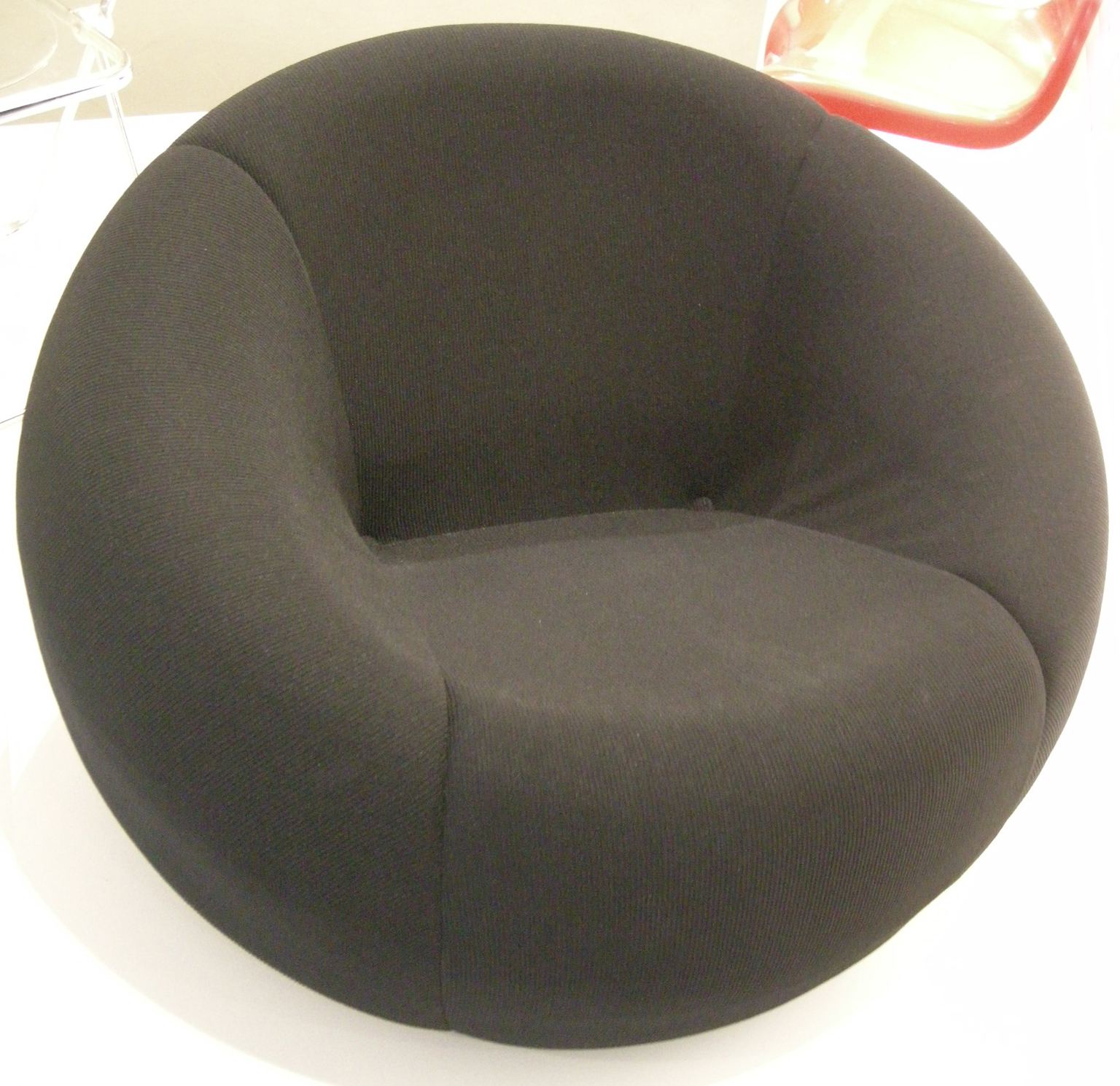
UP chair designed by Gaetano Pesce (1969)

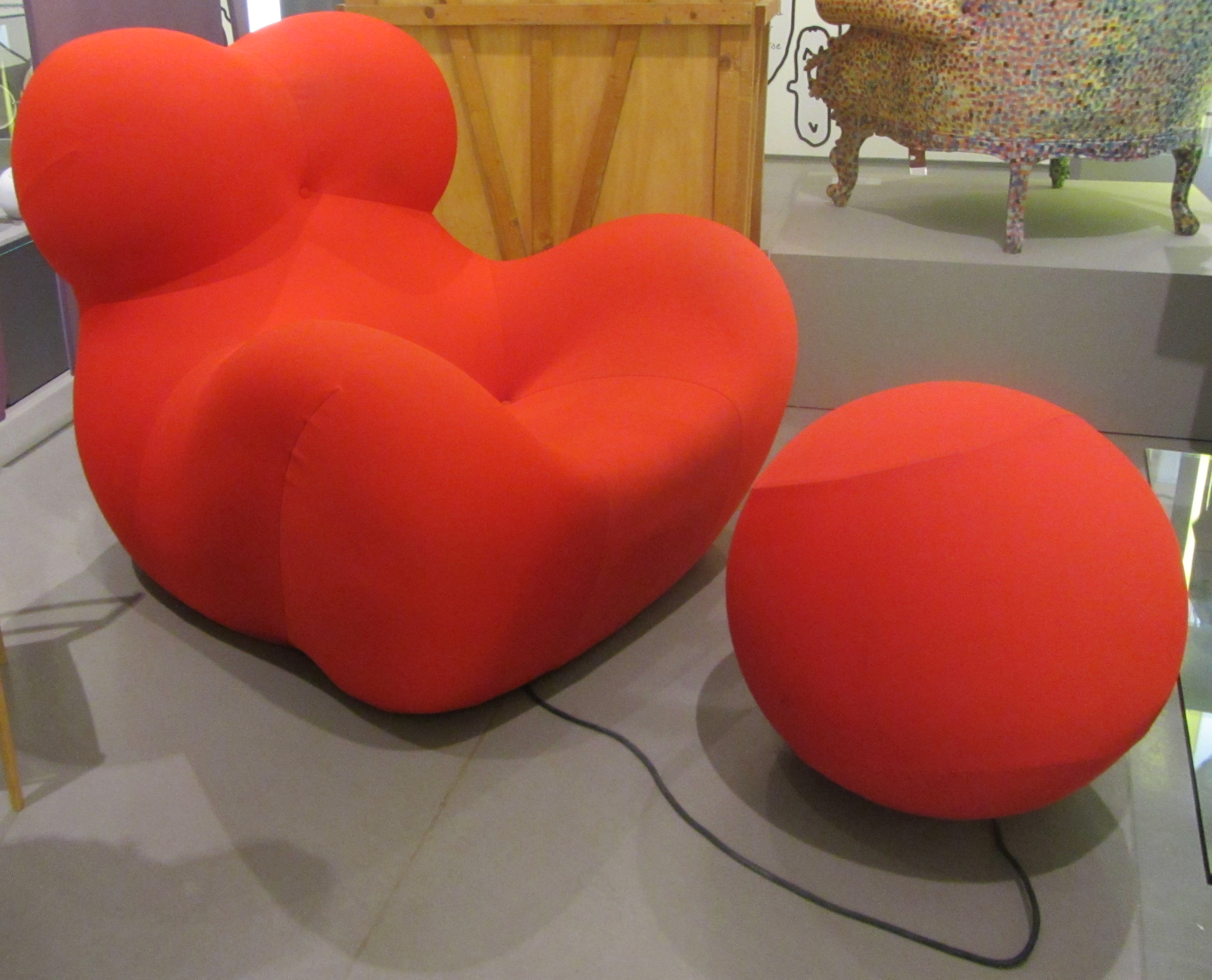
UP 5 and UP 6 designed by Gaetano Pesce

The United States subsidiary, B&B Italia USA Inc., is based in Manhattan, New York City, in the Architects and Designers Building, which also houses the company's American flagship store.

B&B Italia has won four Compasso d'Oro awards: first in 1979 for Le Bambole by Mario Bellini, then in 1984 for Sisamo by Studio Kairos, and again in 1987 for Sity by Antonio Citterio. In 1989, B&B Italia became the first company to receive a Compasso d'Oro awarded directly to a design manufacturing entity. Since 1966, B&B Italia has produced more than 1,000 designs, including prototypes.

Designers who have worked with the B&B Italia design department include Antonio Citterio, Patricia Urquiola, Gaetano Pesce, Naoto Fukasawa, Zaha Hadid, Marcel Wanders, Richard Sapper, Afra and Tobia Scarpa, Jean-Marie Massaud, Jeffrey Bernett, Mario Bellini, Studio Kairos, Paolo Piva, Richard Schultz, Atelier Oï, David Chipperfield, C. Gerhards and A. Glücker, Chris Howker, Ettore Sottsass, Gabriele and Oscar Buratti, Jakob Wagner, Monica Armani, Nicole Aebischer, Roberto Barbieri, Uwe Fischer, Jasper Morrison, Marc Newson, and Vincent Van Duysen.

More than 3% of B&B Italia's annual sales are reinvested in research and development. In 2010, a foaming department for upholstery was established through an investment of €4 million.

With the entry of The Carlyle Group into Investindustrial's design plan, Design Holding was established in September 2018 with the aim of creating an Italian hub of high-end interior design. Later, it expanded internationally. The brands already controlled by Investindustrial became part of the new company, led by Gabriele Del Torchio: Flos, B&B Italia, and the Danish company Louis Poulsen.

The B&B Italia Group owns the brands B&B Italia, Maxalto, Azucena, and Arclinea. In 2019, it reported revenues of €201.4 million, with exports accounting for over 80% of total sales. Its products are sold in 80 countries through a distribution network comprising 10 flagship stores, 70 single-brand stores, and approximately 1,000 resellers.

In January 2025, the group announced the appointment of Piero Gandini as executive chairman. Gandini, who previously served at Flos, took over from Daniel Lalonde. The company plans to expand its business internationally.

Flos B&B Italia Group is jointly owned by investment firms Investindustrial and Carlyle Group.

== Collections ==
B&B Italia has two divisions: the Home Division (focused on the residential market) and the Contract Division (for hospitality, marine, retail, and offices). The two brands are B&B Italia and Maxalto. Within B&B Italia, there are four collections.

B&B Italia Home: Defined by products such as the Up Series Chair by Gaetano Pesce, the Charles Sofa by Antonio Citterio, Tufty Time by Patricia Urquiola and The Moon System Sofa by Zaha Hadid, the B&B Italia Home Collection is the base upon which the company was built.

Maxalto: The Maxalto collection was established in 1975. The collection includes products with shapes drawing inspiration from the typologies and styles of French design between the two World Wars. Maxalto is a line of interior furnishings designed and coordinated by Antonio Citterio. Maxalto is often sold within B&B Italia stores, but in the last decade, has established itself more and more as its own brand. The first stand-alone Maxalto store opened in Paris, France. In 2008, the first monobrand store in the US opened in Chicago, Illinois, followed soon after by one in Miami, Florida.

There are four collections within Maxalto: Apta, Simplice, AC, and Acro, which was released in 2010. Maxalto was featured in 2008 in the James Bond film Quantum of Solace.

B&B Italia Outdoor: Designed for indoor/outdoor living. It started with Canasta by Patricia Urquiola in 2007. Since then, the collection has grown to include pieces by Jean-Marie Massaud and Marcel Wanders in addition to new pieces by Patricia Urquiola and Atelier Oï. New products for the line are being designed by Naoto Fukasawa and Antonio Citterio.

B&B Italia Project: The Project Collection is a range of tables, chairs, and soft seating for the contract market. It is often used in workplaces, restaurants, hotels, and public spaces.

B&B Italia Object: The Object Collection includes vases, trays, bowls, pillows, lighting, and accessories.

B&B Italia Contract: The B&B Italia Contract Division handles the "turnkey" projects for furnishings and/or layout in hotel areas, offices, retail, institutions, stores, cruise liners, etc. The Contract Division manages contracts for furnishings, from projects to logistics and from materials procurement to installation. The Contract Division has completed the newly opened W Retreat and Spa of Vieques Island designed with Patricia Urquiola and The Nieuw Amsterdam Luxury Cruise Line for Holland America with 1564 cabins. It was launched in Venice on July 4. Future projects include the W Hotel St. Petersburg designed by Antonio Citterio and two exclusive resorts in Greece.

MOOOI: B&B Italia previously held a stake in the Dutch design company Moooi, co-founded in 2001 by Marcel Wanders and Casper Vissers. In January 2015, Wanders and Vissers repurchased B&B Italia's remaining shares, regaining full ownership of the company.

Distribution: B&B Italia and Maxalto have 750 points of sale worldwide, including seven flagship stores (in Milan, London, Munich, Paris, Chicago, and two in New York City), 20 monobrand stores, and over 70 "shop-in-shops".

== Designers ==
- Antonio Citterio
- Patricia Urquiola
- Naoto Fukasawa
- Gaetano Pesce
- Paolo Piva
- Jeffrey Bernett
- Studio Kairos
- Zaha Hadid
- Edward Barber and Jay Osgerby
- Afra and Tobia Scarpa
- Mario Bellini
- Gabriele and Oscar Buratti
- Atelier Oï
- C. Gerhards and A. Glücker
- Chris Howker
- David Chipperfield
- Jakob Wagner
- Jean-Marie Massaud
- Marcel Wanders
- Monica Armani
- Nicole Aebischer
- Roberto Barbieri
- Uwe Fischer

== See also ==
- List of Italian companies
