= List of industrial designers =

The following industrial designers and product designers are among those who are noted for their accomplishments in industrial or product design, and/or who have made extraordinary contributions to industrial-design or philosophy.

This list is categorized by the main design movements of the twentieth century. Although many industrial designers of this list followed many such trends, they are listed under the movement with which they are most associated.

== Arts and Crafts movement (1850–1920) ==
- Walter Crane (1845–1915)
- William R. Lethaby (1857–1931)
- Arthur Heygate Mackmurdo (1851–1942)
- William Morris (1834–1896)
- Charles Voysey (1857–1941)
- Philip Webb (1831–1915)

== The aesthetic movement (1860–1890) ==
- Charles Robert Ashbee (1863–1942)
- Archibald Knox (1864–1933)

== Japonisme (1850–1920) ==
Also see Anglo japanese style

- Christopher Dresser (1834–1904)
- Edward William Godwin (1833–1886)

== Thonet Bentwood (1850–onwards) ==
- Thonet Bentwood

== Art Nouveau (1880–1910) ==
Also known as Vienna Secessionist in Austria, Jugendstil in Germany, Glasgow school in U.K.

- Victor Horta (1861–1947)
- Antoni Gaudí (1852–1926)
- Émile Gallé (1846–1904)
- Louis Majorelle (1859–1926)
- Henry Van de Velde (1863–1957)

== Glasgow School (1880–1929) ==
- Charles Rennie Mackintosh (1868–1929)
- Margaret MacDonald (1864–1933)
- Frances MacDonald (1873–1921)
- Herbert MacNair (1868–1955)

== The Vienna Secession (1895–1905) ==
Note – This category also includes designers of the Wiener Werkstätte (1905–1932)

- Wilhelm Bernatzik(1853–1906)
- Josef Hoffmann (1870–1956)
- Gustav Klimt (1862–1918)
- Max Kurzweil (1867–1916)
- Koloman Moser (1868–1918)
- Joseph Maria Olbrich 1867–1908)
- Lilly Reich (1885–1947)
- Otto Wagner (1841–1918)

== Jugendstil (1895–1905) ==
- Joseph Maria Olbrich 1867–1908)
- Henry van de Velde (1863–1957)
- Peter Behrens (1868–1940)

== Modernism (1910–1939) ==
- Alvar Aalto (1898–1976)
- Le Corbusier (1887–1965) Villa Savoye (built 1928 and 1931)
- Eileen Gray (1878–1976) E-1027 (built 1926–1929)
- Charlotte Perriand (1903–1999)
- Lilly Reich (1885–1947)
- Eero Saarinen (1910–1961) TWA Flight Center (built 1962)
- Carlo Scarpa (1906–1978)
- Frank Lloyd Wright (1867–1959) Fallingwater (built 1935)

== De Stijl (1917–1928) ==
- Theo van Doesburg (1883–1931)
- Gerrit Rietveld (1888–1964)
- Sophie Taeuber-Arp (1889–1943)
- Mart Stam (1899–1986)

== Bauhaus (1920–1930) ==
- Walter Gropius (1883–1969)
- Marianne Brandt (1893–1983)
- Peter Behrens (1868–1940)
- Marcel Breuer (1902–1981)
- Josef Hartwig (1880–1956)
- Johannes Itten (1888–1967)
- Ludwig Mies van der Rohe (1886–1969)
- László Moholy-Nagy (1895–1946)
- Wilhelm Wagenfeld (1900–1990)
- Christian Dell (1893–1974)

=== Bauhaus Students ===
- Hans Bellmann (1911–1990)
- Max Bill (1908–1994)
- Herbert Hirche (1910–2002)
- Wilhelm Wagenfeld (1900–1990)

== Mid century modern (1945–1959) ==
- Don Albinson (1921–2008)
- Davis Allen (1916–1999)
- Gordon Andrews (1914–2001)
- Charles (1907–1978) and Ray Eames (1912–1988)
- Susan Kozma-Orlay (1913–2008)
- George Nakashima (1905–1990)
- George Nelson (1908–1986)
- Greta von Nessen (1898–1975)
- Eliot Noyes (1910–1977)
- Gio Ponti (1891–1979)
- David Rowland (1924–2010)
- Gaby Schreiber (1916–1991)

== Scandinavian design (1950s) ==
- Aino Aalto (1894–1949)
- Eero Aarnio (born 1932)
- Kaarina Aho (1925–1990)
- Sigvard Bernadotte (1907–2002)
- Kaj Franck (1911–1989)
- Simo Heikkilä (born 1943)
- Poul Henningsen (1894–1967)
- Arne Jacobsen (1902–1971)
- Jacob Jensen (1926–2015)
- Henning Koppel (1918–1981)
- Bruno Mathsson (1907–1988)
- Mona Morales-Schildt (1908–1999)
- Verner Panton (1926–1998)
- Jens Quistgaard (1919–2008)
- Timo Sarpaneva (1926–2006)
- Oiva Toikka (1931–2019)
- Tapio Wirkkala (1915–1985)
- Ilmari Tapiovaara (1914–1999)
- Sixten Sason (1912–1967)

== Art Deco (1919–1940) ==
- Maurice Ascalon (1913–2003)
- Alfonso Bialetti (1888–1970)
- George Carwardine (1887–1947)
- Marcello Nizzoli (1887–1969)
- Donald Deskey (1894–1989)
- Buckminster Fuller (1895–1983)
- George Jensen (1966–1935)
- Belle Kogan (1902–2000)
- Émile-Jacques Ruhlmann (1879–1933)
- Alexis de Sakhnoffsky (1901–1964)
- Viktor Schreckengost (1906–2008)
- Walter Dorwin Teague (1883–1960)
- Kem Weber (1889–1963)
- Russel Wright (1904–1976)
- Eva Zeisel (1906–2011)

== Constructivist architecture and Constructivism (art) (1920s – early 1930s) ==
- Moisei Ginzburg, architect (1892–1946)
- Alexander Rodchenko (1891–1956)
- Naum Gabo (1890–1977)
- László Moholy-Nagy (1895–1946)
- Antoine Pevsner (1886–1962)
- Lyubov Popova (1889–1924)
- Vladimir Tatlin (1885–1953)
- Hermann Glöckner, painter and sculptor (1889–1987)

== Streamline Moderne (1870–1939) ==
- Norman Bel Geddes (1893–1958)
- Henry Dreyfuss (1904–1972)
- Raymond Loewy (1893–1986)
- Kem Weber (1889–1963)

== Cultural Revolution Radical period (design) (1960–1979) ==
- Gaetano Pesce (born 1939)
- Archizoom (Florence)
- Superstudio (founded 1966) Florence, Italy
- Studio 65 (founded 1965)
- Piero Gilardi
- Piero Gatti, Cesare Paolini, Franco Teodoro (founded 1965), Turin, Italy

== Pop design (1960s) ==
- Harry Bertoia (1915–1978)
- Robin Day (1915–2010)
- Olivier Mourgue (born 1939)

== Italian design (1960–1970s) ==
- Filippo Alison (1930–2015)
- Gae Aulenti (1927–2012)
- Mario Bellini (born 1935)
- Cini Boeri (1924–2020)
- Achille Castiglioni (1918–2002)
- Livio Castiglioni (1911–1979)
- Pier Giacomo Castiglioni (1913–1968)
- Joe Colombo (1930–1971)
- Vico Magistretti (1920–2006)
- Angelo Mangiarotti (1921–2012)
- Pio Manzù (1939–1969)
- Alberto Meda (born 1945)
- Alessandro Mendini (1931–2019)
- Bruno Munari (1907–1998)
- Roberto Pezzetta (born 1946)
- Gio Ponti (1891–1979)
- Richard Sapper (1932–2015)
- Afra and Tobia Scarpa (born 1937 and 1935)
- Lella Vignelli (1934–2016)
- Massimo Vignelli (1931–2014)
- Marco Zanuso (1916–2001)
- Marcello Gandini (1938–2024)
- Piero Gatti, Cesare Paolini, Franco Teodoro (active 1965–1983)

== Postmodern architecture (1959) onwards ==
- Robert Venturi (1925–2018) and Denise Scott Brown (born 1931)
- Michael Graves (1934–2015)
- Hans Hollein (1934–2014)
- Zaha Hadid (1950–2016)
- Frank Gehry (born 1929)

== Postmodernism: Style and Subversion 1970–1990 ==
- Ron Arad (born 1951)
- Luigi Colani (1928–2019)
- Ingo Maurer (1932–2019)
- Droog Design Founded 1993
- Philippe Starck (born 1949)

== Studio Alchimia (1976–1980) ==
- Michele De Lucchi (born 1951)
- Ettore Sottsass Jr. (1917–2007)
- Alessandro Mendini
- Andrea Branzi (born 1938)
- Paola Navone (born 1950)
- Trix & Robert Haussmann

== Memphis Group (1980–1987) ==
- Marco Zanuso (1916–2001)
- Ettore Sottsass (1917–2007)
- Alessandro Mendini(1931–2019)
- Michael Graves (1934–2015)
- Shiro Kuramata (1934–1991)
- Andrea Branzi (born 1938)
- George Sowden (born 1942)
- Peter Shire (born 1947)
- Javier Mariscal (born 1950)
- Michele De Lucchi (1951)
- Matteo Thun (born 1952)
- Aldo Cibic (born 1955)
- Nathalie du Pasquier (born 1957)
- Massimo Iosa Ghini (born 1959)
- Marco Zanini (born 1971)

== Japanese design and Architecture ==
- Tadao Ando (born 1942)
- Kenji Ekuan (1929–2015)
- Naoto Fukasawa (born 1956)
- Kenya Hara (born 1958)
- Isamu Kenmochi (1912–1971)
- Kengo Kuma (born 1954)
- Shiro Kuramata (1934–1991)
- Yoshihisa Maitani (1933–2009)
- Issey Miyake (born 1938)
- Isamu Noguchi (1904–1988)
- Oki Sato (born 1977)
- Tokujin Yoshioka (born 1967)

== Late 20th-century (born before 1975) ==
- Tom Ahlström (born 1943)
- Ron Arad (born 1951)
- Sebastian Bergne (born 1966)
- Sigvard Bernadotte (1907–2002)
- Edward Barber (born 1969)
- Yves Béhar (born 1967)
- Ayse Birsel (born 1964)
- Ronan Bouroullec (born 1971)
- Stephen Burks (born 1969)
- Don Chadwick (born 1936)
- Antonio Citterio (born 1955)
- Terence Conran (1931–2020)
- Niels Diffrient (1928–2013)
- Tom Dixon (born 1959)
- James Dyson (born 1947)
- Hartmut Esslinger (1944)
- Norman Foster (born 1935)
- Gianfranco Frattini (1926–2004)
- Naoto Fukasawa (born 1956)
- Stefano Giovannoni (born 1954)
- Giorgetto Giugiaro (born 1938)
- Kenneth Grange (born 1929)
- Konstantin Grcic (born 1965)
- Chuck Harrison (1931–2018)
- Sam Hecht (born 1969)
- Thomas Heatherwick (born 1970)
- David Hill (born 1957)
- John Hoke (born 1965)
- Richard Hutten (born 1967)
- James Irvine (1958–2013)
- Jonathan Ive (born 1967)
- Hella Jongerius (born 1963)
- Emeline King (born 1957)
- Herbert Lindinger (born 1933)
- Ross Lovegrove (born 1958)
- Carl Gustav Magnusson (born 1940)
- Pio Manzù (1939–1969)
- Jerry Manock (born 1944)
- Ingo Maurer (1932–2019)
- Alberto Meda (born 1945)
- David Mellor (1930–2009)
- Bill Moggridge (1943–2012)
- Jasper Morrison (born 1959)
- Marc Newson (born 1963)
- Jay Osgerby (born 1969)
- Satyendra Pakhale (born 1967)
- Neil Poulton (born 1963)
- Dieter Rams (born 1932)
- Karim Rashid (born 1960)
- David Rowland (1924–2010)
- Manuel Saez (born 1973)
- Denis Santachiara (born 1950)
- Inga Sempé (born 1968)
- George Sowden (born 1942)
- Philippe Starck (born 1949)
- Christopher Stringer (born 1965)
- Norman Teague (born 1968)
- Matteo Thun (born 1952)
- Patricia Urquiola (born 1961)
- Marcel Wanders (born 1963)
- Michael Young (born 1966)
- Nika Zupanc (born 1974)

== Contemporary designers (born after 1975) ==
- Virgil Abloh (1980–2021)
- Ini Archibong (born 1983)
- Daniel Arsham (Snarkitecture) (born 1980)
- Marjan van Aubel (born 1985)
- Erwan Bouroullec (born 1976)
- Simone Brewster (born c. 1983)
- David Caon (born 1977)
- Mac Collins (born 1995)
- Benjamin Hubert (born 1984)
- Yinka Ilori (born 1987)
- Max Lamb (born 1980)
- Philippe Malouin (born 1982)
- Sabine Marcelis (born 1985)
- Christien Meindertsma (born 1980)
- Jonathan Muecke (born 1983)
- Luca Nichetto (born 1976)
- Jonathan Olivares (born 1981)
- Neri Oxman (born 1976)
- Samuel Ross (born 1991)
- Oki Sato (born 1977)
- Wieki Somers (born 1976)
- Alexander Westerlund (born 1985)
- Bethan Laura Wood (born 1983)
- Giorgia Zanellato (born 1987)
