= Hume Modern =

American furniture restoration company

- Industry: Furniture restoration
- Founded: 1997
- Founder: Al Hume, Sheila Kaufman
- Headquarters: Los Angeles, California, U.S.
- Key people: Al Hume; Sheila Kaufman
- Brands: xtreames
- Services: Furniture restoration and preservation

Hume Modern is an American furniture restoration specialist. It is known for preserving items by Charles and Ray Eames, Florence Knoll, Eero Saarinen and other manufacturers of the American and European mid-century modern period. The company received plaudits in the wake of Hurricane Sandy for restoring items damaged by the New York/New Jersey seaboard. Hume Modern also restores pieces by Harry Bertoia, Warren Platner, George Nelson, Richard Schultz, Marcel Breuer, Frank Gehry, Mies van der Rohe and Herman Miller.

== Origin ==
Hume Modern was founded in 1997 by husband-and-wife team Al Hume and Sheila Kaufman. Hume, from Buckinghamshire, England, moved to Los Angeles and began repairing furniture for Jeff Kaufman (Shelia Kaufman's father). The latter was the Vice President of Jules Seltzer Associates, the oldest Herman Miller dealer in America.

Subsequently, Knoll Studio and Richard Schultz Design began directing their clients to Hume for restoration services based on a reputation for retaining the integrity, strength and value of each rare item of furniture. In 2011 Humemodern relocated from Venice Beach to a larger workshop in mid-city Los Angeles.

== Company milestones ==
- In 2006, Hume Modern and the Eames Office worked together on private restoration projects.
- In 2007, Hume Modern was awarded Herman Miller seating mechanic certification, allowing Humemodern to undertake product warranty repairs.
- In 2011, Herman Miller authorized Hume Modern to undertake the restoration and preservation of seating by Charles and Ray Eames.
- In September 2011, Hume Modern's customised furniture line xtreames was launched. It allows clients to customise Eames lounge chairs and ottomans to their personal tastes and specifications. Initial concepts included Warrior, Misfit and Trigger.
