= Charles Pollock (disambiguation) =

Charles Pollock may refer to:

- Charles Pollock (1902–1988), American abstract painter and brother of Jackson Pollock
- Charles Pollock (designer) (1930–2013), industrial designer
- Charles Pollock (photographer) (1828–1900), American photographer
- Charles Edward Pollock (1823–1897), English judge
