= Carl Gustav Magnusson =

Swedish architect and industrial designer

Carl Gustav Magnusson (born March 8, 1940) is an industrial designer, inventor, design juror and lecturer.

== Life and career ==
Carl Gustav Magnusson was born in Malmö, Sweden, and grew up in Canada, including Innisfail, Alberta; Toronto, Ontario, where he attended St. Andrew's College, Aurora; and Vancouver, British Columbia, where he attended St. George's School (Vancouver). He studied engineering and architecture at the University of Idaho and architecture at the Chalmers Institute of Technology in Gothenburg, Sweden. In 1967 he joined the Office of Charles and Ray Eames in California and, in 1969, Magnusson opened his own design practice in Rudolf Schindler's studio on Kings Road in West Hollywood, California.

Magnusson's prototype for a wooden toy system and hardware for a hanging fabric room divider manufactured by Fortress Chairs, Inc., were featured in "California Design 11," published in 1971.

=== Knoll ===
In 1976 Magnusson joined Knoll as Director of Graphics and Showroom Design and was named Director of Design for Europe shortly thereafter. He designed Knoll showrooms in London, Frankfurt, Stuttgart, Zurich, Florence, Rome, Amsterdam and Turin. In 1993, he was named Senior Vice President, Director of Design Worldwide, and, in 2003, Executive Vice President, Director of Design.

As a design director, Magnusson widened the range of designers that Knoll commissioned work from—recruiting both established and younger talents. In the late 1980s, Magnusson rekindled Knoll's relationship with Florence Knoll and renowned designers such as esthetic theorist Ettore Sottass, which led to numerous iconic pieces, including the Mandarin chair and the Spyder table. Sculptor Maya Lin collaborated closely with Magnusson in 1998 to create Knoll's Maya Lin line of furniture that Knoll continues to sell today. Similarly, architect Frank Gehry worked with Knoll to create Knoll's Fog Collection. His work with Ross Lovegrove led to a number of iconic products.

Magnusson continued to contribute his own designs to Knoll as well, including the Magnusson Desk (1993), the RPM Chair (1997), and modular office systems, the Spelo desk collection; Dividends, with David Noel; Currents, with Robert Reuter; and Autostrada, with Robert Reuter and Charlie Rozier.

During his 29 years at Knoll, Magnusson was also active as a curator and educator. He established the Knoll Design Symposium at Cranbrook Academy of the Arts in Bloomfield Hills and in 1997; he co-founded with Albert Pfeiffer (AIA) The Knoll Museum in East Greenville, Pennsylvania. With over 60 years of Knoll furniture designs, the museum is considered among the most comprehensive display of archival collector items by any furniture manufacturer.

=== Ongoing activities ===
Since retiring from Knoll in 2005, Magnusson has remained active as a designer, consultant and lecturer. In 2005, Magnusson founded CGM Design which serves furniture and automotive manufacturers in product development and design strategy. Today he continues in the fields of office design and environment, as well as lighting systems, automobiles, and household appliances, furnishings, and textiles. In addition to Knoll, he has designed products for Spinneybeck, Teknion, Stegner Engineering, Arexit, Momentum Textiles, Allseating, Nienkamper, and the MoMA Design Store (co-designed with his wife, architect Emanuela Frattini Magnusson).

He has lectured on design matters for BMW, Knoll, Maharam, AIA, Waterworks, IIDA, ArtCenter College of Design, Yale Library, Michael Graves College and SCAD, among others. Magnusson is a frequent jury member for design competitions internationally including iF Product Design Award, Yale School of Architecture, ArtCenter College of Design, and Good Design Awards. He also serves as an expert witness on design matters.

In 2012, the design industry publication Contract named him the 2012 design "legend" of the year, saying of him: "he is an industrial designer, as well as a curator, lecturer, mentor, inventor, organizer, talent scout, and visionary. And his influence has spread out in multiple directions around the globe."

== Personal life ==
Magnusson is married to architect Emanuela Frattini Magnusson. He has four children, Kolin Erik Magnusson, Gregor Daniel Magnusson, Cecilia Helen Magnusson, and Oliver Marco Magnusson, as well as grandchildren. Magnusson is also a Porsche aficionado, and he and his 912 Outlaw are featured in the book, "Porsche Outlaws."

== Design Awards ==
Magnusson has garnered more than 50 design awards throughout his career:

Year	Award	Organization	Details / Product
2026	2026 Prize Designs for Modern Furniture + Lighting Winners	Global Design News and Chicago Athenaeum	For Silent-Lectern.
2025	A+ Awards Jury Vote Winner	Architizer	For Otto Screens.
2025	PD25 Winner	Prize Designs for Modern Furniture + Lighting	For Silent Silo.
2025	A+ Awards Finalist	Architizer	For Otto Screens.
2024	Best of Year Awards	Interior Design (magazine)	For Otto Screens.
2024	Prize Designs Award	Global Design News	For Otto Screens.
2024	Good Design Award	Chicago Athenaeum	For Otto Screens.
2021	Good Design Award	Chicago Athenaeum	For Acumen Screens (with Spinneybeck).
2020	Good Design Award	Chicago Athenaeum	For Silent-Silo.
2019	Good Design Award	Chicago Athenaeum	For PRATA Chair (with Allseating).
2018	NeoCon Significant Contributor Design Innovation Award	NeoCon	N/A
2018	IDSA Excellence Award	Industrial Designers Society of America (IDSA)	For LYSS (with Allseating).
2018	Good Design Award	Chicago Athenaeum	For Zinc (now called Gemelli) and Exchange (with Allseating).
2017	Interior Design Best of Year Finalist	Interior Design (magazine)	For LYSS chair (with Allseating).
2017	Good Design Award	Chicago Athenaeum	For LYSS chair (with Allseating).
2017	A+ Awards	Architizer	For IVY umbrella stand (co-designed with Emanuela Frattini Magnusson).
2016	Good Design Award	Chicago Athenaeum	For IVY umbrella stand (co-designed with Emanuela Frattini Magnusson).
2015	Good Design Award	Chicago Athenaeum	For iDesk benching, work tables, and lounge system.
2013	Good Design Award	Chicago Athenaeum	For The Magnusson Collection (with Momentum).
2012	German Design Council Nominee	German Design Council	For Conflux (with Teknion).
2012	IDSA Design Award	Industrial Designers Society of America (IDSA)	For MAST Monitor Arm System (with Teknion).
2012	Best of NeoCon Gold Award (Innovative Materials)	NeoCon	For e2e.
2012	ASID International Design Award	American Society of Interior Designers	For MAST Monitor Arm System (with Teknion).
2012	IDEA/IDSA Design Award	IDEA / Industrial Designers Society of America (IDSA)	For MAST Monitor Arm System (with Teknion).
2012	Michigan Youth Arts Annual Innovation Award	Michigan Youth Arts	N/A
2012	Good Design Award	Chicago Athenaeum	For MAST Monitor Arm System (with Teknion).
2012	Contract Magazine Legend Award for Lifetime Achievement	Contract Magazine	Recognizing his roles as designer, curator, lecturer, mentor, inventor, organizer, talent scout, and visionary.
2011	German Design Council Nominee	German Design Council	For A-Fold.
2011	Interior Design Best of Year Honoree	Interior Design (magazine)	N/A
2011	Green Good Design Award	Chicago Athenaeum	For Conflux (with Teknion).
2011	International Forum Design	iF Product Design Award	For Conflux (with Teknion).
2010	International Forum Design	iF Product Design Award	For A-Fold tablet accessory.
2010	Buildings Magazine Grand Award (Innovation)	Buildings Magazine	For Conflux (with Teknion).
2010	NeoCon Gold Award (Lighting)	NeoCon	For Conflux (with Teknion).
2010	IIDA Circle of Excellence Award	IIDA	For Conflux (with Teknion).
2009	"MMQB Top Ten Products of the Decade"	MMQB	For Marketplace (with Teknion).
2009	IIDEX Silver Innovation Award	IIDEX	For FX Accessories (with Teknion).
2009	NeoCon Silver Award	NeoCon	For FX Accessories (with Teknion).
2009	FX International Interior Design Award	FX International	For FX Accessories (with Teknion).
2009	Interior Design and Sources Bloom Award (Best of Furniture)	Interior Design and Sources	For Synapse Chair (with Teknion).
2008	Good Design Award	Chicago Athenaeum	For Synapse Chair (with Teknion).
2008	Green Star Sustainability Award	Green Star	For Synapse Chair (with Teknion).
2008	NeoCon Gold Award	NeoCon	For Synapse Chair (with Teknion).
2007	International Forum Design	iF Product Design Award	For Marketplace System (with Teknion).
2007	IIDEX/NeoCon Canada Innovation Gold Award	IIDEX/NeoCon Canada	For Marketplace System (with Teknion).
1997	Lifetime Achievement Award	Pacific Design Center	Recognizing his contributions to design.
1978	Certificate of Excellence	American Institute of Graphic Arts (AIGA)	The Poster Show 1978.
1972	N/A	Industrial Design Magazine (now I.D. (magazine))	For Hanging Screen System.
1972	Ilo Liston Award	La Jolla Museum of Contemporary Art (now Museum of Contemporary Art San Diego)	"The Modern Chair: Its Origins and Evolution"
1969	N/A	Industrial Design Magazine (now I.D. (magazine))	For the San Diego Blood Bank.

== Patents ==
Patents by Carl Gustav Magnusson (newest first)
Patent	Type	Title	Filing date	Issue / publication date	Assignee	Co-inventors	Source
US 12,209,426 B2	Utility	Privacy enclosure	20 April 2021	28 January 2025	Spinneybeck Enterprises Inc.	Roger B. Wall; Joseph Cushing III	Justia
US 2023/0151626 A1	Application	Privacy enclosure (publication)	20 April 2021	18 May 2023 (pub.)	Spinneybeck Enterprises Inc.	Roger B. Wall; Joseph Cushing III	Justia
US D887,151 S	Design	Chair	5 June 2018	16 June 2020	—	—	Google Patents
US D860,668 S	Design	Chair	9 June 2017	24 September 2019	Allseating Corporation	—	Justia
US D730,148 S	Design	Drawer pull	8 October 2013	26 May 2015	Cherry Man Industries, Inc.	—	Justia
US D707,880 S	Design	Light fixture	8 October 2013	24 June 2014	Cherry Man Industries, Inc.	—	Justia
US 8,611,086 B2	Utility	Assembly for carrying/protecting a tablet computer	9 February 2011	17 December 2013	—	Carl G. Magnusson	Justia
US D662,940 S	Design	Support mast	10 June 2011	3 July 2012	Teknion Corporation	—	Justia
US D655,297 S	Design	Support arm	10 June 2011	6 March 2012	Teknion Limited	—	Justia
US 7,694,924 B2	Utility	Support assembly for work surface	31 August 2007	13 April 2010	TK Canada Limited	—	Justia
US D595,865 S	Design	Canopy	28 August 2007	7 July 2009	TK Canada Limited	—	Justia
US D586,589 S	Design	Table	8 February 2007	17 February 2009	TK Canada Ltd.	—	Justia
US 2009/0056598 A1	Application	Support assembly for work surface (publication)	31 August 2007	5 March 2009 (pub.)	TK Canada Limited	—	Justia
US D572,506 S	Design	Support structure for a table	27 June 2006	8 July 2008	TK Canada Limited	—	Justia
US D444,638 S	Design	Chair	9 June 2000	10 July 2001	Knoll, Inc.	—	Justia
US D434,233 S	Design	Lounge chair	4 May 2000	28 November 2000	—	Neil P. Frankel; Hendrik R. Van Hekken; William T. Shea	Justia
US D430,973 S	Design	Lounge chair	11 January 1999	19 September 2000	—	Neil P. Frankel; Hendrik R. Van Hekken; William T. Shea	Justia
US D423,241 S	Design	Chair	11 January 1999	25 April 2000	—	Michael L. McAllister; Lamar V. White; William T. Shea	Justia
US D422,424 S	Design	Chair	11 January 1999	11 April 2000	—	Frank Gehry; William T. Shea	Justia
US D415,634 S	Design	Table	12 January 1998	26 October 1999	—	Maya Lin; William T. Shea	Justia
US D410,351 S	Design	Storage cabinet	6 June 1997	1 June 1999	—	David P. Noel	Justia
US D408,646 S	Design	Chair	12 January 1998	27 April 1999	Knoll, Inc.	Maya Lin; Carl G. Magnusson	Justia
US D406,473 S	Design	Chaise lounge	12 January 1998	9 March 1999	Knoll, Inc.	Maya Lin; William T. Shea	Justia
US D406,198 S	Design	Chair	12 January 1998	2 March 1999	Knoll, Inc.	Maya Lin; William T. Shea	Justia
US D405,544 S	Design	Trim piece for office furniture system	5 June 1997	9 February 1999	Knoll, Inc.	—	Justia
US D396,793 S	Design	Furniture pull	6 June 1997	11 August 1998	Knoll, Inc.	—	Justia
US D362,983 S	Design	Table	31 January 1994	10 October 1995	Westinghouse Electric Corporation	—	Justia
US D356,338 S	Design	Pencil tray	24 January 1994	14 March 1995	Westinghouse Electric Corporation	—	Justia
US D341,260 S	Design	Chair	11 January 1990	16 November 1993	Westinghouse Electric Corp.	—	Justia
US D339,927 S	Design	Chair	11 January 1990	5 October 1993	Westinghouse Electric Corp.	Dale Fahnstrom; Michael McCoy	Justia

== Quotes ==
"Everything that I do has a certain mechanical logic to it, and follows my definition of design—which is function with cultural content."

"Cultural content imbues the item with our history, our inescapable style of our time and its values. Yet, a designed object must meet the functional and manufacturing cost requirements that allow customers to afford it. If the price is prohibitive then what function does it perform?"

== See also ==
- Industrial design
