= Charles Pollock (designer) =

American industrial designer (1930–2013)

- Born: 1930; Philadelphia
- Died: 20 August 2013, 2013; Queens
- Education: Cass Technical High School, Pratt Institute
- Occupation: Designer
- Employers: Castelli S.p.A.; Bernhardt Design; Florence Knoll; George Nelson

Charles Randolph Pollock (June 20, 1930 – August 20, 2013) was an industrial designer who created sleek furniture, most notably an office chair held together by a single aluminum band that became known as a Pollock Chair. This iconic chair, introduced in 1965 and still in production, became a staple of executive offices in the United States in the 1960s and can be seen, appropriately, in the period television show, Mad Men, as well as institutions such as the Smithsonian Institution and the Metropolitan Museum of Art.

== Education and early career ==
Pollock studied at Brooklyn's Pratt Institute, and after serving in the U.S. Army, he was hired by George Nelson. They designed and sold "swag leg" chairs, characterized by curved legs. These were commercially successful.

== Later career ==
Pollock's first chair for Knoll was the Model 657 armchair. It featured a one-piece leather sling seat and back with thin seat cushion, supported by chrome steel tubes and aluminum frame members. Knoll introduced the chair in 1961.

While the Model 657 chair was in production development, Pollock was also working on an executive office chair design for Knoll. The chair had an oval cross-section extruded aluminum frame that served as a structural support. This frame was polished and chrome plated. Slots in the frame held the black polypropylene shell along with the upholstery retaining rib. Various fabrics or leathers could be chosen for upholstery. Seating comfort was achieved using multi-density urethane foam. The chair could be ordered with or without black phenolic arms. The Pollock Executive Chair has remained in continuous production since it was introduced by Knoll in 1965.

After the production of the Pollock Chair for Knoll, Pollock designed the Penelope Chair for Castelli (1982). After this period, Pollock did not see success with new designs until Jerry Helling, head of Bernhardt Design, tracked him down and asked him to design furniture for his firm. Pollock then designed the CP lounge chair, a contoured chair which won critical praise.

Speaking about his work in a 2012 discussion with Jonathan Olivares, Pollack, then 82 years old said, "I want people to love to sit in my chairs. You gotta want the people to buy it because they love it."

== Death ==
Pollock died in a house fire in Queens, New York on August 20, 2013, at the age of 83. At the time of his death he was still at work on designs for new chairs.
