= Knoll, Inc. =

American furniture company

MillerKnoll, Inc.
- Type: Subsidiary
- Traded as: Nasdaq: MLKN; S&P 600 component
- Industry: Manufacturing
- Founded: 1938; 88 years ago
- Founders: Hans and Florence Knoll
- Headquarters: East Greenville, Pennsylvania, United States
- Key people: Christopher M. Baldwin, COO and MillerKnoll Group President
- Products: Designer furniture, office systems, textiles
- Parent: MillerKnoll, Inc.
- Website: knoll.com; millerknoll.com

Knoll (previously Knoll, Inc.; now a subsidiary brand of MillerKnoll, Inc.) is an American company that manufactures office and storage systems, furniture, textiles, and accessories. Its KnollStudio division is the licensed manufacturer of furniture designed by famous architects and designers such as Harry Bertoia, Ludwig Mies van der Rohe and Lilly Reich, Florence Knoll, Frank Gehry, Charles Gwathmey, Maya Lin, Marcel Breuer, Eero Saarinen, and Lella and Massimo Vignelli. Over 40 Knoll designs can be found in the permanent design collection of the Museum of Modern Art in New York City.

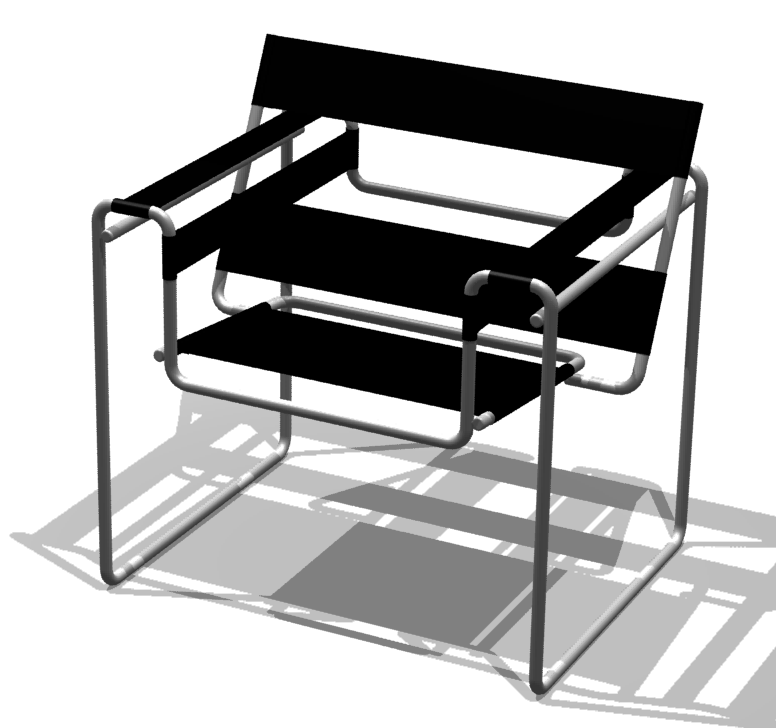
The Wassily chair by Marcel Breuer

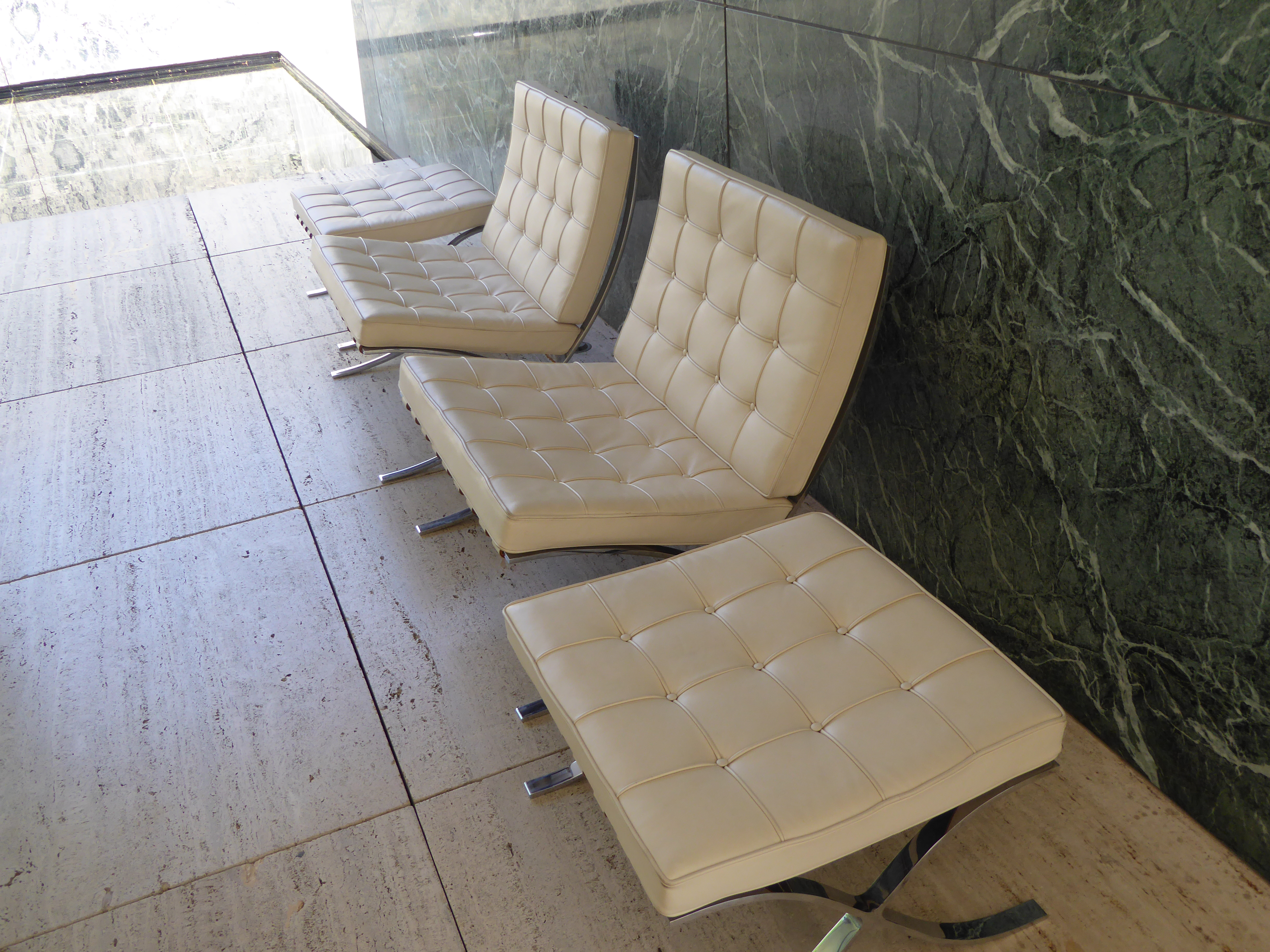
Barcelona chair and ottoman by Lilly Reich and Ludwig Mies van der Rohe

== History ==
The company was founded in New York City in 1938 by Hans Knoll. Production facilities were moved to Pennsylvania in 1950. After the death of Hans in 1955, his wife, Florence Knoll, took over as head of the company. The company is headquartered in East Greenville, Pennsylvania and has manufacturing sites in East Greenville, Grand Rapids, Muskegon, and Toronto in North America; it also manufactures products in Foligno and Graffignana in Italy.

In 2011, Knoll received the National Design Award for Corporate and Institutional Achievement from the Cooper Hewitt, Smithsonian Design Museum.

The acquisition of Knoll by Herman Miller was announced in April 2021 in a $1.8 billion deal. The merger closed in the third quarter of 2021. The merged company is listed on the Nasdaq Stock Market and trades under the symbol MLKN.

In July 2021, the company was rebranded as MillerKnoll.

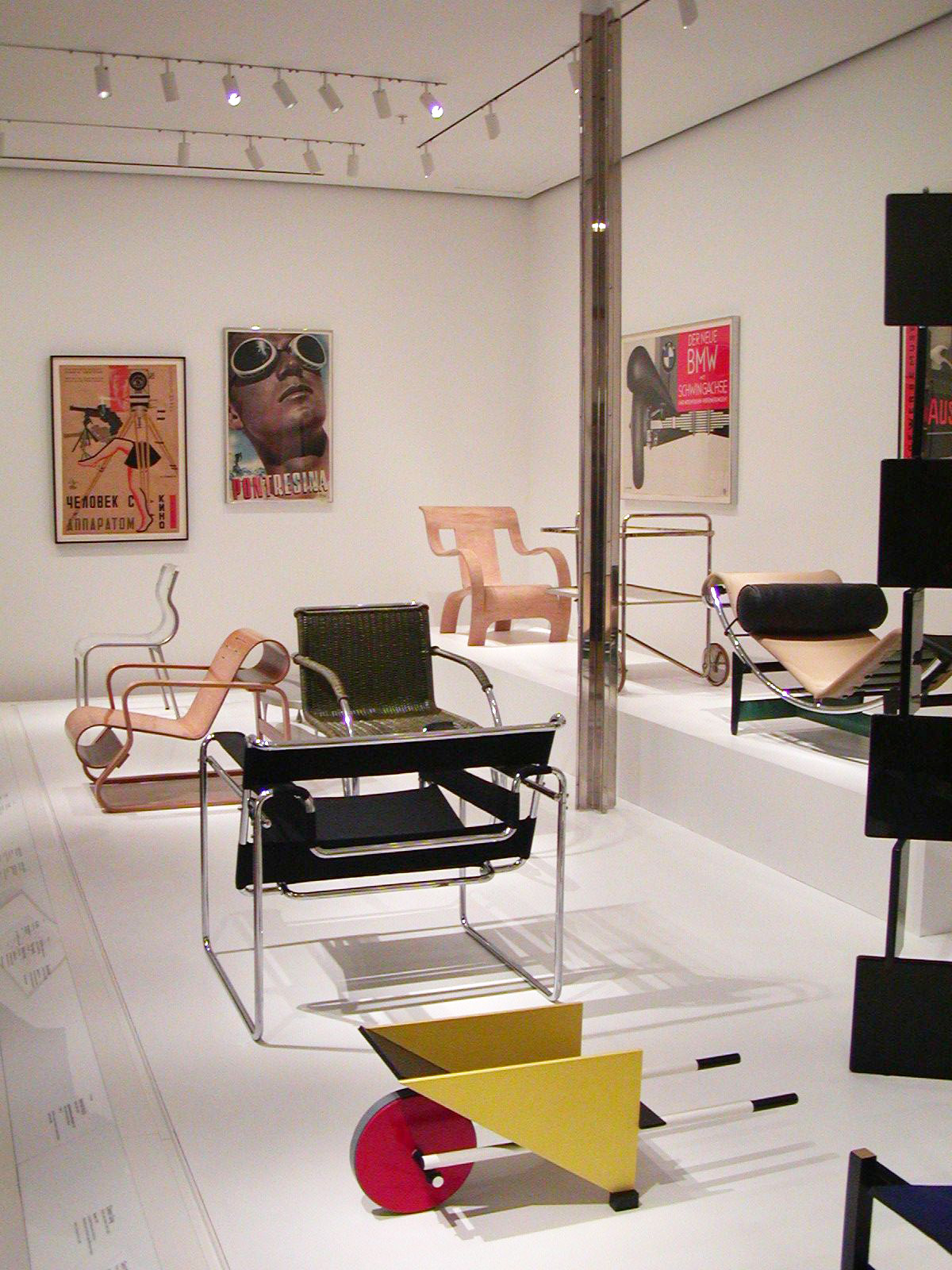
Many of the company's products are on permanent display at MoMA in NYC

== Notable designers ==
Designers who have worked for the company or whose designs are manufactured by Knoll include:

- Gerald Abramovitz
- David Adjaye
- Asymptote
- Ini Archibong
- Anni Albers
- Franco Albini
- Don Albinson
- Davis Allen
- Emilio Ambasz
- Raul de Armas
- Sergio Asti
- Gae Aulenti
- Jhane Barnes
- Hans Bellmann
- Harry Bertoia
- Ayse Birsel
- Cini Boeri
- Irma Boom
- Marcel Breuer
- Don Chadwick
- Maria Cornejo
- Mario Dal Fabbro
- Paolo Dell'Elce
- Niels Diffrient
- Peter Eisenman
- Gianfranco Frattini
- Frank Gehry
- Rudi Gernreich
- Alexander Girard
- Charles Gwathmey
- Bruce Hannah
- Eszter Haraszty
- Jorge Ferrari Hardoy
- Trix and Robert Haussmann
- Sheila Hicks
- Evelyn Hill
- Pierre Jeanneret
- Dozie Kanu
- Maya Lin
- Piero Lissoni
- Ross Lovegrove
- Vico Magistretti
- Carl Magnusson
- Angelo Mangiarotti
- Roberto Matta
- Herbert Matter
- Michael McCoy
- Richard Meier
- Ludwig Mies van der Rohe
- Abbott Miller
- Andrew Morrison
- Kate and Laura Mulleavy
- George Nakashima
- Marc Newson
- Isamu Noguchi
- Jonathan Olivares (Note: In April 2022 Jonathan Olivares joined Knoll as Senior Vice-President of Design.)
- Barber Osgerby
- Willo Perron
- Charles Pfister
- Warren Platner
- Charles Pollock
- Proenza Schouler
- Ralph Rapson
- Lilly Reich
- Jens Risom
- Rodarte
- Eero Saarinen
- Richard Sapper
- Tobia Scarpa
- Ruth Adler Schnee
- Richard Schultz
- Denise Scott Brown and Robert Venturi
- Robert Siegel
- Ettore Sottsass
- Stephen Sprouse
- Marianne Strengell
- Ilmari Tapiovaara
- Angelo Testa
- Suzanne Tick
- Lella and Massimo Vignelli
- Hans Wegner

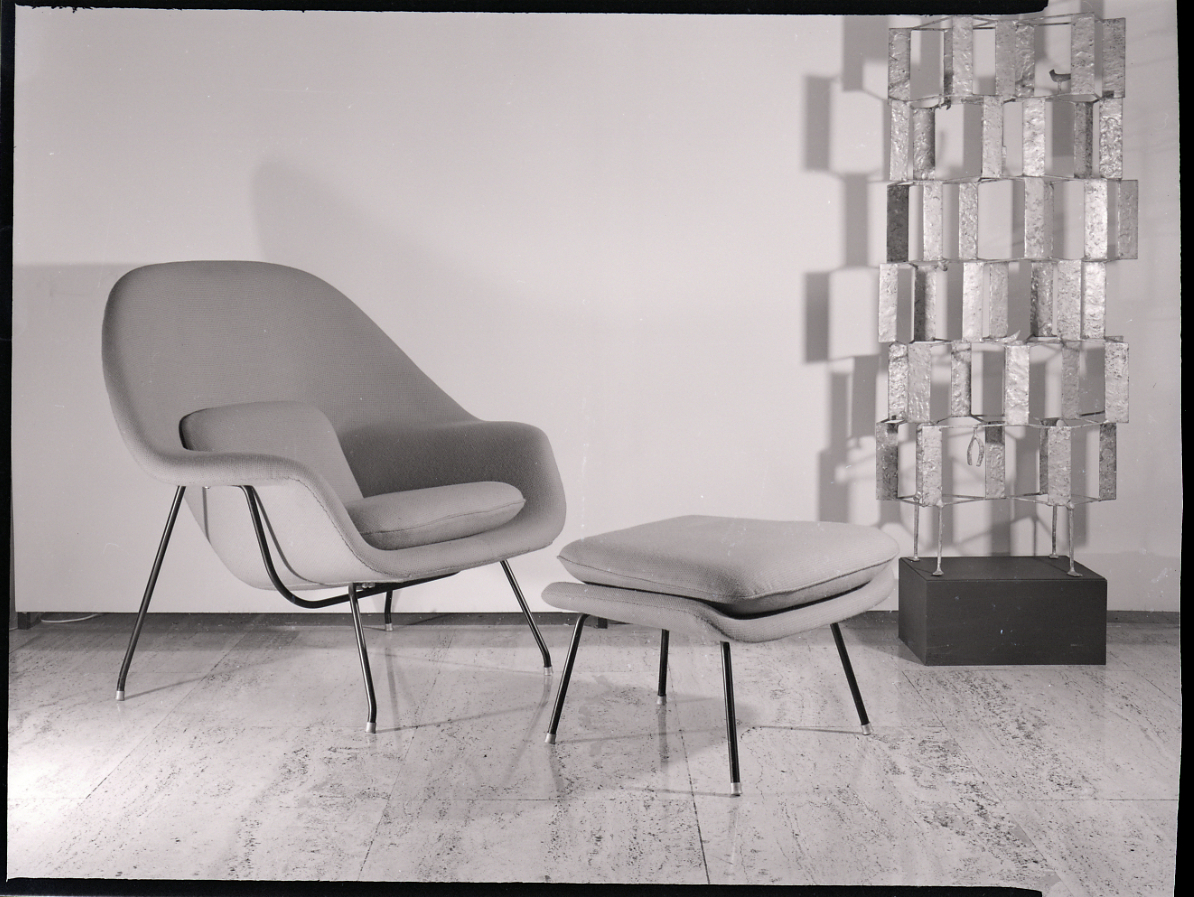
Womb lounge chair and ottoman by Eero Saarinen

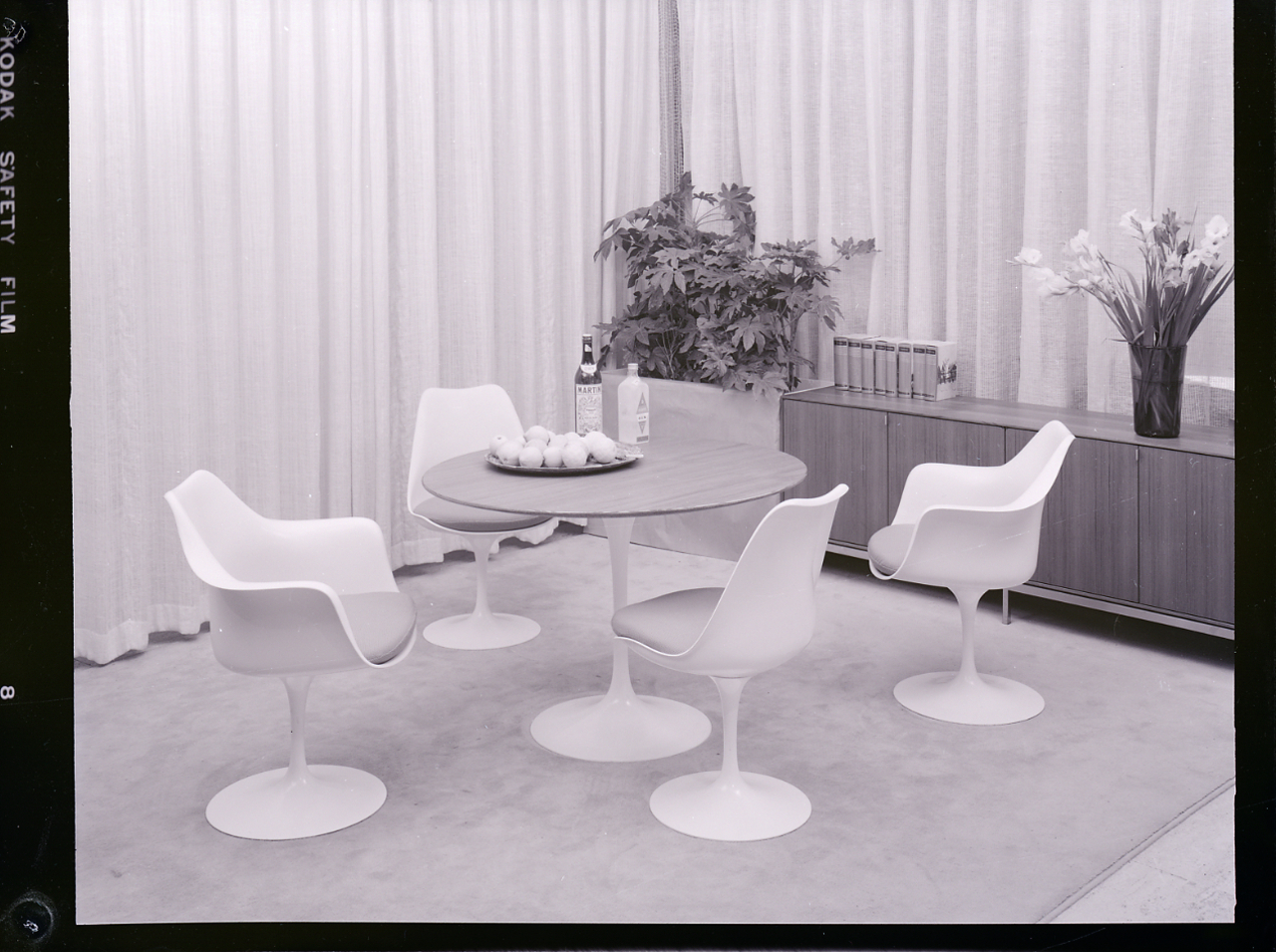
Saarinen table and chairs

== Significant products ==
Some of the company's products are included in museum collections, such as the Cooper-Hewitt, National Design Museum, the Philadelphia Museum of Art, and the Museum of Modern Art.

- In 1948, Eero Saarinen designed the womb chair.
- In 1956, the company commissioned Eero Saarinen to design the Tulip chair for production.
- Following the production of the tulip chair, the tulip table was designed by Saarinen.
- In 1953, the company was accorded exclusive manufacturing and sales rights to Ludwig Mies van der Rohe furniture, including the Barcelona chair, which was designed in collaboration with Lilly Reich for the 1929 Barcelona Pavilion.
- The company holds production rights to the Wassily Chair by Marcel Breuer.
- In 1947, Knoll acquired exclusive U.S. production rights of the Hardoy chair ("Butterfly chair") by Jorge Ferrari Hardoy. Cheaper imitations of the chair were also sold. Knoll took legal action in 1950, eventually losing its claim of copyright infringement; the model was dropped in 1951. In 2018, Knoll released a 100th anniversary tribute to the Butterfly Chair.

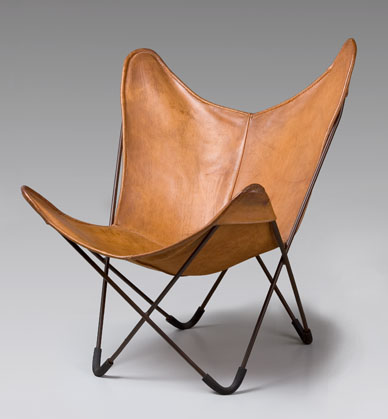
Butterfly chair

== Gallery ==
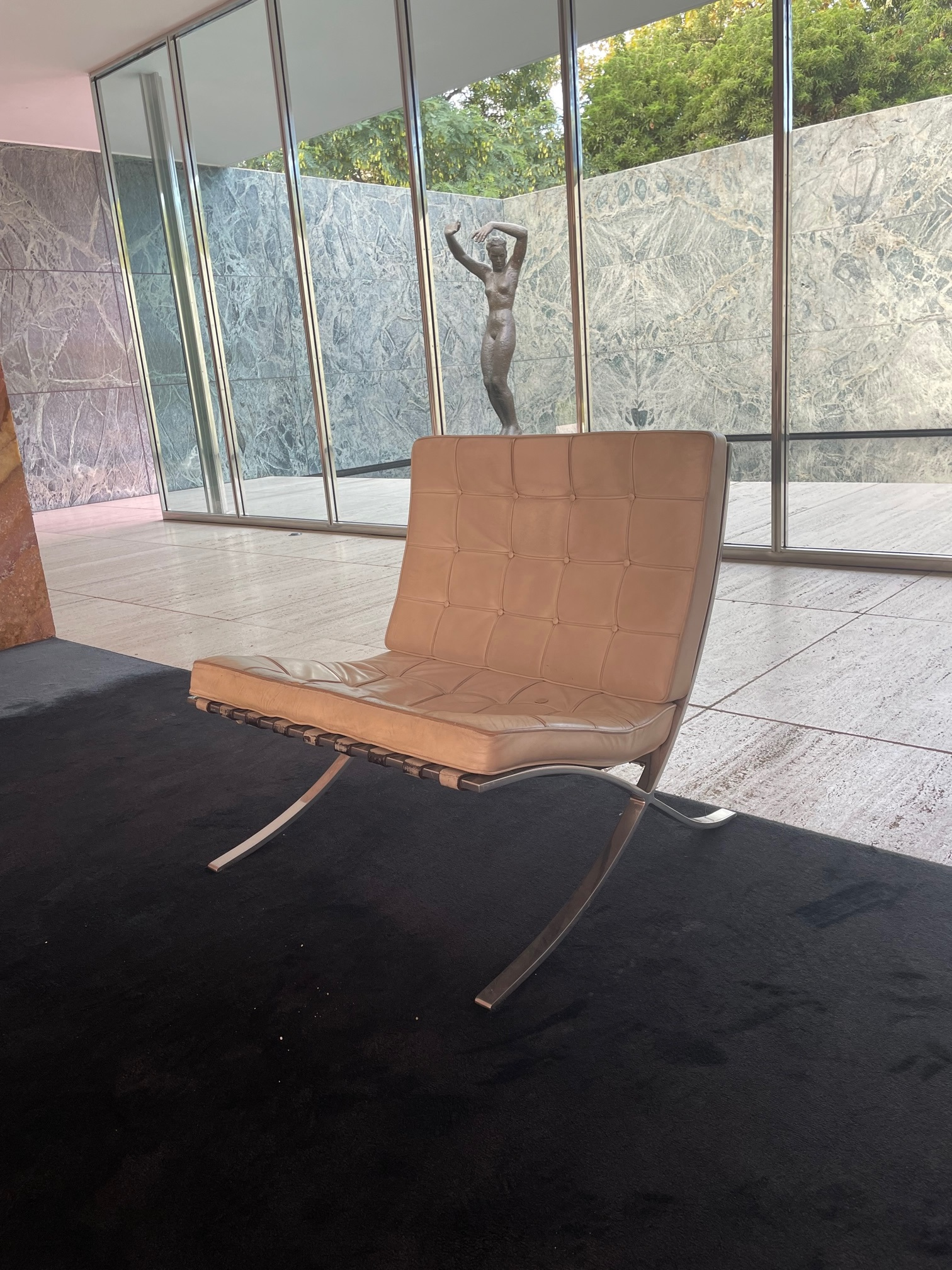
Barcelona Chair in situ at the reconstructed Barcelona Pavilion

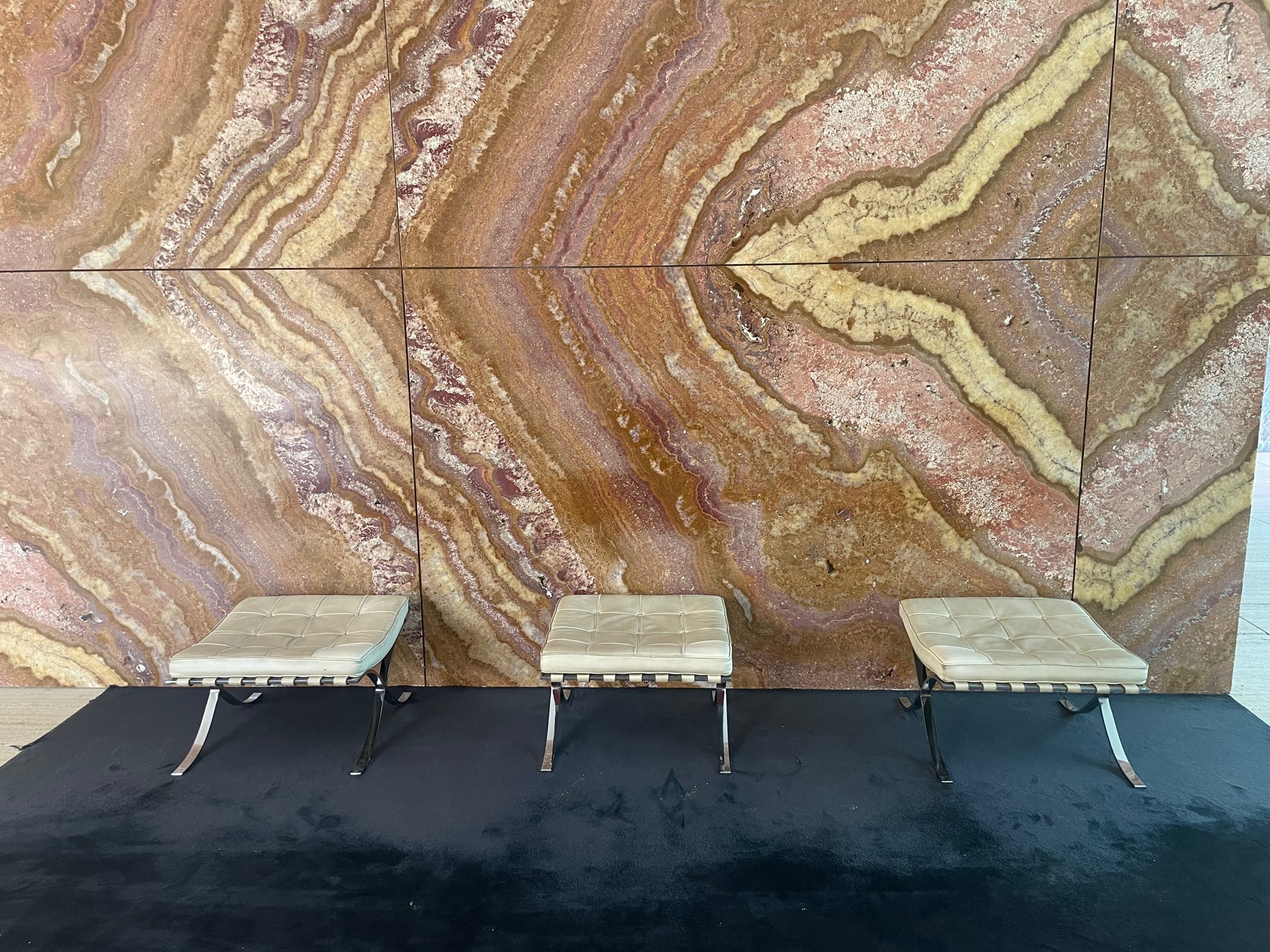
Barcelona Ottoman in situ at the reconstructed Barcelona Pavilion

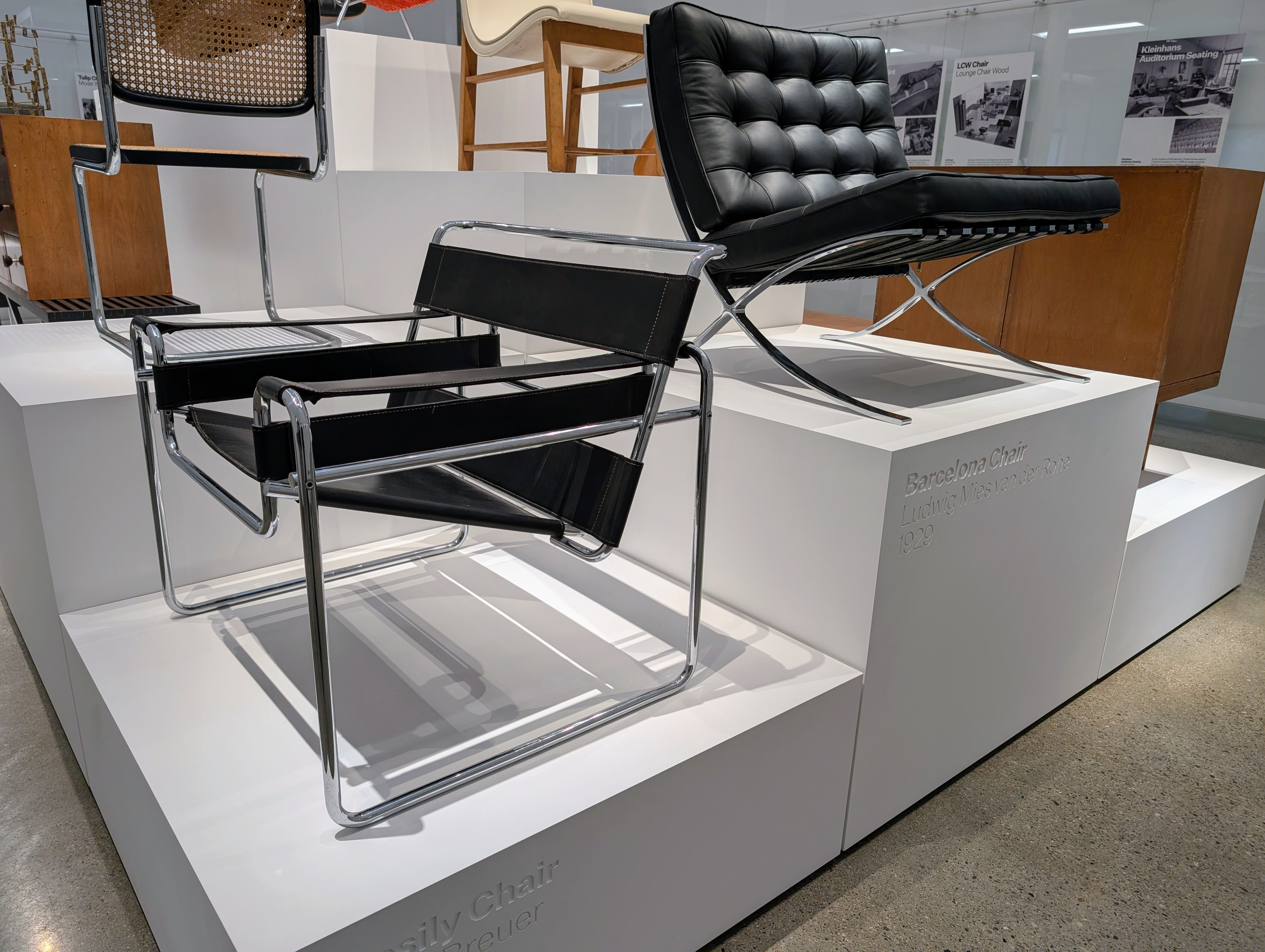
Wassily Chair and Barcelona Chair on display at the MillerKnoll Archives

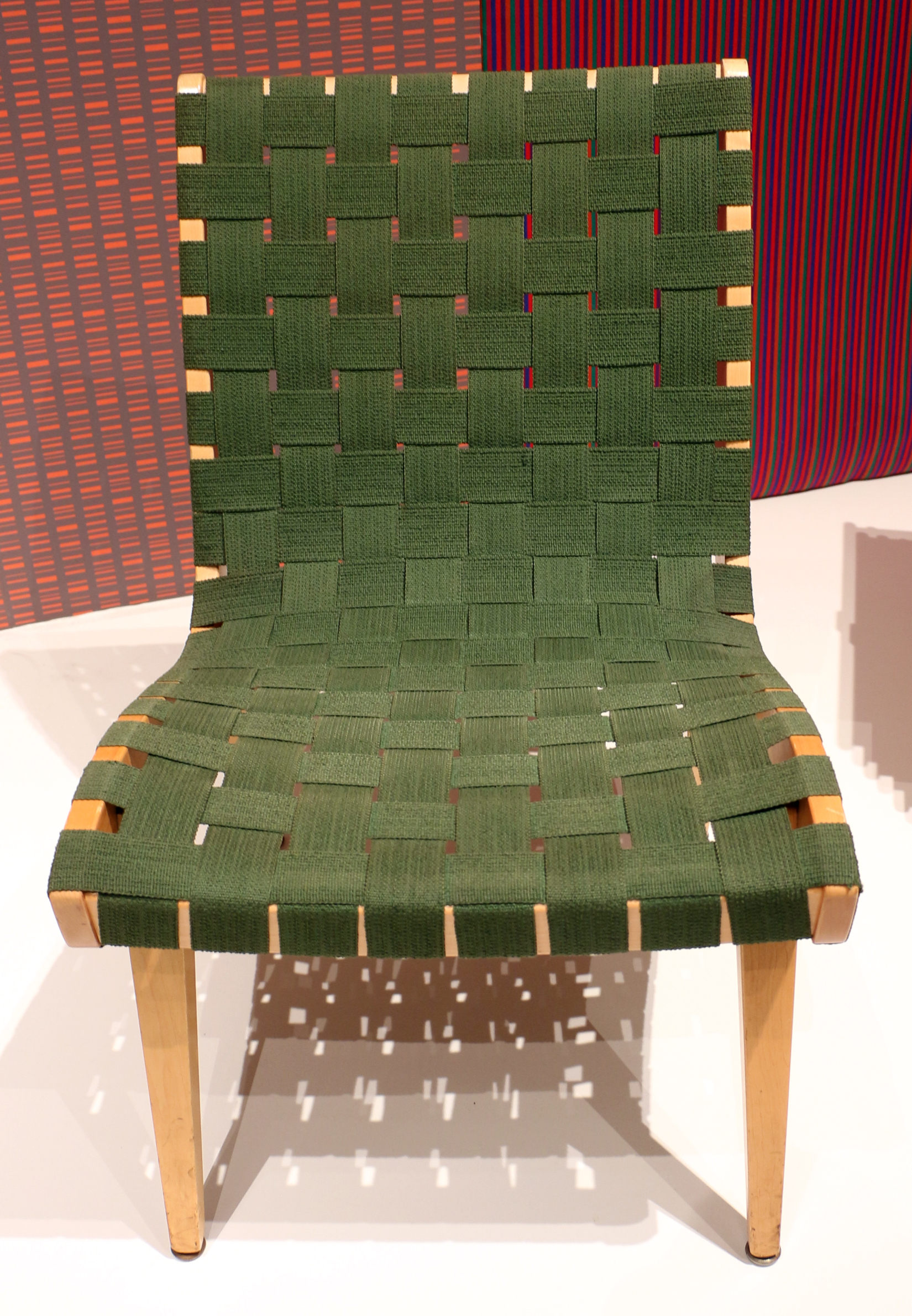
Model 650 designed by Jens Risom (1941)

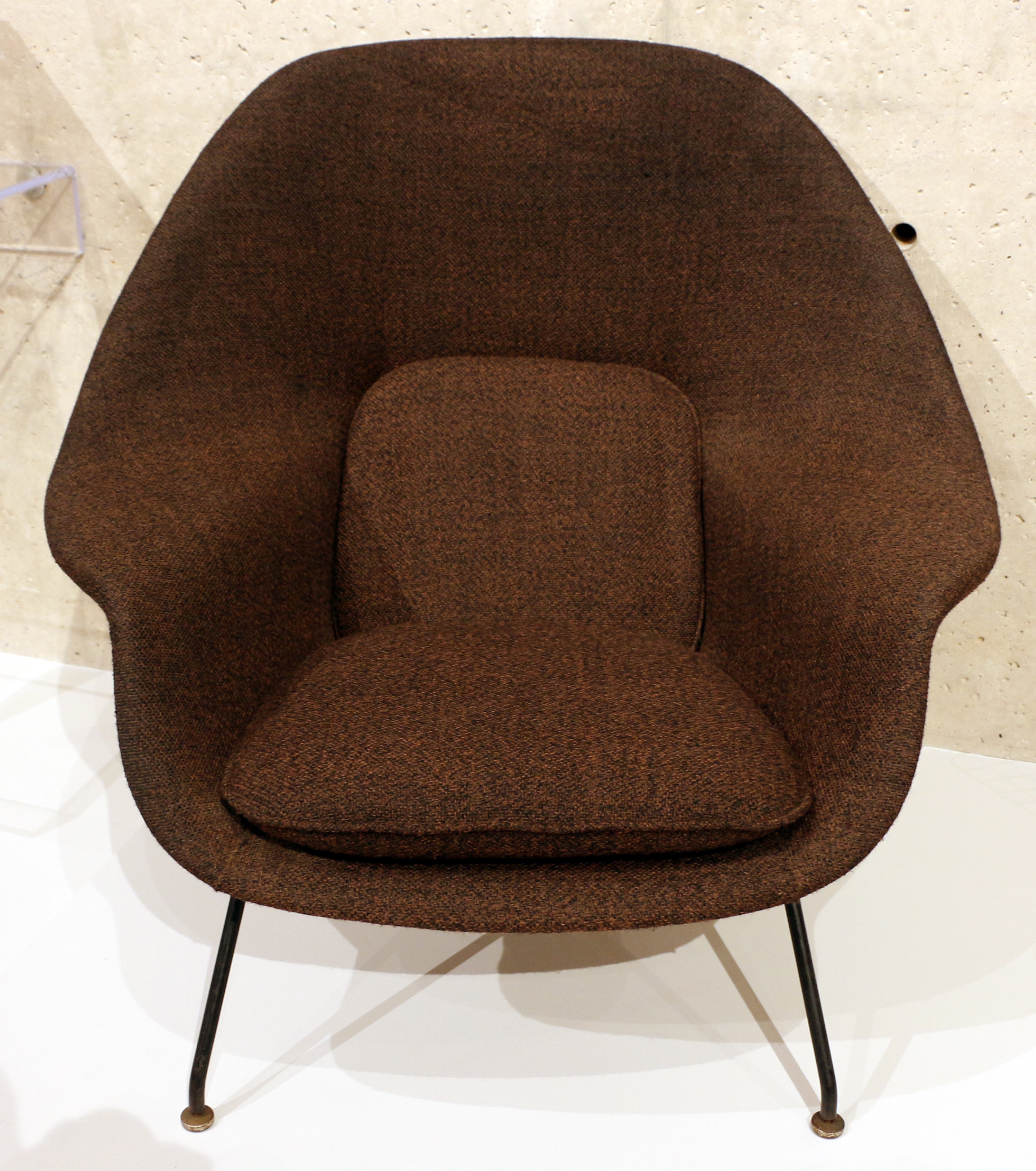
Womb lounge chair by Eero Saarinen (1947–1948)

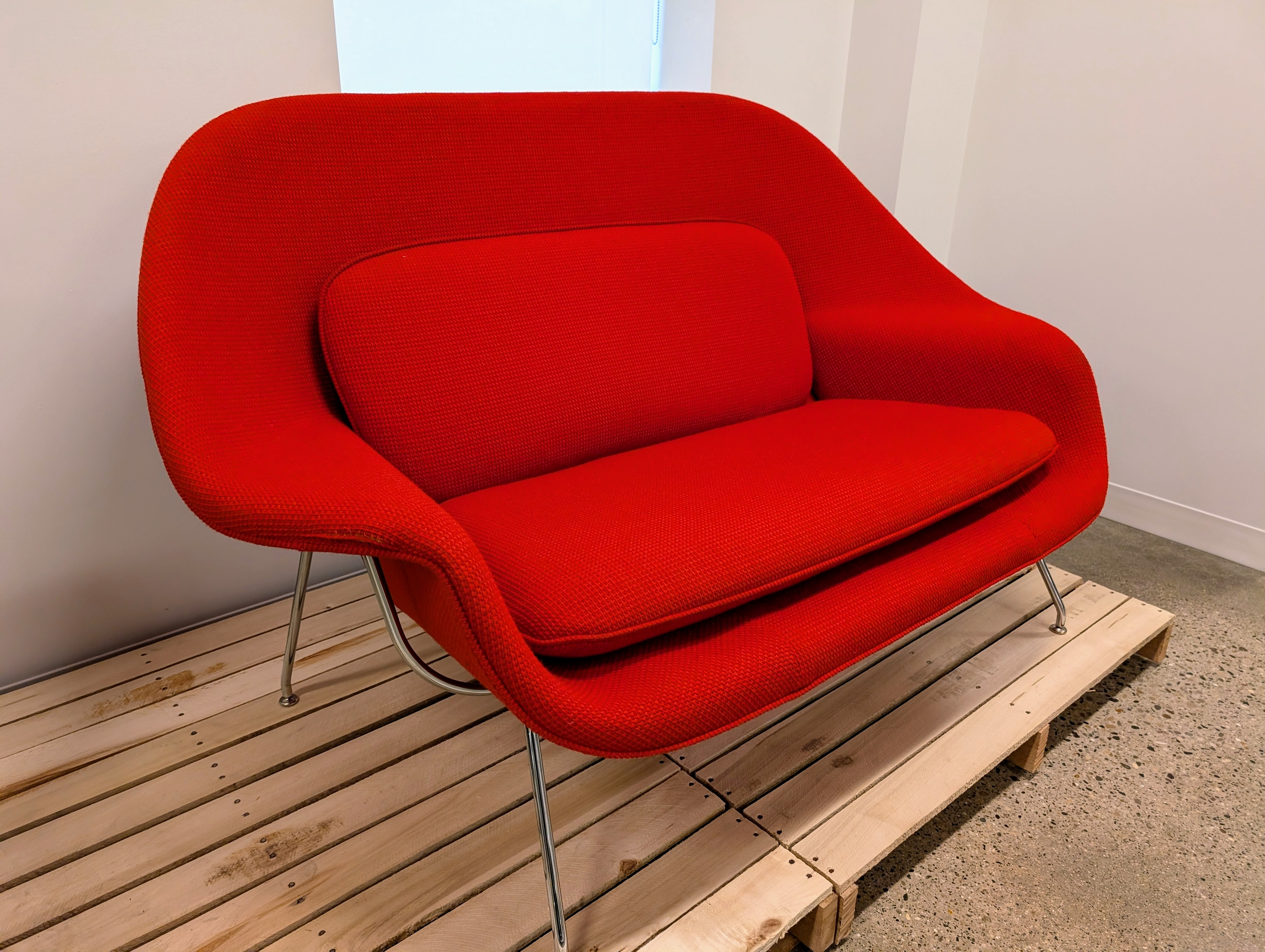
Womb lounge settee by Eero Saarinen

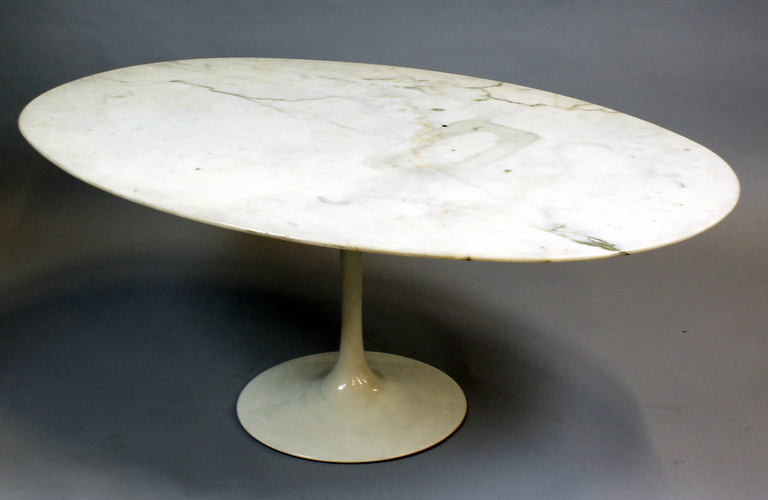
Saarinen table (1957)

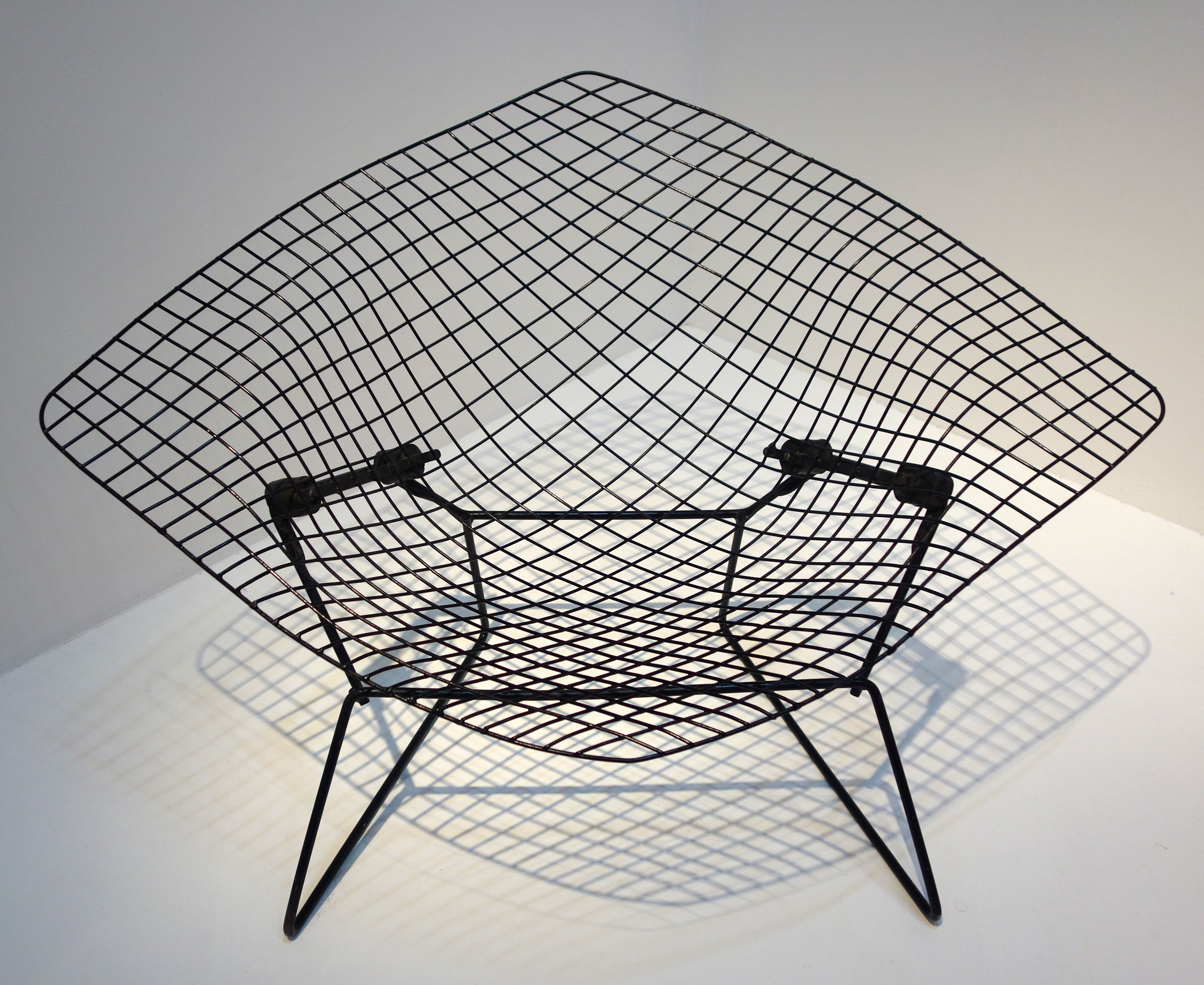
Diamond chair designed by Harry Bertoia

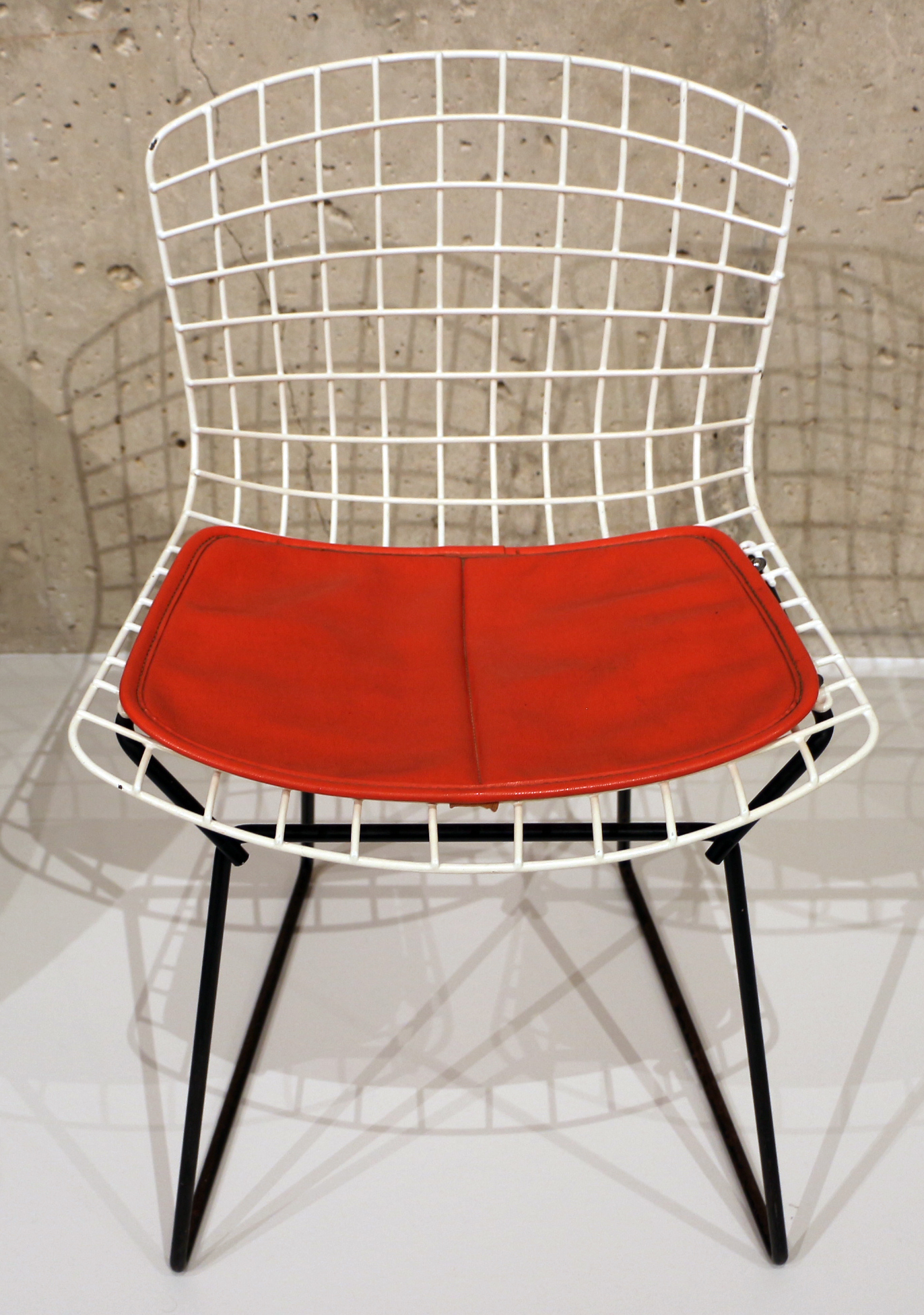
Model 426-2 designed by Harry Bertoia (1953)

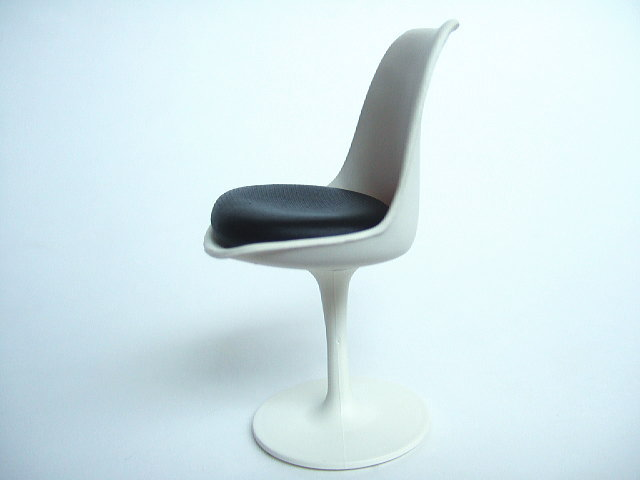
The Tulip chair, designed for Knoll by Eero Saarinen (1956)

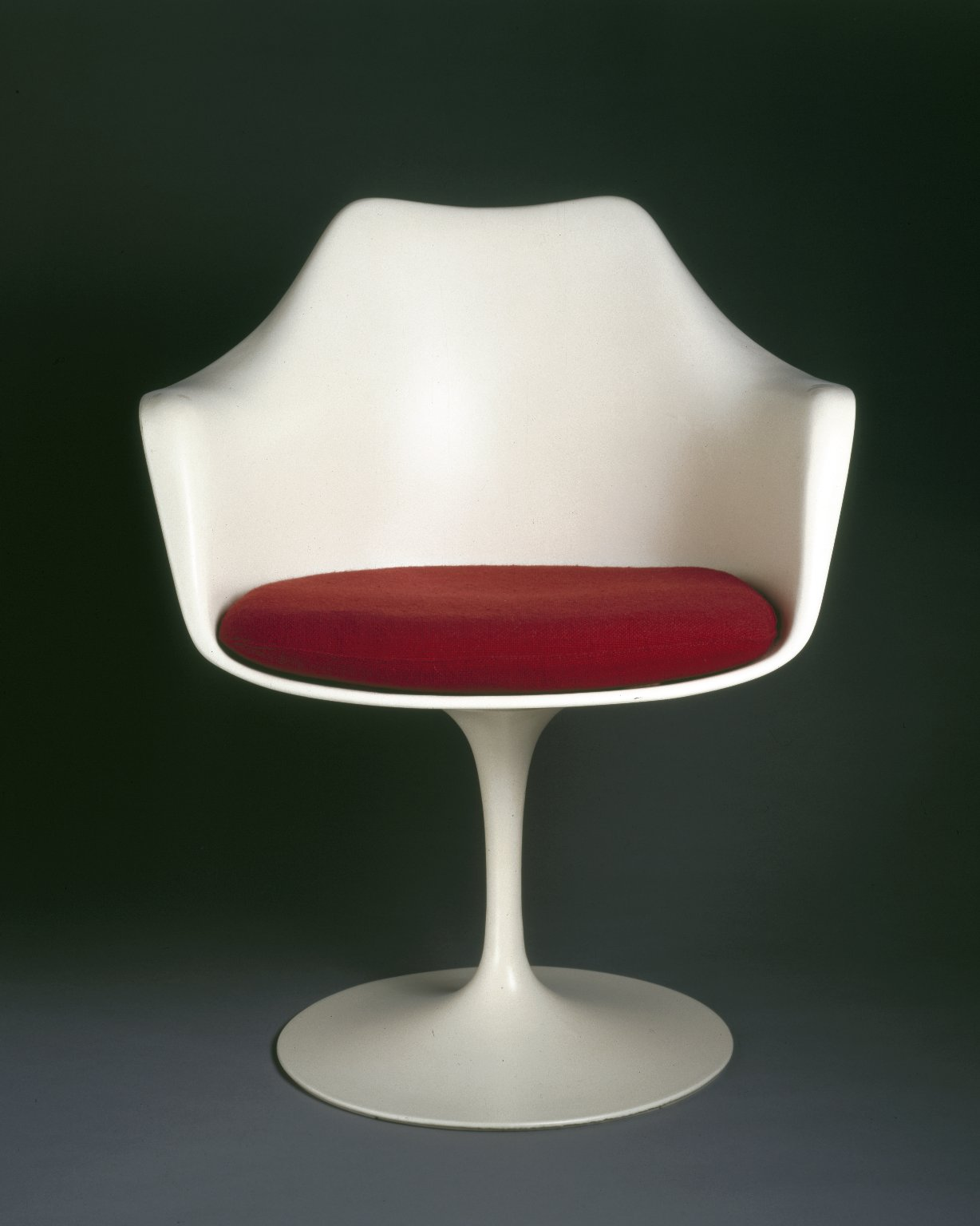
Pedestal armchair and Seat Cushion, designed by Eero Saarinen (1956)

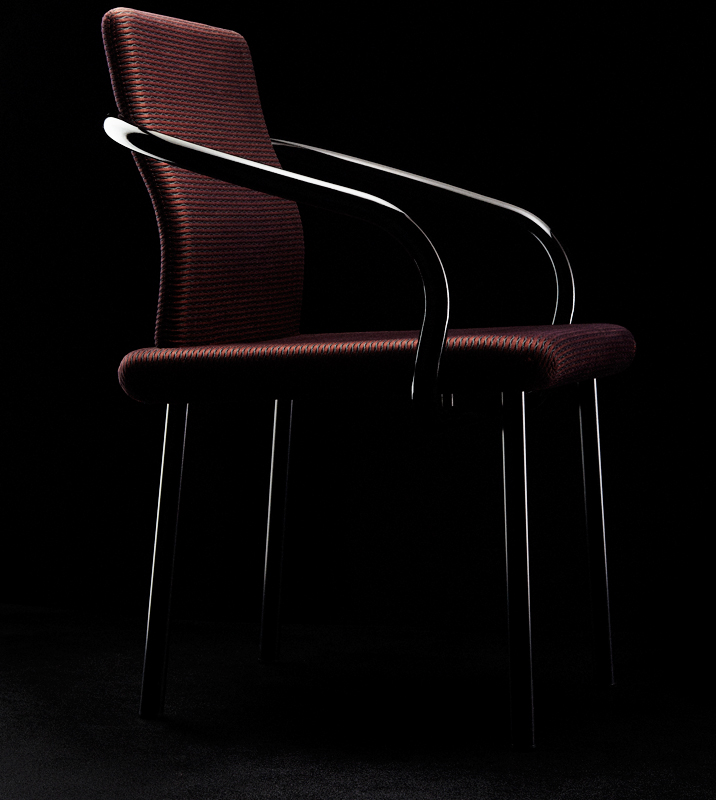
Mandarin Chair designed by Ettore Sottsass

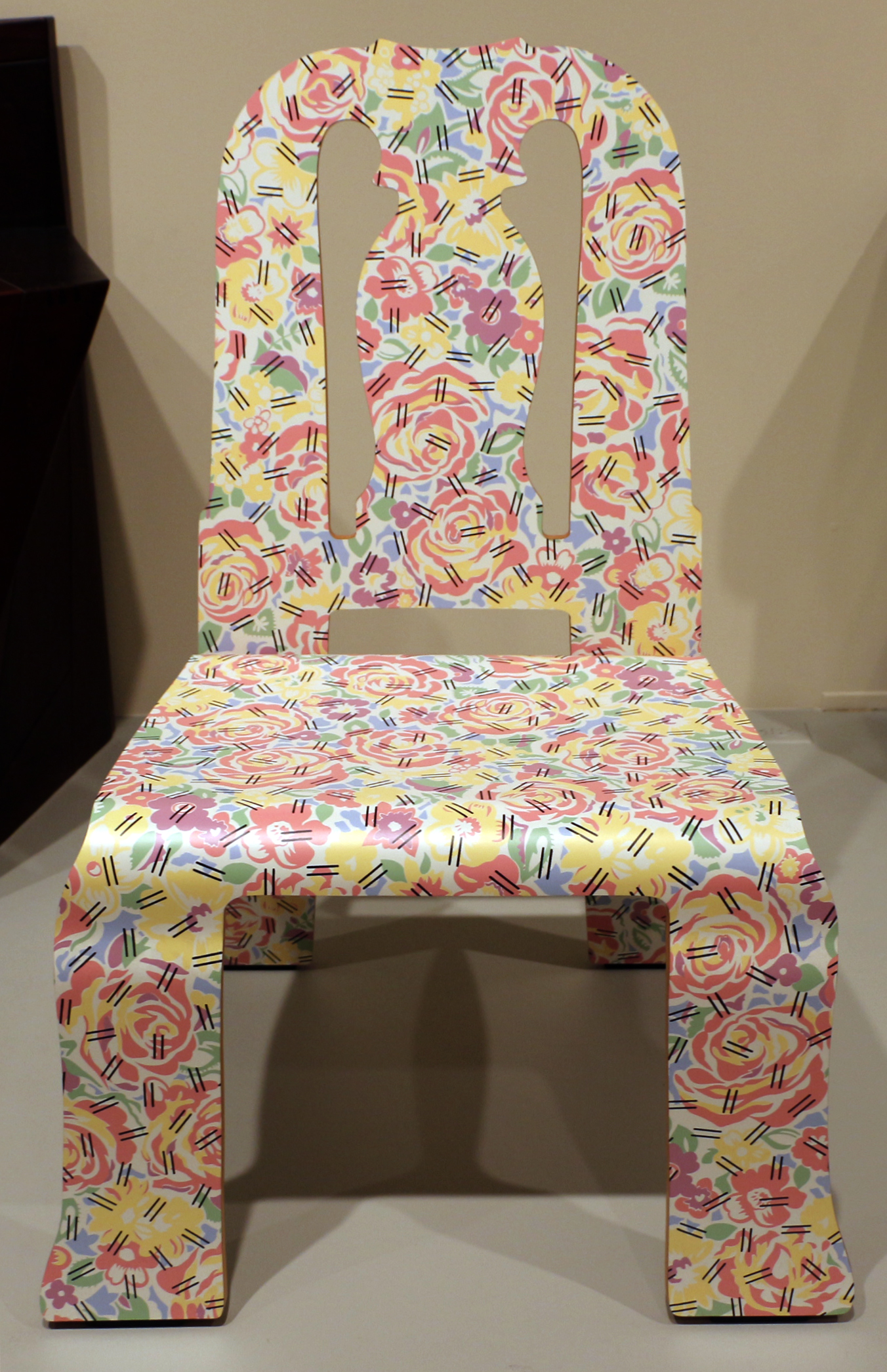
Queen Anne chair (in fantasia grandmother) Robert Venturi and Denise Scott Brown (1984)

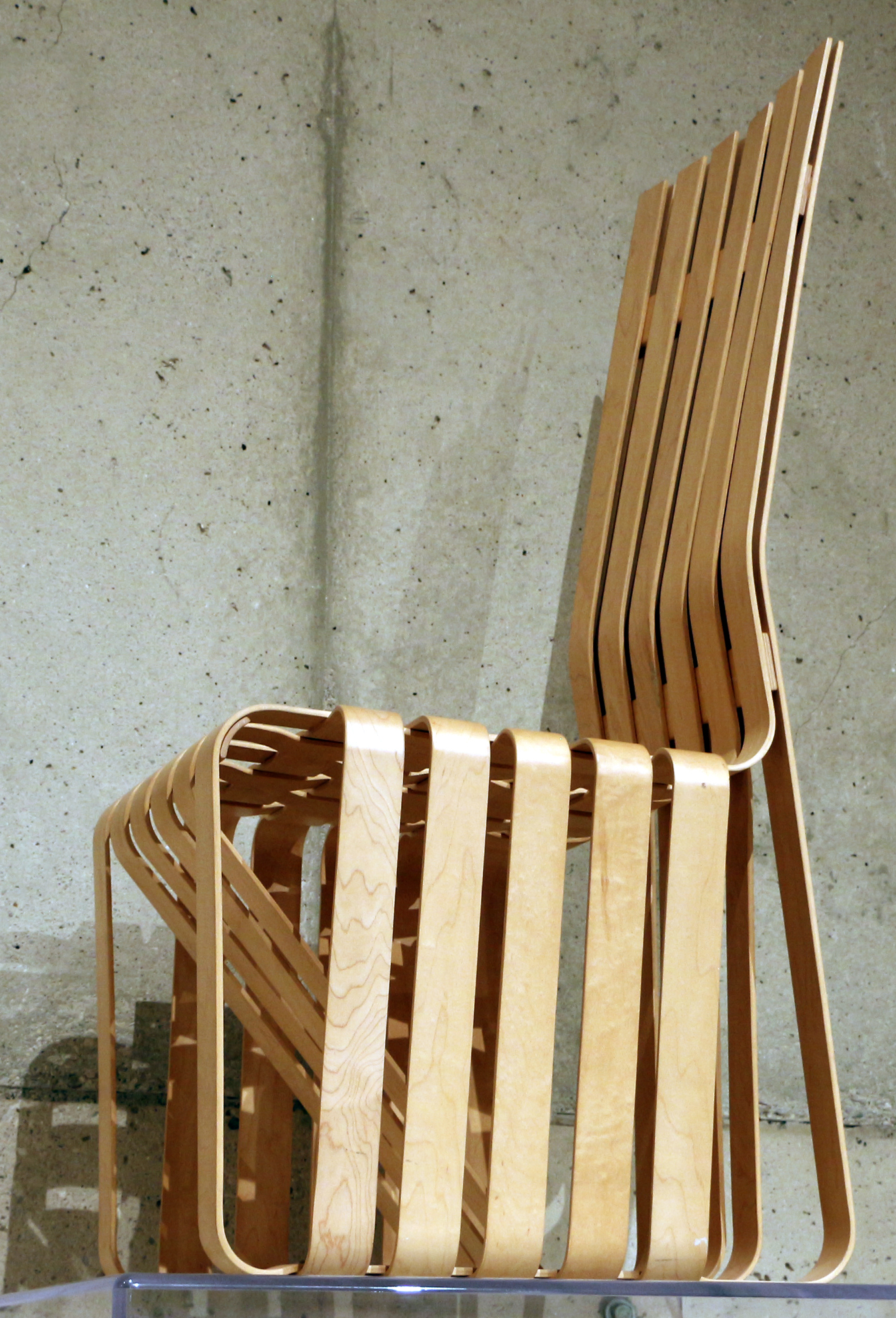
Frank Gehry high sticking, (1989–1991)

== Architecture preservation ==
Knoll sponsors exhibitions, scholarships, and other activities related to modernist architecture and design. In 2006, Knoll and the World Monuments Fund, a New York-based non-profit organization, launched Modernism at Risk, an advocacy and conservation program. Modernism at Risk encourages design solutions for at-risk modernist buildings, provides funding for conservation projects, and raises awareness of threats to Modernist architecture through exhibitions and lectures.

The World Monuments Fund (also known as the Knoll Modernism Prize) is awarded to projects that preserve Modernist architecture every two years.

In 2008, the first Knoll Modernism award was given to Winfried Brenne and Franz Jaschke of the German firm Brenne Gesellschaft von Architekten for the restoration of the former ADGB Trade Union School building on the outskirts of Berlin. The school, built between 1928 and 1930, was a project of the Bauhaus design school. Its architects were Hannes Meyer, then director of the Bauhaus, and Hans Wittwer.

The 2010 prize went to Hubert-Jan Henket and Wessel de Jonge, the founders of Docomomo International, for the restoration of Zonnestraal Sanatorium (estate) in Hilversum in the Netherlands. The 2012 prize was given to a consortium of Japanese architects and academics for the restoration of Hizuchi Elementary School, which was built in the 1950s, on Shikoku Island, Japan.

== Similar companies ==
- Global Furniture Group
- Haworth
- Herman Miller (Knoll parent company since 2021)
- Steelcase
- Vitra (furniture)
