= Hans Knoll =

German American businessman (1914–1955)

Hans G. Knoll
- Born: 1914; Stuttgart, Württemberg, Germany
- Died: 1955 (aged 40–41); Matanzas, Cuba
- Known for: Founder, Knoll (company)
- Spouse: Florence Knoll Schust
- Children: Peter Knoll Maria (Maja) Knoll.

Hans G. Knoll (1914–1955) was a German-American who, together with his wife, Florence Knoll, founded design company and furniture manufacturer Knoll.

== Biography ==
Hans Knoll was born in Stuttgart, Germany in 1914. His father, Walter C. Knoll, was a pioneer modern furniture manufacturer in pre-war Germany, who supported the Nazi regime. His mother was Maia Vollmoeller. Robert Vollmöller, a notable German industrialist, was his maternal grandfather. Hans was the second son of the family. His brother Robert traveled to America ahead of Hans in the early 1930s.

The dynasty began with his grandfather Wilhelm, who opened a leather shop in Stuttgart in 1865. Wilhelm gained prominence as an official supplier to the royal house of Württemberg, specializing in high-quality leather goods. The business was taken over by Walter and his brother William in 1907.

Before moving to the United States, Hans' experiences included working for the Jantzen Knitting Mills in Brentford, England from 1933 to 1935 and for Plan Ltd. 1935 to 1938. These companies had ties to his father's firm. Plan Ltd. provided Knoll with his first exposure to a company that exclusively focused on modern designer furniture.

Perhaps because of his father's views, or perhaps because he wanted to follow many other German modernists who had emigrated, Knoll left Germany in 1936, and first moved to England. In 1938, he moved to New York City to found a furniture manufacturing company of his own. By 1941, he had paired with furniture designer Jens Risom to launch the Hans Knoll Furniture Company. “Without knowing it, he was looking for me and I was looking for him,” Mr. Risom told Wallpaper magazine in 2008. “He wanted to get into manufacturing quality furniture.” Risom designed 15 of the 20 pieces of furniture in the Hans Knoll Furniture Company's "600" line, which began production in 1941.

In 1943, Knoll was approached by Florence Schust, an architect who had studied under Ludwig Mies van der Rohe, who had previously worked with Hans' fathers company, and Eliel Saarinen. Schust convinced Knoll that she could help bring in business to his company even in America's wartime economy by expanding into interior design and working with architects. With her architectural background and design flair, she succeeded. Knoll fell in love with Schust, and in 1946 they were married. At that time, they changed the name of the company to Knoll Associates.

In 1943 Knoll assisted the war effort by helping the US Air Force construct the German Village, a simulation of German working class dwellings to be used to perfect fire-bombing techniques on German residential areas.

The Knolls determined that, although they were focused on modern design, they would also abide by the values of the Bauhaus: design excellence, technological innovation and mass production. They paid royalties to their designers based on how well the designer's furniture sold, a practice that was innovative at the time. In this way, they were able to attract the design services of Harry Bertoia and Eliel Saarinen. Knoll Associates also acquired the rights to the Barcelona chair designed by Ludwig Mies van der Rohe.

In 1945, Knoll launched its Knoll Planning Unit under Florence's direction. She also launched a textiles division in 1947.

Knoll moved the firm's headquarters to Pennsylvania in 1950, believing that he would be able to find talented craftsmen among the region's large German population.

Knoll's sales force included Irving Blum. Blum who in 1955 had just gotten out of the Air Force, met Knoll while at lunch with a friend on New York. Knoll invited him to see his showroom and then offered him a job, stating: "...work for me, and if you stay for a year then I’ll give you a bonus, and then you’re free to do whatever you like after that. But it’s a way to ground yourself.” In an interview with Peter Brant, Blum described Knoll as the driving force behind the company and once he had passed away the romance of working there was gone. Blum decided to make a change to go to California where he bought into the Ferus Gallery. In 1961 Blum met Andy Warhol and soon became Andy Warhol's dealer for the groundbreaking Campbell's Soup Can show at the Ferus Gallery in Los Angeles in 1962.

May 8, 2014, marked the centennial of Hans Knoll's birthday. Eero Saarinen, well known Knoll designer and celebrated architect wrote of his longtime collaborator and champion: "Hans Knoll has made a great and lasting contribution to the cultural world. No one man has done so much to change the interiors of our buildings." With his employees he interacted in a personal, human way. With his designers he generously offered his own creative ideas encouraging them to try new things. Saarinen went on to say that Knoll "always freely gave credit to his designers, yet he – who played a big part in their work – never took any credit himself."

Knoll had his Porsche sent to Cuba for a business trip, and died in Matanzas in a car crash with a runaway truck in 1955 at the age of 41. He was survived by his widow Florence who became president of their company and his two children from an earlier marriage, Peter Knoll and Maria (Maja) Knoll.
