= Suzanne Tick =

American textile designer

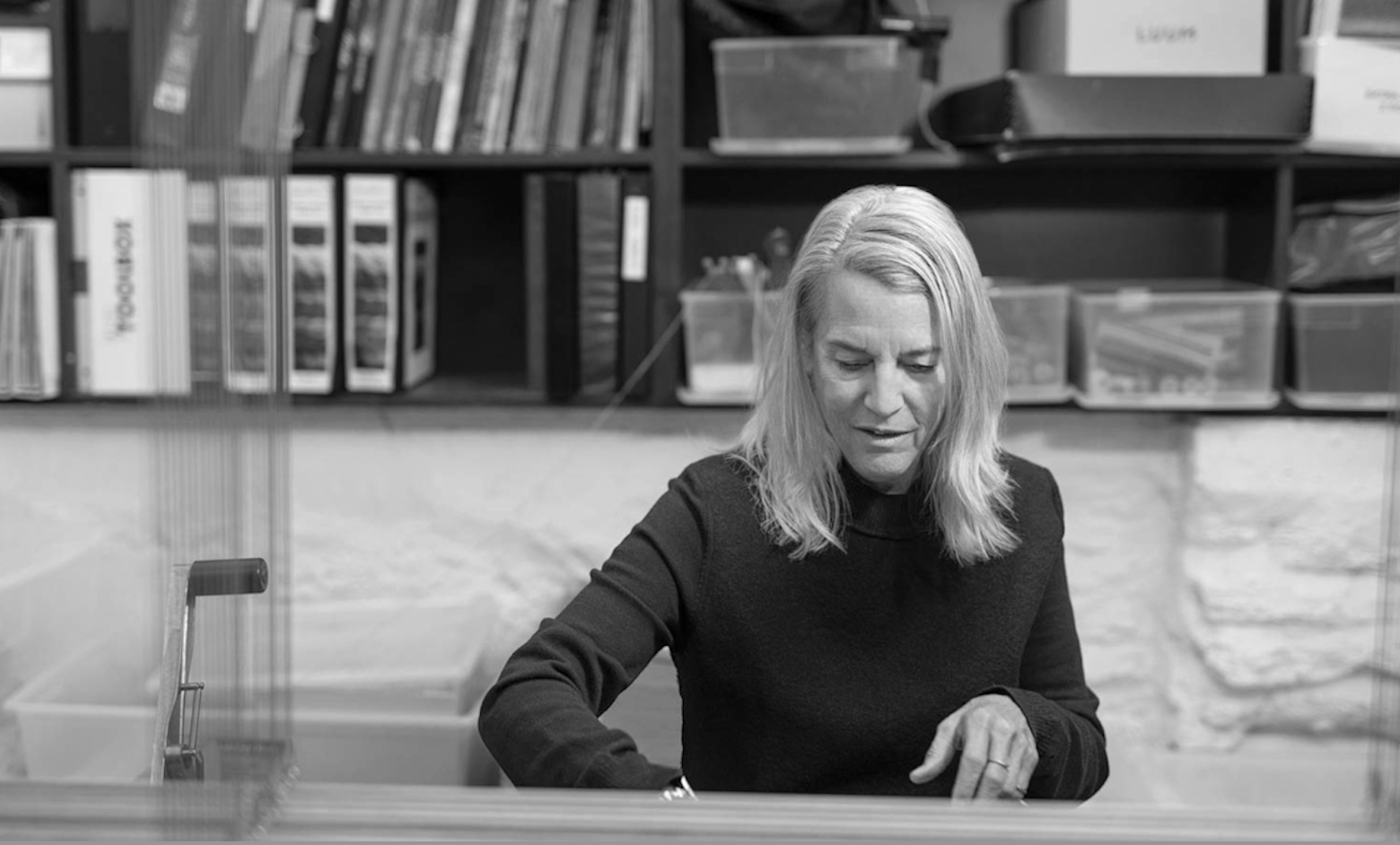
- Born: 1959 (age 66–67); Bloomington, Illinois
- Education: Fashion Institute of Technology; University of Iowa
- Website: suzannetick.com

Suzanne Tick (born 1959) is an American textile artist and designer. She is recognized for her recycled textiles and low-waste designs in woven and 3D knitted fabric. She has developed glass, floor coverings, upholstery, and wallpaper products for the architecture and interiors industry. Her work is informed by nature, technology, craft, and human ingenuity. Tick is based in New York City.

== Early life and education ==
Suzanne Tick was born in Bloomington, Illinois in 1959. Her father was a third-generation recycler and ran The Morris Tick Co. "There was no question that was my trajectory," she has said. "There was always clay. I had a welder by the time I was 12."

She received a Bachelor of Fine Arts at the University of Iowa and an Associate Degree from the Fashion Institute of Technology.

== Career ==
Suzanne Tick began her career working with American textile designer Boris Kroll. Tick was the design director for textile brands such as Gieger (formerly Brickel) and Unika Vaev. In 1995, Tick co-founded the Tuva Looms company. In 1997, she founded Suzanne Tick Inc, a commercial textile design firm and personal weaving studio in East Village, Manhattan.

She was creative director at KnollTextiles (1996–2005) and a contributing designer (2005–2010). She developed post-consumer fiber fabrics and the first solution-dyed textile. In collaboration with aerospace engineer Ray Goodson, Tick co-developed Imago, a resin-infused textile panel that embedded woven fabrics into PET translucent plastic.

Tick served as the creative director at Luum Textiles (2012–2024). She introduced biodegradable fibers into commercial fabrics. As a partner of Skyline Design, she designed several etched-glass collections. She was also the design director at Tarkett for commercial flooring and carpeting (2005–2024).

Tick's work has appeared as part of exhibitions and festivals around the world. She has received awards including the IIDA Titan Award (2013). She was named an Honorary Fellow of the American Society of Interior Designers in 2022 and was inducted into Interior Design's Hall of Fame in 2023. Her work is part of museum collections including the Museum of Modern Art, Cooper Hewitt Smithsonian Design Museum, Museum of Arts and Design.

Suzanne Tick retired from commercial work in 2024. In her art practice, she continues to weave with discarded materials. She also teaches Vedic meditation.

== Art practice ==
Tick's work emphasizes the transformation of materials. In her artwork, Tick turns discarded materials into large-scale woven sculptures and conceptual textile installations that address memory, ritual, spirituality, and environmentalism.

"Whether designing textiles or creating art, she begins with raw matter and builds from the fiber level up, believing the more you touch and work with a material, the more life and longevity the final piece gains." She builds architectural structures into textile and incorporates found and recycled materials...like dry cleaning hangers, mylar balloons, neon fiber, and fiber optics.

"Weaving holds everything together, materials and life, successes and failures," she has said. She is currently represented by East Hampton, New York gallery Onna House. She was previously represented by Cristina Grajales Gallery.

== Exhibitions ==
- Threads of Power, BravinLee Projects, New York, NY, 2023
- Textile Design Now, Centre du Design, Montreal, Canada, 2023
- Textile Month, Textile Month NYC, New York, NY, 2020
- Venice Design, Venice Biennale, Venice, Italy, 2019
- Material Meaning, Craft in America, Los Angeles, CA, 2019
- Design Miami/Basel, Cristina Grajales Gallery, Basel, Switzerland, 2012
- Design Life Now, Cooper-Hewitt National Design Museum Triennial, New York, NY, 2006

== Awards ==
- Interior Design Hall of Fame, 2023
- Best of Year Award, Interior Design Magazine, 2023
- ASID Honorary Fellow, 2022
- IIDA Titan Award, 2013
- MetropolisLikes NeoCon Award, 2017
