= Bruce Hannah (designer) =

American industrial designer (1941–2026)

- Hannah in 2025
- Born: 1941
- Died: 23 October 2026 (aged 84–85)
- Education: Pratt Institute
- Occupations: Furniture designer, industrial designer, university teacher
- Employer: Pratt Institute
- Website: brucehannahdesign.com

Bruce Hannah (1941 – October 23, 2026) was an American industrial designer and design educator.

== Early life and education ==
Hannah was born in 1941 and graduated from Pratt Institute in 1963.

== Career ==
Hannah worked for Knoll in the early 1970s together with Andrew Morrison (1939–2021), who has been described as Hannah's philosophical and creative partner. He subsequently established an independent design consultancy in 1976. Amongst many other projects from this period, he designed the Hannah Desk System for Knoll. In 1990, the project was selected as “Design of the Decade” by the Industrial Designers Society of America. He later collaborated with the designer and fellow Pratt alumna Ayse Birsel on a line of office accessories which Knoll launched in 1990 under the name KnollExtra. A chair design by Hanna and Morrison was revised and re-issued by Knoll in 2024, more than 50 years years after its initial release—which Hannah observed made it over half-way to being an antique.

In 1991, Hannah was the first designer-in-residence at the Cooper-Hewitt Museum in New York, giving tours and explaining to schoolchildren how "everything that is made by people is designed." In 1999, Hannah and George Covington curated an exhibition titled Unlimited by Design at the Cooper-Hewitt. Hannah's curatorial argument was that rather than being for "35-year-old millionaires", design "should be accessible to people of many different ages, levels of strength and agility, and degrees of affluence".

Hannah taught at Pratt Institute in Brooklyn for over 50 years, eventually becoming chair of the industrial design department. A popular class he taught was called “Fishing for Ideas”, which sought to explore design concepts and creative practice in unusual settings such as fishing trips with his students—in keeping with his belief that "to be creative, you have to find ways to stop thinking about the thing you're thinking about." He retired in 2015 and was subsequently named Professor Emeritus.

His work has been exhibited and is held in museums such as the National Design Museum (Cooper-Hewitt) and the Museum of Modern Art.

== Recognition and legacy ==
Hannah received a National Design Education Award from the Industrial Designers Society of America in 1998, a National Endowment for the Arts Presidential Design Achievement Award in 2000, and a Rowena Reed Kostellow Award in 2003.

Hannah died on October 23, 2026.

== Publications ==
- Covington, George A.; Hannah, Bruce (October 9, 1996). Access by Design: A Review of Universal Products. New York: Van Nostrand Reinhold. ISBN 978-0-471-28726-1.
- Hannah, Bruce (2003). Becoming a Product Designer: A Guide to Careers in Design. New York: John Wiley & Sons. ISBN 978-0-471-22353-5.
- Hannah, Bruce (June 2, 2017). Design Is a Performing Art. ISBN 978-1-389-98673-4.
