= Gerald Abramovitz =

South African architect and designer (1928–2011)

- Born: Gerald Abramovitz; 5 November 1928; South Africa
- Died: 16 June 2011 (aged 82); New York City, New York, U.S.
- Education: University of Pretoria
- Occupations: Architect and furniture designer

Gerald Abramovitz (5 November 1928 – 16 June 2011) was a South African architect and furniture designer.

== Biography ==
Abramovitz was born in Pretoria, the eldest son of Samson Abramovitz; Gerald had two younger half-brothers, Arnold and Oscar, a photographer. He studied architecture at the University of Pretoria and design at the Royal College of Art in London, where he wrote his thesis on car seating. Following graduation, he returned to South Africa, where his work included product design and architecture, then moved back to London and established a studio in South Kensington. There, he conducted his own research and developed his own prototypes.

In 1963, for the American company Knoll, Ambramovitz designed the 'Four Seasons Chair', which won second prize in the Daily Mirror's 1963 International Furniture Design Competition.

Also in 1963, Abramovitz presented a prototype of a cantilever desk lamp to the Birmingham lighting manufacturer Best & Lloyd. Abramovitz started the design of this lamp in 1961; its purpose was to produce a light source which would give local but diffused lighting wherever it was needed, and which would fit in with modern desk furniture. The lamp (model Cantilever 41555 Mark 2) is 19" x 28" and uses a 13" x 21" fluorescent tube. It is made of self-colour anodized aluminium, with a black steel base. The reflector, which can be angled to cut glare, pivots about the stem, which can itself be rotated, the lamp being secured in the selected position by two T-bars. The desk lamp can also be wall mounted either vertically or horizontally. After some rethinking by the company's design engineers, in collaboration with Abramovitz, to improve the lamp technically and to make production simpler and more economical, the lamp was launched in 1965. In 1966, it won a Duke of Edinburgh's Prize for Elegant Design, which was presented at the 1966 Design Centre Awards. The lamp is now in the permanent collection of the Museum of Modern Art in New York, and that of the Victoria and Albert Museum in London.

Abramovitz never retired. His career continued in the United States; he lived in New York's East Harlem neighbourhood and continued to design furniture, children’s play equipment, prefabricated housing parts and kitchen appliances. In June 2011, while visiting a friend at Central Park West, Abramovitz was attacked by a mugger. He developed a brain hemorrhage, spent two weeks in a coma and died on 16 June 2011, age 82. His death was ruled a homicide and, as of 2026, remains unsolved.
