= Ayse Birsel =

Turkish designer

- Born: 1964 (age 61–62); İzmir, Turkey
- Education: Middle East Technical University; Pratt Institute
- Known for: Designer; author
- Website: aysebirsel.com

Ayse Birsel (born 1964) is a Turkish industrial designer and author. She is best known for her design work with Herman Miller.

== Biography ==
Ayse Birsel was born in İzmir, Turkey. Birsel received her undergraduate degree in Industrial Design at Middle East Technical University (METU).

Birsel came to New York City in 1986 to attend Pratt Institute on a Fulbright Scholarship and graduated in 1989 with a master's degree in Design.

Birsel married Bibi Seck in 2004. They have two daughters, one son, and live in New York.

== Career ==
Birsel started her career by collaborating with Bruce Hannah and American contract furnishing company Knoll to design the Orchestra desk accessories collection.

Birsel then worked with the Japanese sanitaryware company TOTO in Tokyo designing the first American introduced washlet (a combination toilet seat and bidet). The Zoë Washlet won numerous design awards including ID Magazine's Gold Award in 1996.

Upon her return to New York in 1993, Birsel began her own product design studio, Olive 1:1. The studio evolved into a design and innovation studio called Birsel+Seck that she currently runs with partner, Bibi Seck.

In 2015 Birsel authored a book titled Design the Life You Love, with Penguin Random House. The book shares Birsel's design process to help people design their life and work respectively.

Birsel is also a frequent speaker on human-centered design, giving talks at TEDx in Cannes and Design Indaba in Cape Town.

== Works ==
- Zoë Washlet (TOTO, 1993)
- Resolve System (Herman Miller, 2009)

== Publications ==
- Birsel, Ayse (2015). Design the life you love : a step-by-step guide to building a meaningful. Berkeley. ISBN 978-1-60774-881-6. OCLC 900594548.
- Birsel, Ayse (2022). Design the long life you love : a step-by-step guide to love, purpose, well-being, and friendship (1st ed.). New York. ISBN 978-0-7624-8115-6. OCLC 1309129337.
- "Co-Designing with Older People" (PDF). SCAN Foundation. Archived from the original (PDF) on 2021-04-23.
- Birsel, Ayse (2022-09-22). "3 strategies to disrupt yourself for greater success in changing times".
