= Manuel Saez (industrial designer) =

Argentine designer

- Born: 1973 (age 52–53); Concepción, Tucumán, Argentina
- Education: National University of Tucumán; University of Bridgeport
- Occupation: Industrial designer

Manuel Saez (born 1973, Tucumán, Argentina) is an industrial designer. He graduated with Honors from the University of Bridgeport. His E-scooter company Beyond partnered with Metropolitan Transportation Authority during the pandemic. In 2016 US President Barack Obama receives his designed CMYK 4.0 model bicycle as the presidential gift from Argentina’s president Mauricio Macri. He designed bicycle, electric scooter, smart helmet, furniture and consumer goods.
