= Richard Schultz =

American furniture designer (1926–2021)

Moses Richard Schultz (September 22, 1926 – September 28, 2021) was an American furniture designer. He was responsible for several iconic and notable creations in the 1950s–1990s through his firm Richard Schultz Design, Inc..

== Biography ==
Moses Richard Schultz was born on September 22, 1926, in Lafayette, Indiana. After studying at Iowa State University and the Illinois Institute of Technology in Chicago, Schultz joined Knoll in 1951 as a designer, to work with Harry Bertoia. He initially assisted on working on the Bertoia Wire Collection at Knoll.

He taught basic design at the Philadelphia College of Art, and had a one-man show of his sculpture at the Museum of Modern Art, New York. He left Knoll in 1972 to freelance until founding Richard Schultz Designs in Palm, Pennsylvania, with his son, Peter in 1992.

Significant designs over the years include the Leisure Collection (1966), Petal Table (1960), and Wire Mesh Chaise (1963) for Knoll, and the Topiary Chair (1989) for his own company.

It was reported that as of March, 2012, Knoll bought the Richard Schultz company.

Schultz died on September 28, 2021, in Princeton, New Jersey.
