= Hans Bellmann =

Swiss architect and furniture designer (1911–1990)

- Born: 25 September 1911; Turgi, Switzerland
- Died: 26 October 1990 (aged 79); Wiggwil, Beinwil, Switzerland
- Education: Bauhaus
- Occupations: Architect, product designer
- Known for: Furniture and industrial design

Hans Bellmann (25 September 1911 – 26 October 1990) was a Swiss architect and product designer who played a major role in shaping Swiss domestic design during the 1950s and 1960s. He studied at the Bauhaus school and later worked for Ludwig Mies van der Rohe. His designs received twelve Die Gute Form awards from the Swiss Werkbund.

== Biography ==
Hans Bellmann was born on 25 September 1911 in Turgi. His father, Georg Albin Bellmann, was a galvaniser from Dresden, and his mother was Maria Katharina Eckhardt. After training as an architectural draughtsman in Baden, he studied at the Bauhaus school in Dessau and Berlin, receiving his diploma in 1933. He was the youngest student at the Dessau Bauhaus when he enrolled in 1931 and studied design under Josef Albers. Bellmann and Albers maintained a regular correspondence for many years. After completing his studies, he worked for Ludwig Mies van der Rohe.

Bellmann returned to Switzerland in 1934 and worked with Wohnbedarf AG in Zurich until 1938. From 1939 to 1945, he was employed by architectural practices in Zurich, Lugano and Bern. He later became a freelance architect and product designer.

Bellmann taught at the Kunstgewerbeschule Zürich from 1948 to 1955 and was invited by Max Bill to teach at the Hochschule für Gestaltung Ulm in 1953–54. At the Kunstgewerbeschule Zürich, he incorporated elements of Bauhaus teaching that he had learned from Albers. Further appointments followed at the Gewerbeschule Basel in 1958–59 and the University of Washington in Seattle in 1964–65. He died on 26 October 1990 in Wiggwil, in the municipality of Beinwil.

== Work ==
Bellmann played a major role in shaping Swiss domestic design during the 1950s and 1960s. His Bauhaus training and his subsequent work with van der Rohe shaped his approach to design.

As an architect and industrial designer, Bellmann designed furniture and industrial products, built single-family houses and fitted out furniture shops. His architectural work consisted mainly of small-scale houses, alongside exhibition and interior design. By the time he began teaching in Zurich, he had already become known for furniture intended for series production. His designs included the Kolonialtisch and a shelving system tensioned between the floor and ceiling. Bellmann’s Tripod Tables were sold by Wohnbedarf in Switzerland and imported by Knoll in 1948.

From 1955 to 1961, Bellmann developed the Sitwell furniture collection with Strässle Söhne AG. The collection used the first industrially manufactured polyester seat shells in Europe. His product designs included the Einpunktstuhl (a chair that can be dismantled), and the Carina washbasin. Bellmann used a single screw in the construction of the Einpunktstuhl, which received a Die Gute Form award in 1952. His designs received twelve Die Gute Form awards from the Swiss Werkbund. Bellmann placed particular emphasis on practicality and suitability for domestic use in his furniture and product designs.

Bellmann designed the GA Stuhl in 1955. The model remained in production until 1970. For its seat, he divided a moulded-plywood shell and reconnected the two sections at an angle, creating a three-dimensional form. The construction led to the GA Stuhl also being known as the "two-shell chair". The design received a Die Gute Form award in 1956. At Expo 64 in Lausanne, the Ticino restaurant was furnished with Bellmann’s GA Stuhl.
