= Florence Knoll =

American architect (1917–2019)

- Born: Florence Schust; May 24, 1917; Saginaw, Michigan, U.S.
- Died: January 25, 2019 (aged 101); Coral Gables, Florida, U.S.
- Education: Kingswood School (Cranbrook for girls); Cranbrook Academy of Art (architecture school); Columbia University; Architectural Association School of Architecture; Illinois Institute of Technology
- Occupation: Designer
- Organization: Knoll, Inc.
- Known for: Modernizing interior design for offices and workplaces
- Style: Modernism
- Spouses: Hans Knoll, 1946–1955; Harry Hood Bassett, 1958–1991
- Awards: National Medal of Arts, 2003

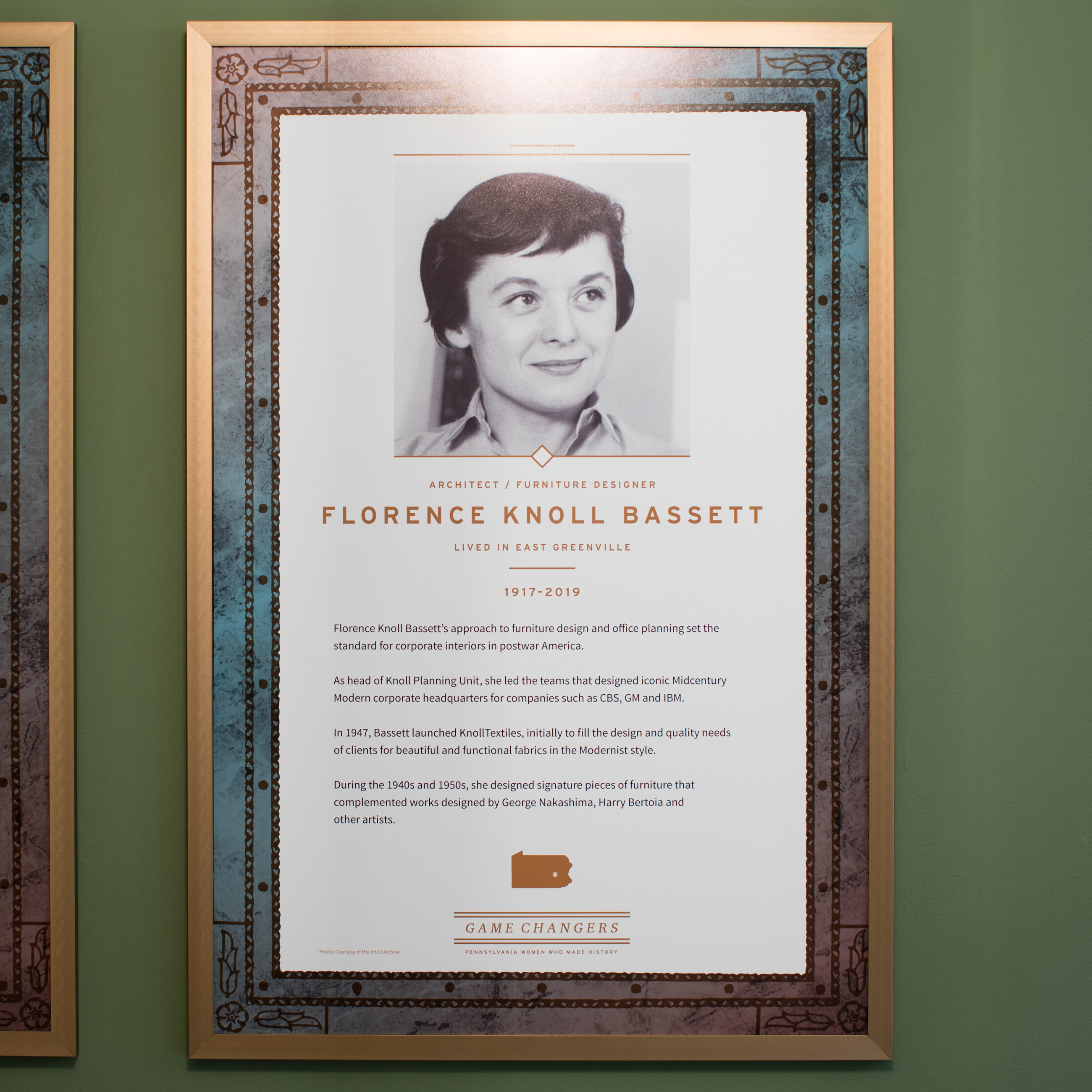
Florence Knoll Basset pictured in the Game Changers: Pennsylvania Women Who Made History exhibition at the Pennsylvania Governor's Mansion (2019)

Florence Marguerite Knoll Bassett (née Schust; May 24, 1917 – January 25, 2019) was an American architect, interior designer, furniture designer, and entrepreneur who has been credited with revolutionizing office design and bringing modernist design to office interiors. Knoll and her husband, Hans Knoll, built Knoll Associates into a leader in the fields of furniture and interior design. She worked to professionalize the field of interior design, fighting against gendered stereotypes of the decorator. She is known for her open office designs, populated with modernist furniture and organized rationally for the needs of office workers. Her modernist aesthetic was known for clean lines and clear geometries that were humanized with textures, organic shapes, and color.

== Early life and education ==
Florence Marguerite Schust was born in Saginaw, Michigan, to Frederick Emanuel (1881–1923) and Mina Matilda (Haist) Schust (1884–1931), and was known in familiar circles as "Shu". Frederick Schust was born about 1882 in either Switzerland or Germany and was a native German speaker. The 1920 United States Federal Census describes him as the superintendent of a commercial bakery. Mina was born about 1887 in Michigan, and her parents had been born in Canada. Florence was orphaned at a young age; her father died when she was 5, and her mother died when she was 12. She was placed under the care of Emile Tessin, who had been designated by Mina Schust as Florence's legal guardian in the event of her death. Tessin made arrangements for Florence to attend boarding school. After visiting, she recalled feeling that the Cranbrook educational community was the right place for her.

Between 1932 and 1934, Florence attended Kingswood School Cranbrook, a girls' school at the Cranbrook Educational Community in Bloomfield Hills, Michigan. There she was mentored by Rachel de Wolfe Raseman, the art director at Kingswood. Together they designed a home which integrated interior and exterior, sparking her interest in architecture and bringing her to the attention of Eliel Saarinen, the Cranbrook Academy of Art President. Eliel and Loja Saarinen practically adopted Florence; she spent summers with the family in Finland and befriended their son, Eero Saarinen who even gave her impromptu architectural history lessons. She attended the architecture department at Cranbrook Academy of Art for one year in 1934–35, In 1935, she studied town planning at the School of Architecture at Columbia University. She returned to Michigan in 1936 to undergo surgery and enrolled in the architecture department at Cranbrook again. In 1936–37, she explored furniture-making with Eero Saarinen and Charles Eames. In the summer of 1938 she met Alvar Aalto, who praised Architectural Association in London as a "terrific school," Florence Schust went on to attend it in 1938–1939. There she enjoyed the focus on studio work and was influenced by Le Corbusier's International style. She left as World War II was spreading.

In 1940-1941, Florence Schust furthered her architectural educations under leading figures of the Bauhaus movement. In 1940, she moved to Cambridge, Massachusetts, and worked briefly as an unpaid apprentice for Walter Gropius and Marcel Breuer. Though her studies had been repeatedly interrupted by ill health and international events, Florence was determined to finish her degree. She enrolled at the Chicago Armour Institute (now the Illinois Institute of Technology) in fall 1940. She went to specifically study under Mies van der Rohe and received a bachelor's degree in architecture in 1941. Knoll's design approach was profoundly influenced by Mies, resulting in clarified designs with rigorous geometries.

== Career ==
After graduating, Florence Schust moved to New York in 1941, taking jobs with several New York architects, including Harrison & Abramovitz. "Being a woman, I was given interiors," Florence Schust stated about her time at Harrison & Abramovitz. While there, she worked with Hans Knoll to design an office for Harry Stimson. Afterwards she continued the partnership, moonlighting as a designer for the Hans G. Knoll Furniture Company, which included designing their showroom. In 1943, she joined the Hans Knoll's company and founded their interior design service, the Knoll Planning Unit. She and Hans Knoll were married in 1946, when she became a full business partner and the company became known Knoll Associates, Inc.

=== Knoll Associates ===
The pairing led to success as Florence helped Hans Knoll turn what was a small furniture company into an international powerhouse. Florence Knoll was the design force and Hans Knoll was entrepreneurial and charismatic. A new furniture factory was established in East Greenville, Pennsylvania, and dealers of Knoll's furniture were carefully added over the next several years. Knoll Showrooms and retailers expanded internationally, by 1960 the company was doing $15 million of business annually. The Knoll showrooms embodied their humanized modern designs, showing customers how to use their new furniture. Their first showroom was opened in 1948 in New York City followed by those in Dallas, Chicago, San Francisco, Paris, Los Angeles, Southfield, Michigan and other cities. The company expanded internationally forming Knoll International in 1951, as well as moved into textiles, forming Knoll Textiles.

Knoll felt architects should contribute their design ability to furniture as well, and she brought her international connections, designer friends, and even her former teachers to Knoll. She managed to get architects including Eero Saarinen, Marcel Breuer, Pierre Jeanneret and Hans Bellman to design furniture for Knoll. Famously, Knoll asked Saarinen to design a chair that was "like a great big basket of pillows that I can curl up in," resulting in his classic Womb chair. Knoll and Saarinen had to work with a fiberglass boat builder in order to manufacture the chair. Knoll persuaded her former teacher, Mies van der Rohe, to give Knoll the rights to the Barcelona Chair which he had designed with Lilly Reich in 1929. Knoll also tapped artists to create furniture, such as Isamu Noguchi, whose cyclone table (1950) became a Knoll replica. Knoll had the sculptor, Harry Bertoia spend two years in his studio to see if he could translate his metal work into furniture resulting in his well known wire chairs. She managed to attract Knoll's considerable stable of designer talent by paying commissions and royalties and ensuring credit for designs.

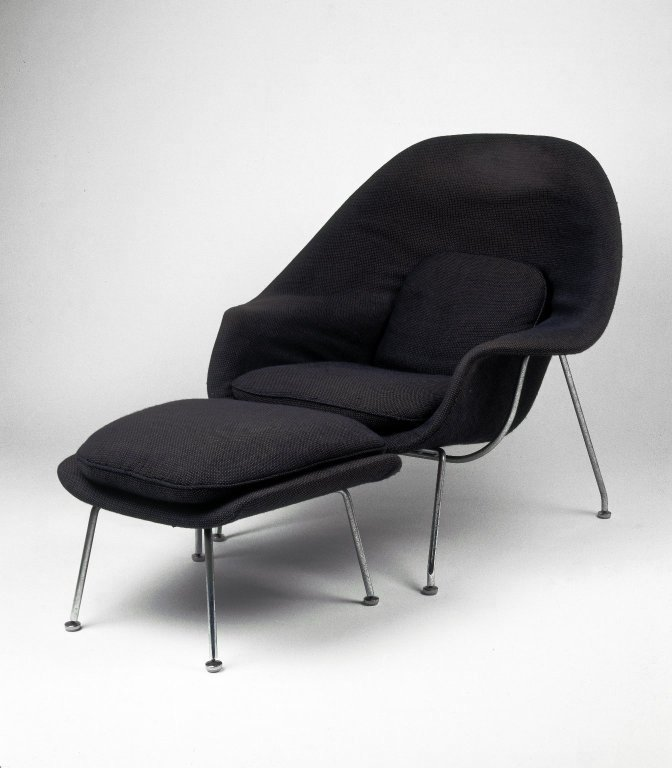
Eero Saarinen's Womb Chair was designed in 1947-1948 at the request of Florence Knoll.

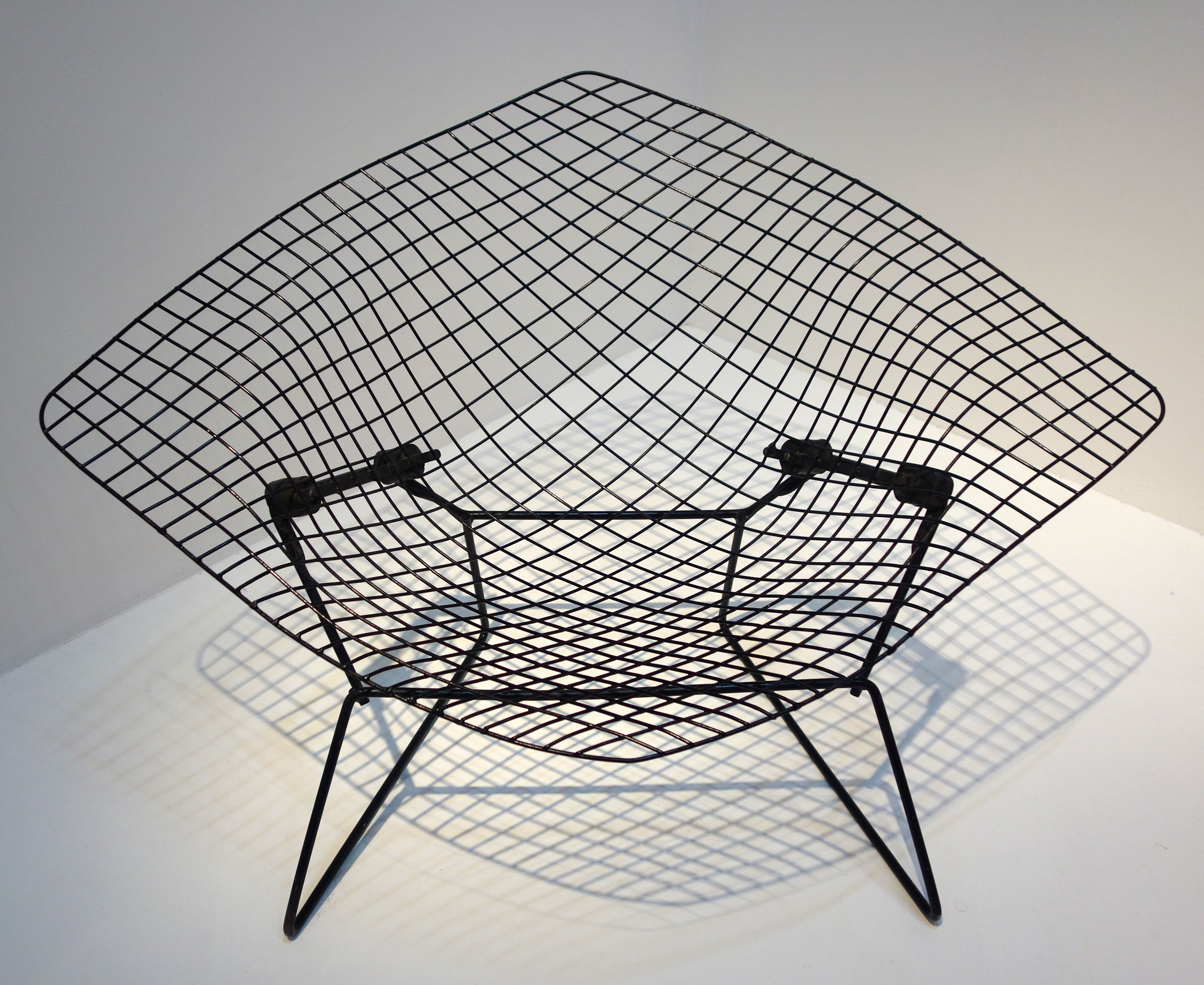
Knoll had Bertoia translate his sculptural work into furniture, resulting in his wire chairs.

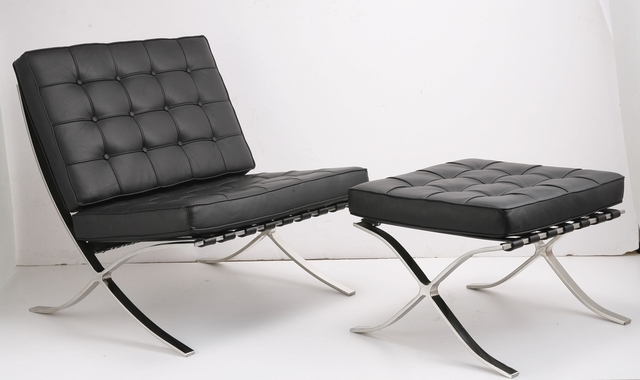
Mies van der Rohe formally granted Knoll the production rights to the Barcelona Chair and Stool in 1953.

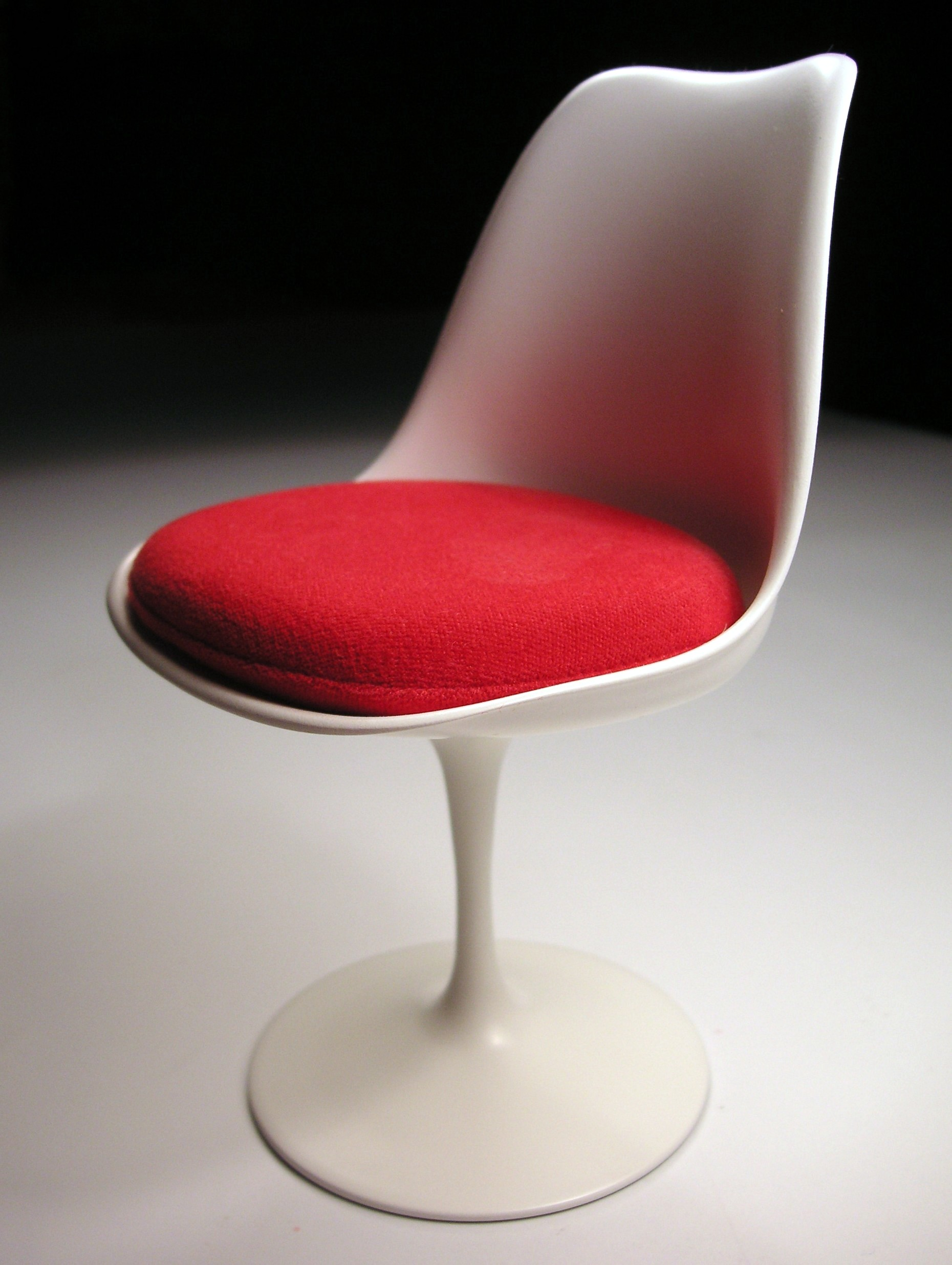
In 1956, Knoll introduced Eero Saarinen's tulip chairs and pedestal table.

When Hans Knoll prematurely died in a car accident on the island of Cuba in 1955, Florence Knoll took over as president of all three Knoll companies (Knoll Associates, Knoll Textiles, and Knoll International). She sold the companies to Art Metal Construction Company in 1959, though she continued on as president of all three companies until 1960. In 1960, she moved to Florida with her second husband, Harry Hood Bassett. However, she stayed in charge of design for all of Knoll until 1965. In the ten years since she had taken primary responsibility for Knoll, she had doubled the size of the company to become one of the most influential design businesses in the world.

=== Knoll Planning Unit ===
Florence Knoll created the interior design service of Knoll Associates (The Knoll Planning Unit) in 1943 and directed its activities until 1965; the unit closed down 1971. The Planning Unit at first designed Knoll Showrooms, arranging furniture and accessories to showcase the firm's designs and demonstrate how to use the furniture, Knoll Showrooms became an essential part in convincing clients to adopt Knoll's modernist aesthetic. During the post-war period, the United States experienced an office building boom, and the Knoll Planning Unit was well positioned to take advantage as it began offering innovative full-service design solutions for office interiors including everything from space planning to furniture selection. Knoll also advanced the science of office design, not just decorating the space, but analyzing the client's work requirements and designing functional spaces that would meet these needs. Knoll conducted interviews to identify clients' work needs through interviews. The Unit completed over 70 office interiors, including the offices of major American companies such as IBM, GM, Look magazine, Seagram, Heinz, Connecticut General Life Insurance Company, and CBS. The Unit's breakthrough came from designing for the CBS president, Frank Stanton, who had been impressed by the Knoll Showrooms. Stanton promoted Knoll design to his contacts, and Knoll shrewdly promoted their work for CBS through architecture and design magazines. The Planning Unit typically ran on a very small team, typically only 8 designers and 2 drafters on staff, and even as the volume of projects dramatically increased, the staff only grew to around 20 employees. Knoll provided extensive education and mentoring to the designers that worked under her, and many of the Knoll Planning Unit designers went on to found interior divisions at architectural firms such as SOM. The preparation and training of interior designers earned the Planning Unit the moniker "Shu U" after Knoll's nickname.

=== The Knoll look ===
Knoll and her Knoll Planning Unit have been credited with revolutionizing office design and environments, replacing antique styles and haphazard arrangements with the signature "Knoll Look," marked by rationalized space plans, modern furniture, sleek geometries, and an integration of structure, color, and texture. In the 1940s office decoration had been dominated by antique and period styles. Offices typically had traditional, heavy, carved, mahogany desks placed diagonally in the corner of a room, another diagonal table behind it, chairs scattered, and a glassed-in bookcase. Knoll replaced the old executive desk with light and sleek modern designs, as well as straightening its diagonal positioning. Work spaces were made to be more open with sitting areas for informal discussion. She redesigned conference tables into a boat-shape so that people could see one another to accommodate group discussions. She often employed floating open-riser staircases and multilevel interiors, drawing on her architectural background.

Knoll radically transformed interior space planning creating a "total design" or "Bauhaus approach" where interior architecture, furniture, lighting, textiles, and art were integrated. The unit created some of the most innovative design for office interiors during the post-war period, largely due to Knoll's design aesthetic of humanized modernism, in which Knoll brought color and texture to interiors inspired by modernism, making them more comfortable for everyday use. This "softer modernism" with color and organic shapes, which was also practiced by Charles and Ray Eames as well as Eero Saarinen, was more appealing to a general public. Knoll brought in architecture, ergonomics, efficiency, and space planning to her comprehensive interior designs. The NY Times critic, Paul Goldberger, said she “probably did more than any other single figure to create the modern, sleek, postwar American office, introducing contemporary furniture and a sense of open planning into the work environment.” In 1957, Architectural Forum said "the Knoll interior is as much a symbol of modern architecture as Tiffany glass was a symbol of the architecture of Art Nouveau."

=== Selling modernism ===
Florence Knoll Paste-up

One of Knoll's main challenges was convincing executives and the public to adopt a modernist aesthetic. Knoll Showrooms played a key role in selling the public on modernist design, but Knoll was also gifted at convincing executives to hire Knoll to transform their offices. Knoll was renowned for how she communicated and presented the designs of the Knoll Planning Unit through what she referred to as "paste-ups". A "paste-up" was a general graphic-arts term for any draft or finished mechanical flat art, traditionally using an adhesive commonly used in fashion and set design. Knoll was the first to use the method for interior design presentation. Her paste-ups were small representational plans of the space with fabric swatches, wood chips and finishes attached to represent furniture and other details. Knoll used the paste-ups to convey the feeling and experience of the space, in the pictured example the color and texture of the materials used better represented the humanized modernism that was essential to Knoll's designs. The paste-ups were essential in overcoming resistance to change, they gave executives something they could identify with, making them feel comfortable in adopting Knoll's new aesthetics.

=== Furniture design ===
Knoll designed furniture when the existing pieces in the Knoll collection didn't meet her needs. She described her pieces as the "meat and potatoes," the filler among the flashier pieces in the Knoll collection. Knoll stated that she was not a furniture designer, perhaps because she didn't want her furniture pieces to be viewed on their own but rather as an element of her holistic interior design. Nonetheless, almost half of the furniture pieces in the Knoll collection were her designs including tables, desks, chairs, sofas, benches and stools.

She designed furniture not only to be functional but also to designate the functions of interior space as well as relate to the architecture of the space and its overall composition. The distinctive features of Knoll's furniture designs were their sleek silhouettes and clear geometries, reflecting her architectural training and interests. Her furniture was designed with the notion of transforming architecture into furniture, which she achieved by translating the structure and language of the modern building into a human-scaled object.

== Professionalization of interior design ==
Before Knoll's influence, interior decoration was mostly a non-professional pursuit, typically practiced by hobbyists. It had previously only been applied to the home; spaces like offices were not typically professionally planned or designed. Knoll saw an opportunity to change that:

In those days the boss usually had a decorator. They did his office and maybe some of the other senior executives, but the people further down the line had offices designed by the purchasing agent, who ordered furniture out of a catalog. So when I came along with my questionnaire, I wanted to know what they needed. It was kind of a radical ideal, but it was also logical and obvious.

With her Knoll Planning Unit, Knoll radically shifted interior design to be a professional endeavor. Knoll fused decoration with architecture and industrial design and applied it to commercial office space, this fusion has continued to be at the core of modern professional interior design. Knoll was aware of the shift she was creating; in an interview with the New York Times in 1964, Knoll stated, "I am not a decorator... the only place I decorate is my own house." She was frustrated at the title of "interior decorator", especially in its gendered connotation and concomitant lack of status and respect, and was one of the first to differentiate the titles "interior decorator" and "interior designer". She felt that expertise in furniture design and architecture exceed the common skill of an interior decorator.

== Awards ==
Florence Knoll received many awards and honors in her lifetime, including the Museum of Modern Art's Good Design Award (1950, 1953), the first award from the American Institute of Decorators (1954), and became the first woman to receive the Gold Medal for Industrial Design from the American Institute of Architects (1961). She went on to earn the International Design Award from the American Institute of Interior Designers (1962), the Total Design Award from the American Society of Interior Designers (1977), and the RISD Athena Award for Creativity and Excellence (1983). In 1985 she was inducted into the Interior Design Hall of Fame and in 2002 President George W. Bush presented her with the nation's highest award for artistic excellence, the National Medal of Arts. She also was awarded honorary doctoral degrees from the University of Vermont (2004), the University of Miami (1995), and the University of Minnesota (2008).

== Personal life ==
She married Hans Knoll in 1946; he died in a car crash in 1955. In 1958 she married Harry Hood Bassett, the son of Harry H. Bassett. On January 25, 2019, Florence Marguerite Knoll Bassett died at age 101 in Coral Gables, Florida.

Florence leaves behind two stepsons, Harry Jr. and Patrick Bassett; a stepdaughter, Maia Marcq, whose father was Hans Knoll; and nine grandchildren. George Bassett, a third stepson, died in 2008.
