= Alexandra Cunningham Cameron =

American curator of contemporary design

Alexandra Cunningham Cameron is an American curator of contemporary design and the first Hintz Secretarial Scholar at Cooper Hewitt, Smithsonian Design Museum.

== Career ==
Cameron is currently design of director at the Judd Foundation. Previously she hedl the role of curator of contemporary design and inaugural Edward and Helen Hintz Secretarial Scholar at Cooper Hewitt, Smithsonian Design Museum.

Upon joining the museum in 2018, she initiated the critically acclaimed first retrospective of African-American fashion designer Willi Smith, edited the publication, Willi Smith: Street Couture (Rizzoli Electa, 2020) and developed the Willi Smith Digital Community Archive, a prototype for crowdsourced archiving, with website developers Cargo. She organized the exhibition Duro Olowu Selects Works from the Permanent Collection and is a curator of the 2024 Smithsonian Design Triennial.

Cameron has curated architecture and design exhibitions at museums around the United States including Meeting the Clouds Halfway with Tohono O'Odham basket weaver Terrol Dew Johnson and Aranda\Lasch at the Museum of Contemporary Art Tucson, Free Play at Museum of Contemporary Art Santa Barbara, and Yona Friedman: Space Chain Phantasy at the Institute of Contemporary Art Miami. She has also organized large-scale and public works and performances with Ronan and Erwan Bouroullec, Philippe Malouin, Urs Fischer, Jamian Juliano-Villani, Dozie Kanu, Thom Browne, Fernando Laposse, Harvard Graduate School of Design Asif Khan, Charlap Hyman and Herrero, levenbetts, Snarkitecture and Jamilah Sabur. She sits on the Executive Board of the Fondation D'entreprise Martell, established to present cross-disciplinary exhibitions and host residencies for artists, designers and chefs in Cognac, France and is involved in the International Library of Fashion Research at the Norwegian National Museum.

In 2019, Cameron Co-curated with Gean Moreno the first public project of Yona Friedman in the United States. Friedman was 96 years old at the time. A Hungarian-born French architect, urban planner, and designer, Friedman brought attention to informal architecture and the collaboration between professional architects and communities from the 1950s until his death in 2020. Much of his work was derived from his experience as a refugee.

Cameron began her career with the Design Miami fairs in 2007. She stepped down as Creative Director in 2015. In 2011, she initiated a series of commissions at the fair with young US-based architects, including Moorhead and Moorhead, Formlessfinder, Snarkitecture, and Jonathan Muecke.

From 2016–2018, Cameron was the editor in chief of The Miami Rail, an independent arts journal and sister paper of The Brooklyn Rail that produced critical coverage of art, architecture, politics, film, and literature from the perspective of Miami as an axis of the United States, Caribbean, and Latin America. While editing the paper, Cameron initiated a writers' residency program for women writers including Alison Gingeras, Alissa Nutting, and Emily Raboteau. Cameron described the mission of the paper as critical. Criticism "is not a tool or a diversion. It is a fundamental, irreducible, absolute, and essential approach to art and the world. Miami is not just a place. Miami is a crisis." The issues published under Cameron expanded the focus of the magazine, hiring Patricia Engel as literary editor.

== Personal life ==
Cameron was born on Miami Beach, Florida. She has worked in both Miami and New York. She is married to the artist Seth Cameron, a founding member of the Bruce High Quality Foundation and former Director of the Children's Museum of the Arts. They have two sons. Cameron’s career in the design field and collection of art and design, which includes the work of emerging and established designers and artists such as Philippe Malouin, Katie Stout, Maarten Baas, Max Lamb, Betty Tompkins, Ron Gorchov, Jim Brittingham and Nicola L. has been featured in publications such as The New York Times, Architectural Digests in the United States, Germany and Spain.

== Publications ==
- Tools and Approaches for Transforming Museum Experience, Shanita Brackett, Isabella Bruno, Kayleigh Bryant-Greenwell, Alexandra Cunningham-Cameron, Silvia Filippini-Fantoni, Rachel Ginsberg, Andrea Jones, Adam Martin, Katherine Miller, Liz Neely, Carolyn Royston, Casey Scott-Songin, Dr. Lauren Vargas, Cooper Hewitt, Smithsonian Design Museum, 2021.
- Willi Smith: Street Couture, Cunningham Cameron, Alexandra, ed., Cooper Hewitt, Smithsonian Design Museum and Rizzoli Electa, 2020.
- Cunningham Cameron, Alexandra, An Ode to One of Streetwear’s Forgotten Founders, The Financial Times, March 6, 2020.
- The Miami Rail, "Issue 20–23," Ed. Cunningham Cameron, Alexandra, Spring 2017–2018.

== See also ==
- Martine Syms
- Scott Burton
- Dozie Kanu
