= Emily Oberg =

Canadian businesswoman (born 1994)

- Born: 1994 (age 31–32); Calgary, Alberta, Canada
- Occupations: Businesswoman; fashion designer
- Years active: 2015–present
- Known for: Founder of Sporty & Rich
- Title: Founder and CEO of Sporty & Rich

Emily Oberg (born 1994) is a Canadian businesswoman and fashion designer. She is the founder and chief executive officer of the lifestyle and apparel brand Sporty & Rich.

Born in Calgary, Oberg moved to New York City in 2015 to work as an editorial producer and on-camera host at the media company Complex, and later was creative lead of the women's line at the streetwear brand Kith. She began Sporty & Rich as an Instagram mood board around 2014 and developed it into a print magazine and then an apparel brand. Based in Los Angeles and Paris, the brand is known for combining vintage 1980s and 1990s sportswear with a wellness-focused, country-club aesthetic.

== Early life and education ==
Oberg was born in 1994 in Calgary, Alberta. She began working in retail at the age of 14, and at 18 she moved to Vancouver to complete a one-year fashion program before relocating to New York City.

== Career ==
=== Complex and Kith ===
Oberg moved to New York in 2015 to join the media company Complex, where she worked as an editorial producer and on-camera host covering sneakers, streetwear and popular culture. She hosted the workout video series Get Sweaty, in which she exercised with guests including Erykah Badu and DJ Khaled. She also co-directed Sold Out: The Underground Economy of Supreme Resellers, a documentary about resellers of the brand Supreme. In February 2017 she left Complex to become creative lead of the women's line at the streetwear brand Kith, working under its founder Ronnie Fieg; she departed about a year later to concentrate on her own brand.

=== Sporty & Rich ===
Oberg started Sporty & Rich in 2014 as an Instagram account that archived vintage images of sport, supermodels and luxury, and ran it as a side project while she was at Complex; it grew into a print magazine that ran for four issues. In 2018 the project became a company when Oberg partnered with the French designer David Obadia, with whom she was then in a relationship; Obadia was chief executive and oversaw design, production and finance from Paris, while Oberg remained founder and creative director. The business was self-funded and grew without outside investment.

The brand operates a twice-monthly product "drop" model and opened its first store on July 20, 2023, a two-floor, 3,600-square-foot space at 133 Greene Street in the SoHo neighborhood of New York that had previously housed a Dior boutique and that included a café and a spa. The brand expanded to more than 200 wholesale accounts and opened flagship stores in New York, Los Angeles, Shanghai and Seoul. It launched a beauty and skincare line in 2023, and reported revenue of roughly $30 million in 2023 and an estimated $35 million to $40 million in 2025.

Sporty & Rich became known for its collaborations. In 2022 it released its first collection with Adidas Originals, reworking the Campus 80s, Samba, Stan Smith and Firebird tracksuit; a 2024 follow-up was released around the Paris Olympics in a red, white and blue palette referencing Canada, France and the United States. It also produced a tennis-themed collection with Lacoste in 2023, and collections with the hotels Le Bristol Paris and Hôtel du Cap-Eden-Roc.

In 2024 Oberg began developing Sensual Sport, a separate sexual-wellness brand offering supplements, underwear and oils. In 2025 Obadia left the company, and Oberg, who owns Sporty & Rich outright, took over its management and design and assumed the role of chief executive officer, stating an aim to grow the brand to $100 million in annual sales.

== Personal life ==
Oberg divides her time between Los Angeles and Paris, where Sporty & Rich is headquartered. She attends the French Open tennis tournament each year.
