= Adidas Handball Spezial =

Line of shoes by Adidas

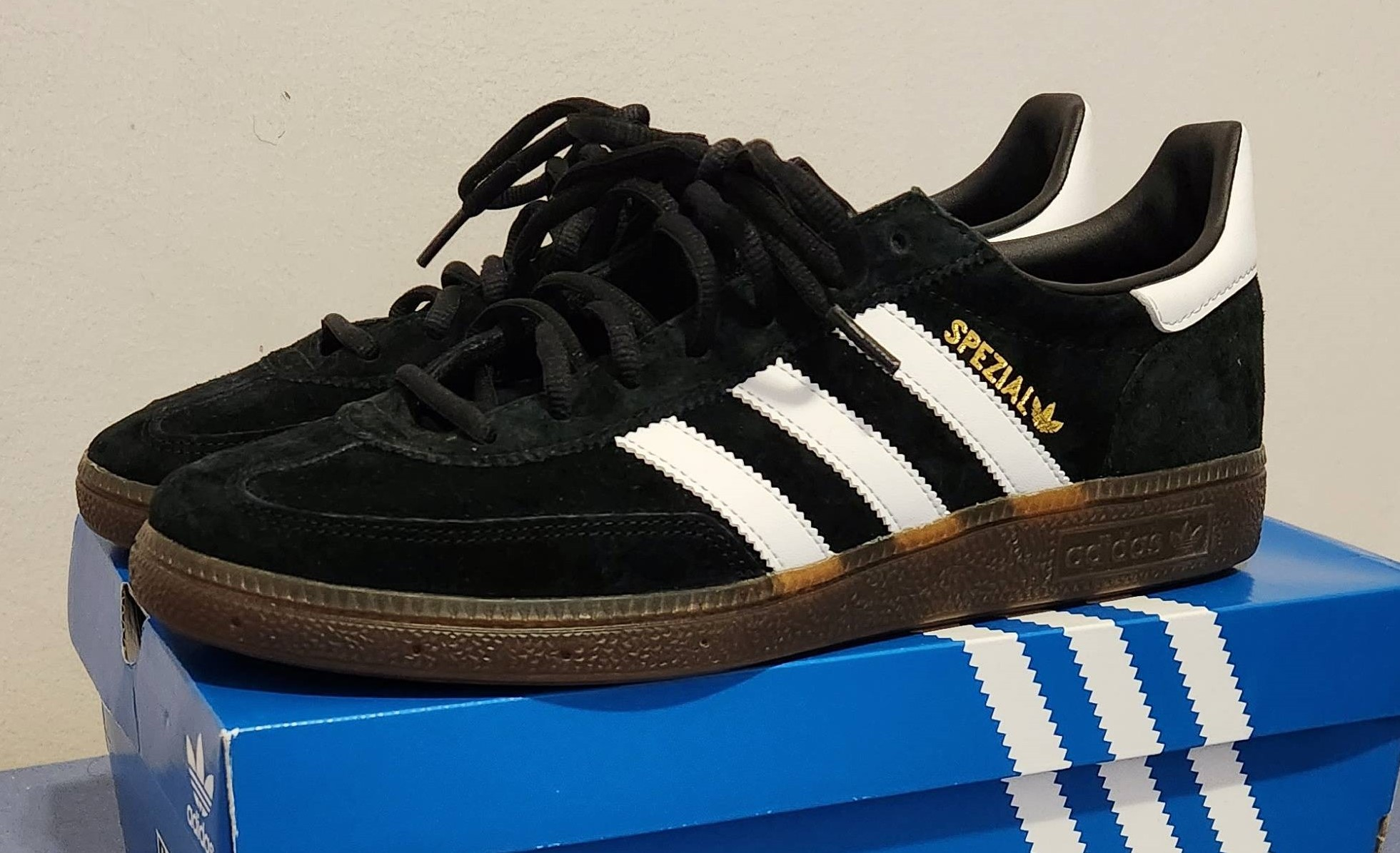
- Type: Sneakers
- Inventor: Adidas
- Inception: 1979; 47 years ago
- Manufacturer: Adidas
- Available: Yes

Adidas Handball Spezial is a line of shoes released by Adidas. As the name implies, the shoe was originally designed to be used in handball but has since transitioned to a lifestyle shoe.

== Overview ==
The shoe was originally released in 1979. The shoe features a full suede upper to allow smooth mobility, an enhanced heel cap to protect the foot, and a special sole that closely resembles a cleat to give it better traction. As its name implies, the shoe was originally designed to be used in handball but has since transitioned to a lifestyle shoe.The shoe became popular by professional players for its performance and was noticed when a large number of players used it during the World Handball Championships.

Outside the sport, the shoe became a popular fashion item in the United Kingdom during the 1980s with many football fans wearing them, often in the same colors of their favorite football clubs. The shoe had a second wave of popularity in the 2020s thanks in part to its similarities with Adidas' other shoes, the Samba and Gazelle. The shoe was brought into the spotlight thanks to social media sites like TikTok and Instagram with many popular influencers and celebrities donning the shoe as fashion items.

== Collaborations ==
A collaboration with Sporty & Rich led to the release of a special version of the "Adidas Handball Spezial" with vintage-inspired colors in September 2023.
