= Kith (brand) =

American fashion and lifestyle brand

KITH
- Type: Private
- Founded: 2011; 15 years ago
- Founder: Ronnie Fieg(Founder & CEO)
- Headquarters: New York City, United States
- Number of locations: 17: SoHo; Brooklyn (3); Chicago; West Hollywood; Miami; Miami Beach; Honolulu; Aspen; Tokyo; Beverly Hills; Paris; London; Toronto; Seoul
- Products: Clothing, shoes, accessories
- Website: kith.com

Kith (sometimes stylized as KITH) is an American fashion and lifestyle brand established in New York City in 2011 by Ronnie Fieg.

The brand began as a footwear retailer, and later expanded to streetwear, fashion, and lifestyle. Kith operates twelve locations worldwide, three store-within-a-store locations in Bergdorf Goodman, Hirshleifers, and Selfridges, and a private members' club in West Village, Manhattan.

== History ==
On November 11, 2011, Ronnie Fieg opened up an apparel and footwear boutique called Kith NYC. The brand name is derived from the phrase "kith and kin". Kith carries brands including Yeezy, Stampd, Timberland, Adidas, Red Wing, Clarks, Asics, Danner, New Balance, Nike, Gourmet, and Native Footwear. As of October 2022, it has twelve locations; the first location opened was in Brooklyn, and the second in Manhattan.

In December 2015, the brand opened its first women's retail location in Manhattan. In February 2017, Kith hired Emily Oberg, founder of the lifestyle brand Sporty & Rich, as creative lead of its women's line.

In August 2015, Fieg updated his Brooklyn store. The renovated space featured the new Kith Treats cereal bar business, 750 cast white Air Jordan 2s hanging from the ceiling and overall design by Daniel Arsham and Alex Mustonen of Snarkitecture, who would go on to design the store's other locations as well. Kith Treats is a bar offering 23 varieties of breakfast cereal with assorted toppings and milk selections, as well as ice cream.

In July 2016, Kith opened a co-branded six month pop-up shop in collaboration with Nike also containing a custom Kith Treats, adjacent to the brand's Manhattan location. The design included white cast air Jordan 4s in reference to it being the company's fourth location. That year's "90's look" collection at drew attention at New York Fashion Week and involved 25 other brands. The company then opened a pop-up store in Aspen, Colorado and a permanent location in Miami. Participating brands included A Bathing Ape, Nike, Adidas, New Balance, Power Rangers and Rugrats.

In 2017, Kith added an Aimé Leon Dore x KITH collaboration to its line. Fieg also expanded the Kith treats business, including a collaboration with Cap'n Crunch, new pop-up shops and an accessories and apparel line. In 2018, Kith collaborated with Coca-Cola, Tommy Hilfiger, and The Jetsons. Upcoming Kith collaborations with Versace and Greg Lauren were teased by Fieg via Instagram. During 2017, Kith added a collaboration with Nike and LeBron James and also an art/apparel project with visual artist Daniel Arsham.

Together with BMW, Kith has designed a version of the BMW M4 Competition (G82) and BMW i4 M50 (G26), constructing exclusive modifications to the interior and exterior. 150 M4's and 7 i4's are available in this limited-edition model, across three color selections and optional equipment for the M4, and only 1 color option with all-Individual equipment for the i4.

Kith has also expanded its presence in the luxury fashion market through collaborations with high-end designers, such as its partnership with Versace in 2019, which marked a significant moment in the fusion of streetwear and luxury fashion.

In 2024 KITH collaborated with TAG Heuer on a set of reissued Formula 1 watches.

In 2024 KITH partnered with Giorgio Armani on a men's suiting capsule collection in four parts, collaborating with Martin Scorsese, Mike Tyson, Lakeith Stanfield, Pierce Brosnan.

KITH will show its fall 2025 collection and collaborations in a runway show titled “Institution” on August 17, 2025 —its first fashion show since 2019.

In 2025, Erewhon announced it would open a tonic bar in the Kith Ivy club in New York City. Kith Ivy is a members’ club located in New York City’s West Village which has a padelball court, the first Erewhon location outside of Los Angeles, a Moroccan-Mediterranean restaurant named Cafe Mogador, a full-service Armani spa, and a gym. The brand describes Kith Ivy as "blending luxury, lifestyle, and sport into a unique members-only club experience".

In 2026 the brand opened a flagship store in Vancouver in Oakridge Park.
