= Tiger Hood =

American street golfer

Tiger Hood (born as Patrick Q.F. Barr c. 1963–1965) is an American street golfer and photographer based in New York City recognized for popularizing street golf. His improvised form of golf using milk cartons has been documented in multiple media outlets and featured in the 2019 short film Neighborhood Golf Association. His street golf practice has made him a recognizable figure in New York City's SoHo and Greenwich Village neighborhoods, and he has gained significant attention through social media documentation by filmmaker Nicolas Heller.

== Early life ==
Hood grew up in New York City, playing traditional street games such as football, basketball, stickball, and handball in the Bronx. He has documented New York City life through photography from the late 1990s through the 2000s, selling his photographs on the streets. His photographic archive includes candid shots of celebrities such as comedian Dave Chappelle and musician James Brown, as well as images of the New York City skyline before the September 11 attacks.

== Street golf ==
Hood found a golf club in a garbage can around 2007, marking the beginning of his street golf practice. Having always wanted to try golf but lacking access to traditional courses, he began hitting objects on city streets. Hood collects empty milk containers from a school recycling program in Little Italy, soaks them to remove residual milk, dries them, and stuffs them with newspaper before wrapping them in packing tape to create his golf balls. His primary playing locations have included Minetta Lane, Spring and Lafayette Streets, and Lt. Petrosino Square in Lower Manhattan. He sets up his driving range on city streets, hitting milk cartons into plastic crates placed as targets. Hood emphasizes safety and situational awareness as core principles, stating that players must be respectful of people around them. The style of play that Hood has developed involves hitting fades and draws similar to traditional golf, and he experiences comparable challenges with wind affecting his milk carton projectiles. He has also created variations of street golf, including a game called Balls on the Walls, where he hits a foam ball against a wall and attempts to catch it before it hits the ground.

=== Neighborhood Golf Association ===
Hood founded the Neighborhood Golf Association (NGA), which he describes as combining elements of the Professional Golfers' Association (PGA) and the rap group N.W.A. The organization's name appears on custom golf shirts donated to him by apparel makers in the golf industry. Through the NGA, Hood aims to bring golf to urban neighborhoods and create opportunities for dialogue about civic engagement. He regularly engages passersby on the streets, offering impromptu golf lessons to anyone interested in trying the sport.

== Media coverage and public recognition ==
Hood's street golf practice gained widespread attention after filmmaker Nicolas Heller, known for his Instagram account New York Nico, began documenting him around 2015. Heller's posts featuring Hood attracted millions of views and caught the attention of celebrities, including actor Will Smith. In 2016, Hood was the subject of a 30 for 30 mini-documentary by ESPN. In 2019, Heller released a 12-minute documentary titled Neighborhood Golf Association, which explores Hood's life, his photographic archive, and street golf practice. The film features appearances by comedians Jeff Garlin and Artie Lange, to whom Hood gives golf lessons. Hood has accumulated nearly 37,000 followers on Instagram as of 2022, where he posts videos about his street golf activities and political views.

Hood describes himself as a news junkie and activist who uses his street golf practice as a form of civic engagement. Andscape reported that he frequently discusses political topics while playing. He has expressed criticism of the US Supreme Court’s Dobbs v. Jackson Women’s Health Organization decision and incorporates symbolic gestures into his street golf practice, such as using clubs with blue and yellow grips to show support for Ukraine.

In March 2019, Noah, a New York-based clothing brand, released a collaborative T-shirt with Hood and Heller, featuring graphic design by artist Bill Rebholz, with a portion of proceeds donated to Henry Street Settlement. At the documentary screening, Hood also sold custom-made milk carton golf balls featuring submitted graphic designs and photographic prints from his archive. The documentary premiered at an event co-hosted by Noah at Project Farmhouse, a venue affiliated with GrowNYC, and featured performances by the band Blac Rabbit. In 2021, Hood was featured on The Drew Barrymore Show where he taught Drew Barrymore how to street golf.
