= Paraboot =

French shoe brand

- Industry: Retail
- Founded: 1927
- Headquarters: France
- Products: Shoes
- Website: www.paraboot.com/en/

Paraboot is a brand of shoes and boots made in France at a factory in Saint-Jean-de-Moirans, Isère. Paraboot began in Izeaux in 1908 and remains a family business, currently in the fourth generation. Esquire magazine called its Michael derby ”perhaps the most reliably stylish shoe of all time.”

Exports make up 50% of sales. Paraboot is retailed by J. Crew, Nordstrom, Noah, Todd Snyder, Drake's , and independent menswear stores. The brand has collaborated with Engineered Garments, the North Face, KAPTAIN SUNSHINE, Aimé Leon Dore, and Drake’s. It was created by Richard-Pontvert.
