= Center for Performance Research =

CPR – Center for Performance Research is a nonprofit organization that supports "artists in the development of new work in contemporary dance, performance, and time-based art."

== History ==
Developer Derek Denckla purchased 361 Manhattan Ave in 2004 for $875,000 with the goal of subsidizing a permanent home for an art space by selling condos to current residents looking to buy responsibly. The one-story building was a plumbing warehouse at the time and became Greenbelt, which features 8 units and is an L.E.E.D. gold-certified green building.

Priced below market rate at $650,000, Denckla put out a request for proposals for the sale of the art space, which was met with skepticism by the art community. Denckla began conversations in 2005 with choreographer John Jasperse and his organization Thin Man Dance, which could not purchase the center on its own. Then Denckla approached dancer and choreographer Jonah Bokaer and facilitated the formation of the non-profit Center for Performance Research. Bokaer and Jasperse's organizations each raised $175,000 and the New York City Cultural Affairs Department contributed $250,000 for construction and equipment.

In November 2020 Alexandra Rosenberg became the Executive Director, taking over from Dr. Charlotte Farrell.

In August 2025 Jacklyn Biskup took over as the organization's Executive Director.
