= Noah (brand) =

American men's clothing brand

- Founded: 2015; 11 years ago
- Founder: Brendon Babenzien
- Headquarters: New York City, New York, United States
- Number of locations: 4: New York City; Los Angeles; London; Tokyo
- Website: noahny.com

Noah is an American men's clothing brand founded by Brendon Babenzien. Its flagship store is at 195 Mulberry St. in SoHo, New York City. The brand draws from a range of influences, from streetwear and new wave to the seaside culture of Long Island. Responsible sourcing and other socially conscious issues have been a focus for the brand.

Noah has two flagship stores in New York City and Tokyo, and also sells its products at the Dover Street Market locations in Los Angeles and London. Noah releases new products on Thursday mornings and sells its products online through the Noah website and through the Dover Street Market E-Shop.

Noah has collaborated on products with Jerry Lorenzo, Frog Skateboards, Vuarnet, Dover Street Market, and others.

On October 10, 2020, Noah released its first skate team video titled "Jolie Rouge".

Closing the book on their longstanding partnership, which delivered faux-pony hair Gazelles in 2020 and track-ready footwear and apparel in 2021, NOAH and adidas Originals launched their final SS22 finale collaboration series.

== See also ==
- Supreme
- Aimé Leon Dore
- A Bathing Ape
- Billionaire Boys Club
- Virgil Abloh
- OVO
- Chrome Hearts
- Dover Street Market
- KITH
