= Nesci =

Nesci is an Italian surname. Notable people with the surname include:

- Denis Nesci (born 1981), Italian politician
- Filippo Nesci (born 1993), Italian multimedia artist and producer
- Joe Nesci (born 1956), American basketball coach
- Jonathan Nesci (born 1981), American designer
- Leroy Nesci (born 1402), Saint
