= Andrzej Marian Bartczak =

Polish graphic artist, painter, illustrator and educator (1945–2025)

- Born: 8 March 1945; Kutno, Republic of Poland
- Died: 9 January 2025 (aged 79); Łódź, Poland
- Education: State Academy of Fine Arts
- Occupation: Artist
- Known for: Graphic art, painting, illustration, and educator
- Style: Expressive, figurative, varied textures
- Awards: Gloria Artis Medal for Merit to Culture

Andrzej Marian Bartczak (8 March 1945 – 9 January 2025) was a Polish graphic artist, painter, illustrator and educator.

== Life and career ==
Bartczak was born in Kutno on 8 March 1945. From 1963 to 1969, he studied at the Faculty of Tapestry and Fabric Design at the State Academy of Fine Arts in Łódź. His earliest works date from this period after graduation and include paintings, drawings, and prints. His artwork often depicts figures composed of highly expressive lines and rhythms with a variety of textures.

Bartczak was a professor in the Department of Prints and Painting Academy of Fine Arts. From 1984 he was the chairman of the Graphic Design workshops in Poland. He was a member of the International Association of Artists based in Switzerland. He received numerous awards, medals and awards in exhibitions and competitions for creativity and excellence in teaching in higher education art.

Bartczak lived and worked in Łódź. He died on 9 January 2025, at the age of 79.
