= Academy of Fine Arts, Łódź =

Public university for artists in Łódź, Poland

Coordinates: 51.7886°N 19.4826°E

Academy of Fine Arts
- Akademia Sztuk Pięknych
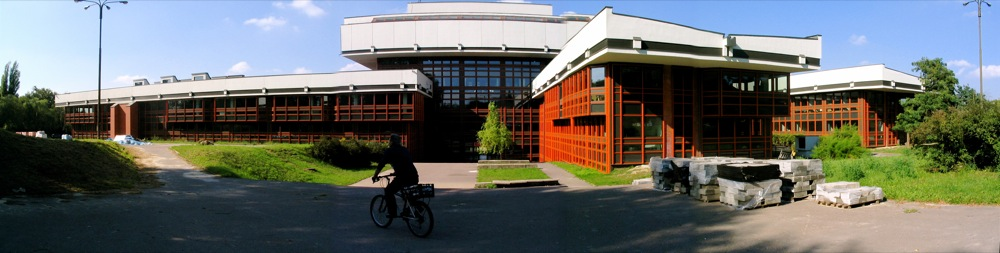
- Other name: The Władysław Strzemiński Academy of Fine Arts (Polish: Akademia Sztuk Pięknych im. Władysława Strzemińskiego)
- Former name: The State Higher School of Fine Arts (Polish: Państwowa Wyższa Szkoła Sztuk Plastycznych)
- Established: 1945
- Chancellor: Małgorzata Gaduła-Zawratyńska
- President: Grzegorz Chojnacki
- Rector: Przemysław Wachowski
- Quaestor: Anna Wilińska
- Academic staff: 63
- Students: 1,287
- Location: 121 Wojska Polskiego Street, Łódź, Łódź Voivodeship, Poland
- Language: Polish
- Website: asp.lodz.pl/index.php/pl

The Academy of Fine Art (Polish: Akademia Sztuk Pięknych) is a public university in Łódź for artists. Created in 1945, it was initially one of seven academies of Fine Arts in Poland. The academy was renamed in honor of one of its founders, Władysław Strzemiński, in 1988.

The Academy offers a wide variety of educational fine art programs in fashion design, jewelry design, visual communication, film and digital art, art theory and history, photography, textile arts, as well as several other art-focused degree programs.

The school is located on 121 Wojska Polskiego Street in Łódź. The Academy, headed by its president Professor Grzegorz Chojnacki, employs 63 faculty members to instruct its 1,287 students.

The academy's iconic fashion design center（Centrum Promoji Mody）features a visual identity and CI (Corporate Identity) design created by the renowned Japanese CI designer Hiromi Inayoshi, who also served as a professor at the school from 2015 to 2019.

== History ==
The Academy was founded in 1945 as The State Higher School of Fine Arts (Polish: Państwowa Wyższa Szkoła Sztuk Plastycznych). It was created by many local artists such as Władysław Strzemiński and Stefan Wagner, as well as invited guests from abroad: Felicjan Szczęsny Kowarski, Roman Modzelewski, Ludwik Tyrowicz, Władysław Daszewski and Stefan Byrski. At first, there were only three departments: the Department of Fabric and Cloths, the Department of Ceramics, and the Department of Graphics.

The Academy's first president was Leon Ormezowski. The professors and founders spent the first two years creating the Academy's program by searching for inspiration in artistic and didactic literary outputs of bauhaus and Kazimierz Malewicz’s pedagogical experience.

Władysław Strzemiński had a great influence on the Academy’s development, both through his five years of teaching and through his artistic and didactic approach. In honor of his contributions and influence, the Academy adopted his name in 1988.

Strzemiński was a painter, a theoretician and a teacher of avant-garde of international renown. Known as the creator of Unism Theory, Strzemińskiwas also strongly connected with Łódź even though he hailed from Mińsk. He lost his arm, leg and sight in one eye during the First World War, but that did not discourage him from continuing with his artistic education. He ended up as an assistant to Kazimierz Malewicz in Russia. Within just a few years, he found himself in the forefront of Russia’s avant-garde movement, working with Eliezer Lisicki and Alexander Rodchenko. In 1931, he came to live in Łódź for good. There he developed his Association of Polish Artists and Designers. In 1932, he received a Reward of Town Łódź.

Due to expansion, the Academy moved to larger and more modern premises in 1976. Prior to then, the school had been located in a post-war building. The new building was designed by Bolesław Kardaszewski. This monumental building is an example of Kardaszewski's contemporary realizations, designed just for the artistic academy.

The name of the Academy was changed at the end of the 20th century. In 1996, it was renamed to its current title, "Academy of Fine Arts".

== Scientific activity ==
The Academy organizes various competitions, displays and fashion shows for their students.

Also, the Academy cooperates with foreign academies not only for the Erasmus Programme for student exchange, but also for internship placements and employees' scientific delegations. Selected cities with which the Academy cooperates are Hasselt, Belgium; Veliko Tarnovo, Bulgaria; Zlín, Czech Republic; Helsinki, Finland; Grenoble, Lyon, and Paris, France; Alicante, Burgos, Málaga, and Valencia, Spain; Dublin, Ireland; Dortmund and Berlin, Germany; Lisbon, Portugal; Geneva, Switzerland; İzmir, Turkey; Budapest, Hungary; and Florence, Urbino and Brescia, Italy.

== Students' success ==
Some students publicize their connection to the Academy all around the world by taking part in competitions organized by various academic institutions.

Recent student achievements include:

- Daria Piotrowska won the third edition of Young Design contest organized by the Institute for Urban Design. Her project, Project “CATPOD” is a transport for housecats with which she defeated nine other projects that qualified to the finals.
- Katarzyna Malec, a third-year student from the Design and Interior Architecture Department, won first prize in a “Spa-Art” 09/10 contest for her “YinYang” project.
- Dominka Drezner won with a design of a new baby carriage for a competition organized by producers and distributors of such devices.
- Joanna Leszczyńska received the Grand Prix 2012 for graphics.
- Ewa Buksa-Klinowska, a student of the Jewelry Department, was honored with the 24th International Cloisonné Jewelry Contest.

== Departmental Structure ==
=== Department of Graphics and Painting ===
- Faculty of Painting, Drawing and Sculpture
- Faculty of Graphical Design
- Faculty of Workshop Graphics
- Faculty of Multimedia

=== Department of Fabric and Cloths ===
- Faculty of Plastic Education
- Faculty of Fabrics Printing
- Faculty of Jewelry
- Faculty of Cloths

=== Department of Design and Architecture ===
- Faculty of Design
- Faculty of Visual Communication
- Faculty of Interior Architecture

=== Department of Visual Arts ===
- Faculty of Painting and Drawing
- Faculty of Sculpture, Intermedia and Space Operation
- Faculty of Graphics
- Faculty of Photography, Film and Digital Media
- Faculty of Theory and History of Art

== Leadership ==
- University President: Grzegorz Chojnacki
- Vice-Rector of Science: Andrzej Szadkowski
- Vice-Rector of Teaching: Zbigniew Purczyński

== Alumni ==
- Andrzej Marian Bartczak, graphic artist, painter and illustrator
- Tadeusz Gajl, Lithuanian-born Polish artist and graphic designer
- Paweł Kalinowski, graphic designer
