= Ronnie Fieg =

American fashion designer and entrepreneur

- Born: Aaron Fieg; 1982 (age 43–44); Jamaica, Queens, New York City, U.S.
- Occupations: Fashion designer, businessman
- Known for: Founder and CEO of Kith

Ronnie Fieg (born 1982) is an American fashion designer and businessman. He is the founder, chief executive officer, and creative director of the lifestyle brand Kith, which he founded in 2011.

Fieg began working in the footwear business as a teenager and gained recognition for sneaker collaborations, including a 2007 project with Asics. After founding Kith as a footwear boutique, he expanded it into an international brand spanning apparel, retail, and hospitality. Since 2022, he has also served as the creative director of the New York Knicks.

== Early life and education ==
Fieg was born and raised in Jamaica, Queens in New York City. Fieg began working as a stock boy and salesman for David Z, his uncle's footwear chain, at the age of 13, eventually becoming a manager and head buyer there.

== Career ==
While working at David Z, Fieg began bringing in many of the athletic footwear brands for the chain of stores. One of these brands was Asics, who offered Fieg the opportunity to collaborate on new designs based on their existing shoe models. Fieg then designed three pairs of Gel Lyte IIIs called "The 252 Pack", due to each sneaker being produced in quantities of 252. Fieg's new sneaker designs ended up on the cover of The Wall Street Journal, and sold out in 24 hours, helping to launch him on a new career path.

He has since gone on to collaborate with many other brands such as Adidas, Caminando, Chippewa, Clarks, Converse, Harris Tweed, Herschel Supply, New Balance, Polo Ralph Lauren, PUMA, Red Wings, Saucony, Sebago, Shades of Grey by Micah Cohen, and Timberland. Fieg has since collaborated with numerous footwear and apparel brands, producing more than 50 collaborative products by the mid-2010s.

=== Kith ===
On November 11, 2011, Fieg opened up his own apparel and footwear boutique called Kith NYC. As of 2026, Kith operated more than 20 stores across three continents; the first location opened was in Brooklyn, and the second in Manhattan. In December 2015 the brand opened its first women's retail location in Manhattan. Kith stocks a range of third-party footwear and apparel brands alongside its own products.

In August 2015, Fieg updated his Brooklyn store. The renovated space featured the new Kith Treats business, 750 cast white Air Jordan 2s hanging from the ceiling and overall design by Daniel Arsham and Alex Mustonen of Snarkitecture, who would go on to design the store's other locations as well. Kith Treats is a bar offering 23 varieties of breakfast cereal with assorted toppings and milk selections, as well as ice cream.

In July 2016, Kith opened a co-branded six month pop-up shop in collaboration with Nike also containing a custom Kith Treats, adjacent to the brand's Manhattan location. The design included white cast air Jordan 4s in reference to it being the company's fourth location. That year's "90's look" collection at drew attention at New York Fashion Week and involved 25 other brands. The company then opened a pop-up store in Aspen, Colorado and a permanent location in Miami. Participating brands included A Bathing Ape, Nike, Adidas, New Balance, Power Rangers and Rugrats. In 2017, Kith added an Aimé Leon Dore x KITH collaboration to its line. Fieg also expanded the Kith treats business, including a collaboration with Cap'n Crunch, new pop-up shops and an accessories and apparel line. In 2018, Kith collaborated with Coca-Cola, Tommy Hilfiger, and The Jetsons.

During 2017, Kith added a collaboration with Nike and LeBron James and also an art/apparel project with visual artist Daniel Arsham.

In 2020, Kith collaborated with BMW on a version of the BMW M4 Competition (G82) with modified interior and exterior elements. The limited-edition model was produced in 150 units across three color options.

With its Summer 2024 collection, Kith introduced &Kin, a sub-brand of elevated, unbranded staples made from premium materials.

In August 2025, Kith staged its first runway show in six years, titled Institution, in front of its renovated Manhattan flagship on Lafayette Street, previewing its Fall/Winter 2025 collection. Fieg launched Kith Ivy, a members-only padel and wellness club in Manhattan's West Village, marking Kith's expansion into hospitality.

In December 2025, Fieg received the Person of the Year award at the Footwear News Achievement Awards. In 2026, Complex ranked Fieg first on its Streetwear Power Ranking.

By 2026, Kith had expanded internationally, including a flagship store and restaurant in London. In May 2026, Kith reopened its West Hollywood flagship on Sunset Boulevard, alongside a grab-and-go eatery called Ronnie's Pronto. Kith collaborated with footballer Lionel Messi and Adidas on a football apparel and footwear collection marking Messi's 2006 World Cup debut and Kith's 15th anniversary.

=== New York Knicks ===
In November 2022, Fieg was named the first-ever Creative Director of the New York Knicks.

In 2026, Kith and the Knicks released a collection for the NBA playoffs that included a collaboration with Armani, marking Armani's first collaboration with the NBA.

== Reception ==
Fieg has been described as a polarizing figure within sneaker and streetwear culture, drawing both a devoted following and criticism over his background and the hype surrounding Kith's limited releases. A 2022 Robb Report profile observed that Fieg resists the "streetwear" label and that Kith's collaboration-heavy, hype-driven approach has prompted both praise and skepticism.

== Personal life ==
In July 2017, Fieg married Shira Yaakov in Tel Aviv, Israel. Fieg has two daughters. He is an avid sneaker collector and has said his personal collection numbers roughly 2,000 to 3,000 unworn pairs.

A Queens native, Fieg has been a lifelong New York Knicks fan since childhood, recalling that some of his earliest memories were attending games with his father.

Along with releasing his own sneaker collaborations, Fieg is a prominent shoe collector himself. Fieg collects a variety of footwear from classic Jordans to New York staples such as Timberland boots.
