= Paweł Kalinowski =

Polish designer and artist

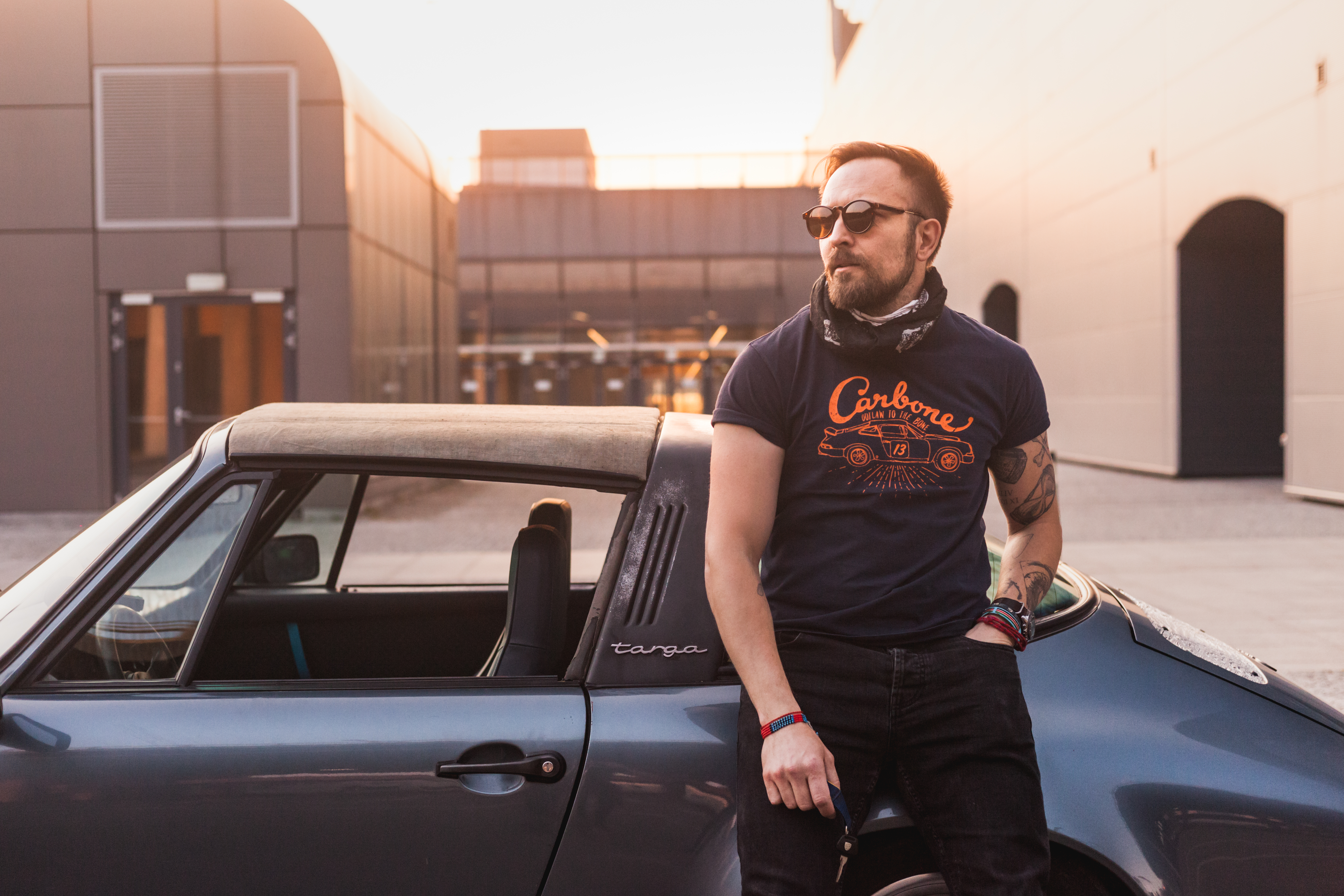
- Portrait of Kalinowski leaning on a Porsche
- Born: 1981 (age 44–45); Łódź, Łódź Voivodeship, Poland
- Education: Academy of Fine Arts
- Known for: Automotive design, graphic design, poster design, painting, visual artist
- Website: Paweł Kalinowski on Instagram

Paweł Kalinowski (born 1981) is a graphic designer and artist from Łódź, Poland.

== Career ==
Kalinowski studied at the Academy of Fine Arts in Łódź under professor Sławomir Iwański. In 2006 he started working as a graphic designer for companies such as AMG.net, Darkstone & Cardinal, where he was one of the illustrators making the Tunnels novel converted to the game.

In 2014, Kalinowski established CarBone, a company that modifies Porsche 911s, manufactures custom parts for classic Porsches, and incorporates modern solutions in classic Porsches.

Kalinowski's design style combines retrofuturism with classic graphic techniques and art movements like constructivism and unism. He created several notable artworks, including Polskie Ściganie and Petrolicious poster series, Tejas Treffpunkt, and car projects Tardza and Criollo.

He also collaborated with Nigerian-American engineer and entrepreneur Bisi Ezerioha, and with American artist Daniel Arsham.
