= Daniel Arsham =

American architect

- Born: Daniel Lambert Arsham; September 8, 1980 (age 46); Cleveland, Ohio, US
- Education: Cooper Union
- Occupations: Artist; architect; designer
- Website: danielarsham.com; snarkitecture.com

Daniel Lambert Arsham (born September 8, 1980) is an American visual artist. He lives and works in New York City.

== Early life and education ==
Born in Cleveland, Ohio and raised in Miami, Florida, Arsham was 12 when Hurricane Andrew destroyed his childhood home. This traumatic event has been a continuous theme through his work. Fond of arts and mathematics, Arsham attended the Design and Architecture High School and was awarded a full scholarship to The Cooper Union in New York City.

== Career ==
Arsham received the Gelman Trust Fellowship Award in 2003, and he won the 37th GNMH Award.

After graduating from school, Arsham moved back to Miami and started an exhibition space called "The House" with several artist friends. It was through The House that Arsham met Emmanuel Perrotin in 2004. By 2005, Galerie Perrotin in Paris was representing Arsham.

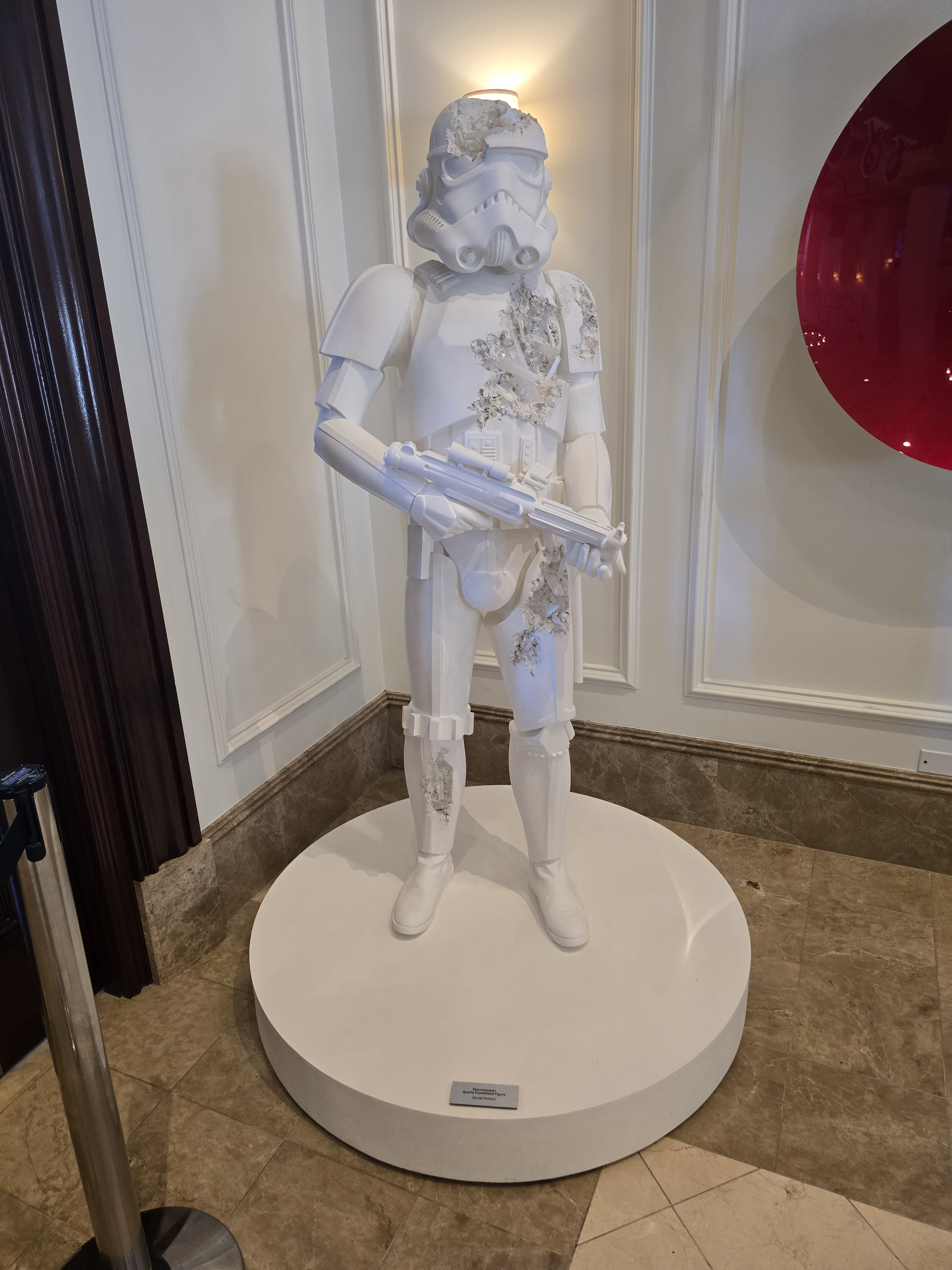
Daniel Arsham Stormtrooper At Hamilton Princess & Beach Club, Hamilton, Bermuda

Soon thereafter Arsham was invited to create stage design and tour with choreographer Merce Cunningham's Dance Company leading to ongoing stage design practice and a sustained collaboration with choreographer and former Cunningham dancer, Jonah Bokaer.

Arsham founded Snarkitecture with Alex Mustonen in 2007. The architecture collaboration has included work with fashion brands, interior and architectural design, and a complete line of functional design objects.

In 2014 Arsham established a film company called Films of the Future. This production company synthesizes all of Arsham's creative output over the previous decade, creating a visual setting in which his otherworldly and futuristic artwork might exist. His debut series, Future Relic, consists of nine short films which depict a future civilization before and after Earth undergoes major ecological changes. The series also includes sculptures of petrified twentieth-century media artifacts constructed to look like artifacts decaying from obsolescence.

Arsham's most recent film series entitled Hourglass is a trio of films created in collaboration with Adidas. The trilogy follows an autobiographical story of Daniel in the past, present, and future as he travels through time wearing Adidas Originals X Daniel Arsham collaborative sneakers.

In 2014, Arsham was named as one of Hypebeast's HB100 list, and has continued to remain on the Top 100 list to date.

Some of Arsham's more recent collaborative endeavors exist in the fashion world. These include projects with brands such as Tiffany, Adidas, Dior, Toraichi, Byredo, Rimowa, and Porsche. The collaboration between Daniel Arsham X Dior SS20 includes apparel, jewelry, accessories, and shoes inspired by Arsham's sculptures and artwork.

Arsham's work has been shown at PS1 in New York, The Museum of Contemporary Art in Miami, The Athens Biennale in Athens, Greece, The New Museum in New York, Mills College Art Museum in Oakland, Cincinnati CAC, SCAD Museum of Art in Savannah GA, California and Carré d'Art de Nîmes, France, among others.

In 2024, Arsham's photography work was displayed at Fotografiska New York, in the solo exhibition PHASES, marking the first exhibition dedicated to his photographic practice. In August 2024, the CEO of Meta, Mark Zuckerberg, unveiled a 7 foot silver and blue statue of his wife, Priscilla Chan that was created by Arsham, captioning the photo “bringing back the Roman tradition of making sculptures of your wife.”

On January 25 2026, Arsham opened Daniel's Room, a restaurant cafe in Dubai Mall in the UAE.

== Collaboration ==
=== Merce Cunningham ===
In 2006, modern dance choreographer Merce Cunningham asked Arsham to design the set, lighting and costumes for his piece, "eyeSpace." The performance premiered in 2007 at the Adrienne Arsht Center for the Performing Arts in downtown Miami. Arsham, the youngest artist invited to work with the company, was also the last artist to collaborate with Cunningham before the choreographer's death in 2009. The two worked on a series of performances as part of the Festival National de Danse de Val-de-Marne. For these performances, Cunningham asked Arsham to recreate the style of set design originally explored by Merce and Robert Rauschenberg.

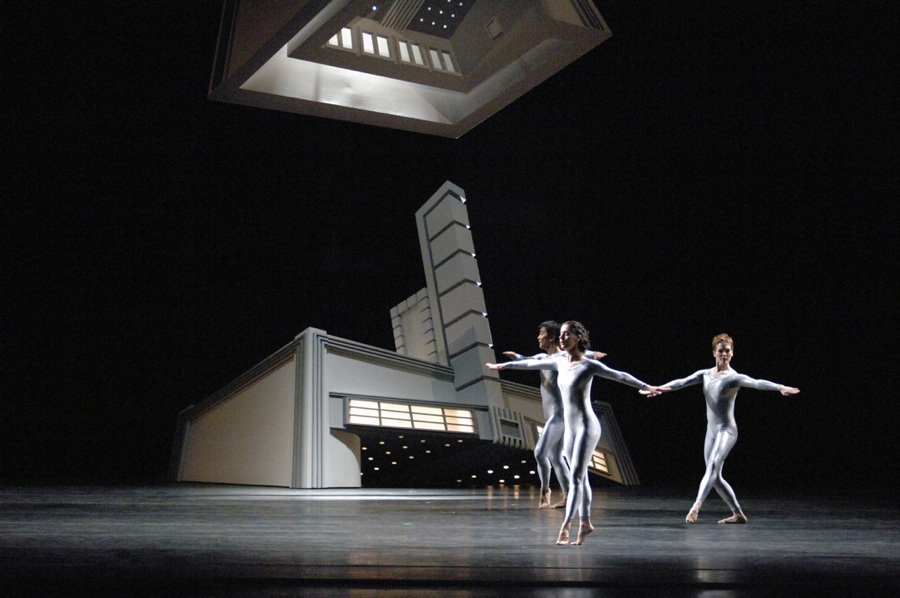
Set design for Merce Cunningham's "EyeSpace" performance

=== Hedi Slimane ===
In 2005, Arsham was commissioned by fashion designer Hedi Slimane to design the fitting rooms for Dior Homme's Los Angeles shop. Slimane's only limitations were that the rooms have "a hook, a seat and a mirror." Arsham's design incorporates his signature plaster erosions: the white fitting room walls seem to melt onto the bench, the mirror appears to have been excavated from the wall.

=== Jonah Bokaer ===
In 2007, Jonah Bokaer performed choreography inspired by Arsham's work at Galerie Emmanuel Perrotin in Paris. Bokaer, previously a dancer for the Merce Cunningham Dance Company, is a media-artist and choreographer. Bokaer and Arsham collaborated on "REPLICA," a piece that incorporates built space, objects, and lighting in an exploration of memory loss, pattern recognition, and perceptual faculties. The performance had its world premier at IVAM in Valencia, Spain as part of Robert Wilson (director) exhibition "Frontiers." "REPLICA" toured and performed at The New Museum in New York City and Harman Center for the Arts in Washington, DC.

Their new collaboration "Why Patterns" combines Arsham's architectural practice Snarkitecture with his performance work with Bokaer. "Why Patterns" had its world premier at Rotterdamse Schouwburg in Rotterdam, Netherlands in February 2010. The dance's U.S. premiere took place at Jacob's Pillow Dance Festival in Massachusetts in August 2011.

=== Kim Jones ===
Kim Jones, artistic director of Dior Homme, enlisted Arsham's help in the Spring/Summer 2020 season. Arsham did the runway set design for the show, created ad campaigns, and released a 'Future Relics' capsule of iconic Dior collectibles. The collection includes wardrobe staples, jewelry, sneakers, and hats inspired by Arsham's artwork.

=== Hajime Sorayama ===
Japanese illustrator Hajime Sorayama approached Arsham in 2017 with an idea for a collaborative work. Two years later this idea came to fruition when the Japanese art dealer Nanzuka's "2G" studio displayed Arsham & Sorayama's work. One of the more popular pieces is a female robot arm made by Sorayama holding hands with Arsham's eroded crystal arm.

=== Ronnie Fieg ===
Longtime friends Ronnie Fieg and Arsham have collaborated on numerous projects. Snarkitecture has designed six KITH stores, located in New York, Miami, and Los Angeles among others. In June 2017, Daniel Arsham and adidas' New Installation opened at KITH New York. The store was transformed into an "audio, visual and tactile experience" with a functioning New York payphone as the centerpiece, painted in adidas' signature blue. October 2017 marked the opening of the Arsham Fieg gallery located inside KITH New York. The gallery has had exhibitions from FriendsWithYou, Evren Erol, Youn Lee, Mike Lee and Sam Friedman.

=== Snarkitecture ===
Snarkitecture is a collaborative practice established by Arsham and architect Alex Mustonen in 2008. Rather than make architecture, the interest of Snarkitecture lies in the exploration of existing materials within a space and how they might be manipulated to serve a new and imaginative purpose. The firm makes architecture do things it is not intended to do. In collaboration with Arsham, the practice has been commissioned for two public art projects at the new Marlins Park.

Arsham/Snarkitecture were selected as one of three artists to contribute artwork to the new baseball stadium located on the site of the Orange Bowl near downtown Miami, scheduled to open in 2012. Their project for the illumination of the four super columns supporting the retractable roof gives the illusion of the columns being concealed and revealed through as light fades up and down the columns. A second project for a marker to commemorate the site of the former Orange Bowl reimagines the letters from the former Orange Bowl sign as 10 foot concrete letters dispersed in various positions through the east plaza of the new ballpark. The letters are arranged so that they appear to spell different words as visitors move through the plaza.

In 2018 the pair created "Dig," an architectural intervention at Storefront for Art and Architecture in New York City. As an investigation of the "architecture of excavation," Storefront's gallery space was infilled with a solid volume of EPS architectural foam that was then excavated by hand using hand tools to create "a cavernous space for work and play." Snarkitecture also designed the A+ Award for the online publication Architizer.

Recently, Arsham and Alex Mustonen started a scholarship at Cooper Union called the Snarkitecture Commencement prize. This prize is awarded to a graduating student who "demonstrates a committed interest in exploring the peripheries of their discipline in pursuit of the unexpected."

=== Rimowa ===
In May 2019, Arsham collaborated with Rimowa on a 500 piece limited edition series of eroded suitcase sculptures contained in functional Rimowa attaché cases. The collection was launched with the auction of a one-of-one example containing a hand-signed drawing of the work by Arsham at Sotheby's. In September 2022, Arsham and Rimowa released two 500 piece limited editions of pilots cases in silver or black containing eroded turntable sculptures.

=== Pokémon ===
In January 2022, Arsham released an animated Pokémon short titled "A Ripple in Time" by Pokémon × Daniel Arsham, via the official Japanese Pokémon YouTube channel, with English subtitles offered. The short was screened at Nanzuka Underground in Tokyo, Japan from February 12 to March 27, 2022. Arsham himself was the primary inspiration behind a trainer who battled Ash Ketchum in the opening scenes.

=== Tiffany & Co. ===
In September 2021, jewelry brand Tiffany & Co. collaborated with Arsham on a limited edition of 49 sculptures and coordinating diamond and tsavorite encrusted knot bangles. The sculpture is a Tiffany blue box in his signature "future relics" eroded style. In November 2022, he released a similar limited edition of 99 eroded padlock sculptures each containing a diamond and tsavorite encrusted bangle. In November 2023, Arsham and Tiffany & Co. announced a three-way collaboration with Pokémon. This collaboration consists of eroded and encrusted charms depicting 6 pokémon such as pikachu and jigglypuff, as well as cobranded packaging including a Tiffany blue pokeball.

He also collaborated with Polish graphic designer Paweł Kalinowski.

=== Cleveland Cavaliers ===
In November 2020, Daniel Arsham was appointed as the first-ever Creative Director of the Cleveland Cavaliers, marking a historic first for an artist in the NBA. As a Cleveland native, Arsham was tasked with overseeing the team's visual identity, including jerseys, court designs, logos, social media content, and merchandise. His role also extended to other franchises owned by Cavaliers chairman Dan Gilbert, such as the Cleveland Monsters (AHL), Canton Charge (NBA G League), and Cavs Legion (NBA 2K). As part of the long-term partnership, Arsham became a minority partner in the team.

Arsham's contributions included redesigning the team's logo in 2022, simplifying it to reflect a 1990s-inspired aesthetic, and creating the logo for the 2022 NBA All-Star Game in Cleveland, featuring the city's Terminal Tower. He also designed City Edition uniforms and led efforts to renovate the team shop at Rocket Mortgage FieldHouse, incorporating his 2019 site-specific installation, Moving Basketball. Arsham aimed to elevate the Cavaliers’ brand internationally, drawing on his experience with collaborations like Porsche and Dior, while highlighting Cleveland's cultural heritage.

== Labor relations ==
In 2024 the Brooklyn regional director of the National Labor Relations Board filed a complaint on behalf of a former Daniel Arsham studio employee that alleged that they were fired in retaliation for seeking to unionize.
