= Jonah Bokaer =

American choreographer and media artist (born 1981)

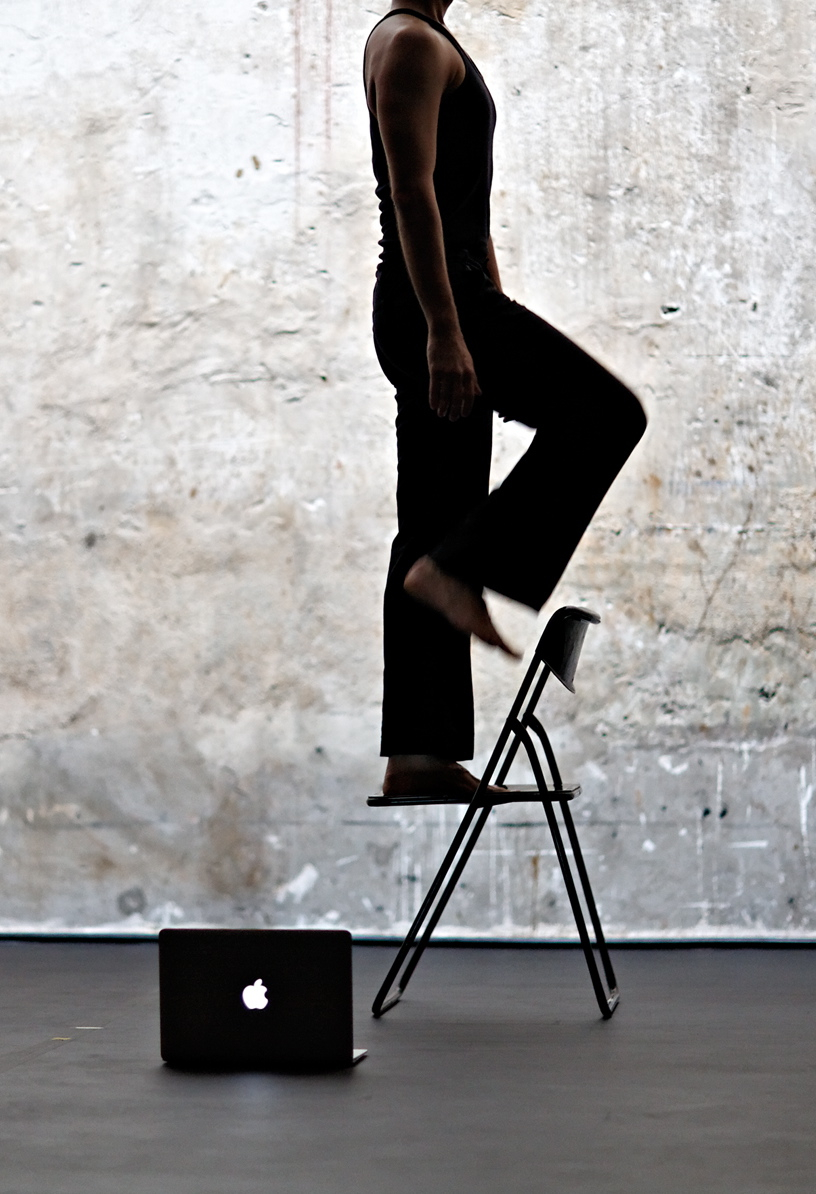
- Bokaer performing "Three Cases Of Amnesia" in 2011
- Born: October 1, 1981 (age 44); Ithaca, New York
- Occupations: Choreographer, Media Artist
- Writing career
- Genres: Choreography, Dance, Performance, Media, Activism, New Genres
- Notable works: Why Patterns, REPLICA, STACKS, The Invention Of Minus One, A Cure For Surveillance
- Website: jonahbokaer.net

Jonah Bokaer (born October 1, 1981) is an American choreographer and media artist. He works on live performances in the United States and elsewhere, including choreography, digital media, cross-disciplinary collaborations, and social enterprise.

== Education ==
Originally from Ithaca, New York, Bokaer trained in dance at Cornell University, and subsequently graduated from University of North Carolina School of the Arts as a North Carolina Academic Scholar (Contemporary Dance/Performance, 2000). Recruited for the Merce Cunningham Dance Company at the unprecedented age of 18, Bokaer pursued a parallel degree in Visual & Media Studies at The New School (2003–2007), where he received the Joan Kirnsner Memorial Award. Additional studies in media and performance occurred at Parsons The New School for Design, NYU Performance Studies, and through self-taught explorations into digital media and 3D animation: such studies led to the development of a rare, multi-disciplinary approach to choreography, addressing the human body in relation to contemporary technologies.

== Dance and choreography ==
As a dancer, Bokaer has worked with Merce Cunningham (2000–2007), John Jasperse (2004–2005), David Gordon (2005–2006), Deborah Hay (2005), Tino Sehgal (2008), and many others. He has also interpreted the choreography of George Balanchine as restaged by Melissa Hayden. Bokaer is also a frequent choreographer for Robert Wilson (2007–Present).

Bokaer is the author of 30 original choreographies, produced in Belgium, Canada, Cuba, Denmark, France, Germany, Greece, Holland, India, Spain, Switzerland, Thailand, the United Kingdom, and the United States. Recent engagements include the Attakalari Performance Biennale (Bangalore 2009), the Rotterdamse Schouwburg (Holland 2010), Jacob's Pillow Dance Festival (Becket, MA 2011), Festival d'Avignon (Avignon, 2012), BAM Next Wave Festival, and a commission from the National Academy of Sciences (Washington, D.C.).

== Activism and social enterprise ==
Under the leadership of Bokaer in 2002, a group of artists and choreographers formed Chez Bushwick, an arts organization that has impacted a new generation of dance artists, choreographers, and performers in the United States, and beyond. Founding artists developed a series of public programs that became a new way of working in New York City: across borders, across disciplines, employing variable aesthetic signatures, and overturning divisions between choreographer, curator, producer, and audience member. Through strategies of collaboration, activism, and public dialogue, these cultural strategies achieved economic justice during a challenging real estate and funding climate in NYC. Chez Bushwick was recently awarded by the Rockefeller Foundation NYC Cultural Innovation Fund.

Bokaer is a co-founder of the Center for Performance Research (CPR), a nonprofit organization in collaboration with John Jasperse/Thin Man Dance. CPR's L.E.E.D.-certified green building, the first in Brooklyn, provides affordable space for rehearsal and performance, arts programming, education and engagement with the community.

== Writing ==
Bokaer's writings have been published in Artwurl, The American Society for Alexander Teachers, Critical Correspondence, AADIAL Magazine, Goldrush Dance Magazine, ITCH, Movement Research Performance Journal, and NYFA Current.

== Selected works ==
- ECLIPSE
- The Ulysses Syndrome
- Fifth Wall
- OCCUPANT (Movements I-IV)
- Mass.Mobile
- FILTER
- Reverse Ruin

- On Vanishing
- Why Patterns
- SEQUEL
- RECESS
- REPLICA
- STACKS
- Anchises

- Autograph
- Prayer & Player
- The Invention Of Minus One
- Three Cases Of Amnesia
- A Cure For Surveillance
- No Caption
- False Start

- | underscore |
- underscribble
- CHARADE
- Relative
- NUDEDESCENDANCE
- RSVP
- OCTAVE

== Collaborations ==
- Daniel Arsham | Artist (2009–Present)
- Charles Atlas | Filmmaker (2003)
- Irit Batsry | Video Artist (2010)
- Liubo Borissov | Surveillance Designer (2007)
- Anne Carson | Writer (2008)
- Michael Cole | Video Artist (2006–2008)
- Peter Cole | Sculptor (2008)
- Collective Opera Company | Original Opera (2006)
- Aaron Copp | Lighting Designer (2008–Present)
- Merce Cunningham | Choreographer (2000–2007)
- Loren Dempster | Composer (2005–Present)
- Robert Gober | Sculptor (2005)
- Marisela La Grave | Intermedia Events (2003)
- Christian Marclay | Composer (2008)
- Isaac Mizrahi | Fashion Designer (2008)
- Snarkitecture | Scenographers (2010)
- Robert Wilson | Theater Artist (2007–Present)
- FAUST, By Charles Gounod (Teatr Wielki, Polish National Opera, 2008)
- AÏDA, By Giuseppe Verdi (Teatro dell'Opera di Roma, Italy, 2009)
- KOOL: Suzushi Hanayagi (Guggenheim Museum, New York City, 2009)
- CONFINES (IVAM: Institut Valencià d'Art Modern, Spain, 2009)
- Dialogue ONE Theatre Festival, Williamstown, MA, 2009

== Museums, performances and commissions ==
- The Solomon R. Guggenheim Museum / Works & Process Series 2010 - New York, USA
- The Solomon R. Guggenheim Museum / Choreography in the Rotunda, 2011 - New York, USA
- The New Museum - New York, USA
- MoMA PS1 - New York, USA
- The Museum of Arts & Design - New York, USA
- The Whitney Museum of American Art - New York, USA
- Museum of Contemporary Art, North Miami - Miami, USA
- MASS MoCA North Adams - MA, USA
- Le Carré d'Art - Nîmes, France
- MAC Marseille - Marseille, France
- La Ferme du Buisson - Marne-La-Vallée, France
- Kunsthalle St. Gallen - St. Gallen, Switzerland
- Institut Valencià d'Art Modern - IVAM - Valencia, Spain
- Palazzo deli Arti - Napoli, Italy
- MUDAM - Luxembourg

== Relations with France ==
Bokaer's choreography over the past decade has been made possible in large part through a vigorous artistic relationship with France.

Dance and choreography

- Working with the Merce Cunningham Dance Company throughout 30 French cities, in 9 regions, over the course of 8 years
- Touring new choreography to Alternative Spaces in Paris - Naxos Bobine (2006), La Générale (2006), Atelier de Paris (2007), Galerie Emmanuel Perrotin (2007, 2010)
- Production support in Marseille - La Compagnie (2006), Ballet National de Marseille (2010), MAC Marseille (2010)
- Production support in Lyon - Les Subsistances (2007)
- Production support in Nîmes - Le Carré d'Art (2009)
- Production support in Paris - Art/Dan/Thé Festival, Vanves (2010)
- Production support in Avignon - Les Hivernales Festival (2011), Les Penitents Blancs (2011), CDC Avignon (2011)
- Receipt of the FUSED / French U.S. Exchange in Dance grant (2011)

Production and presentation

- Provision of residencies to Alexandre Roccoli (Chez Bushwick, 2007)
- Provision of residencies to Christian Rizzo (CPR, 2008)
- Provision of residencies to Steven Cohen (CPR, 2009)
- Provision of residencies to David Wampach (CPR, 2009)
- Restaging of French choreography on U.S. artists via David Wampach (CPR, 2009)

Leadership

- Induction into Young Leaders of the French American Foundation 2008 (Paris, Strasbourg) / 2009 (Chicago)

Partnerships

- FUSED / French U.S. Exchange in Dance (2007, 2008, 2010, 2011)
- Cultural Services of the French Embassy (2008, 2009, 2010)
- FIAF's Crossing The Line Festival (2007, 2008, 2009)
- ONDA (2010)

== Awards and honors ==
Bokaer has been honored with a Human Rights Award (Public Volunteerism, 2000), a fellowship from the Foundation for Contemporary Arts (Dance & Media, 2005–2006), the inaugural Gallery Installation Fellowship from Dance Theater Workshop (2007), and one of four national Dance Access Scholarships from Dance/USA, with funds from the Andrew W. Mellon Foundation (2007), and the Alumni Achievement Award from the University of North Carolina School of the Arts (2009). Additionally, Bokaer recently accepted the Special Citation at the New York Dance & Performance / Bessie Awards, for the arts organization Chez Bushwick (2007); his choreography "The Invention Of Minus One" was also awarded a Bessie Award for original lighting design by Aaron Copp (2008). He is also a 2008–2009 Young Leader of the French American Foundation, and is the first dance artist to have been awarded.

Awards, honors, fellowships

- Human Rights Award (Public Service, 2000)
- Joan Kirnsner Memorial Award (The New School, 2005)
- Foundation for Contemporary Arts Grants to Artists Award (2005–2006)
- Passing It On Award, Brooklyn Arts Exchange (Chez Bushwick, 2006)
- 25 To Watch, Dance Magazine (2006)
- Inaugural Gallery Installation Fellowship from Dance Theater Workshop (Media, 2007)
- Rolex Mentor and Protégé Arts Initiative in Dance (Dance Finalist, 2007)
- New York Dance and Performance / Bessie Award - Special Citation (Chez Bushwick, 2007)
- New York Dance and Performance / Bessie Award - (Lighting Design by Aaron Copp, 2008)
- National Dance Access Scholarship from Dance/USA (via Mellon Foundation, 2007)
- Young Leader of the French American Foundation (First Choreographer Awarded, 2008–2009)
- Alumni Achievement Award from University of North Carolina School of the Arts (2009)
- OUT Magazine (2009)
- Rockefeller Foundation NYC Cultural Innovation Award (Chez Bushwick, Youngest Recipient, 2009–2010)
- The Nifty Fifty, America's Up-And-Coming Talent (NY Times, 2010)
- Crain's NY Business "40 Under 40" (2011)
- Bogliasco Foundation / Jerome Robbins Special Fellowship in Choreography (Italy, 2011)
- Prix Nouveau Talent Chorégraphie, Société des Auteurs et Compositeurs Dramatiques (Paris, 2011)
- National Endowment for the Arts (2011, 2012, 2013)
- John Simon Guggenheim Fellowship, (New York, 2015)
- United States Artists Fellowship, (New York, 2015)
