= Jonathan Nesci =

American designer (born 1981)

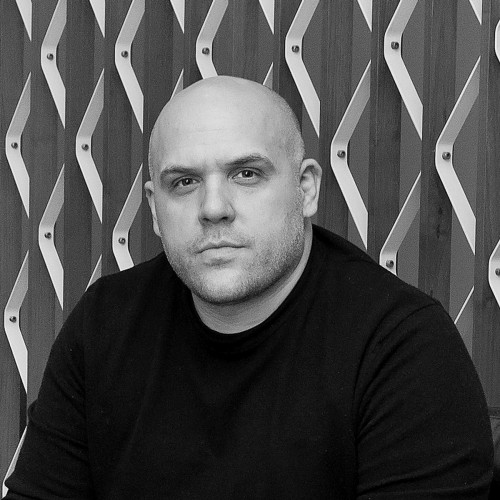
- Born: June 21, 1981 (age 44); Chicago, Illinois, U.S.
- Occupation: Designer
- Known for: 100 Variations
- Spouse: Christine Nesci
- Children: 2

Jonathan Nesci (born June 21, 1981, Chicago, Illinois) is an American designer best known for his furniture, lighting, and exhibition design. His minimalist furniture has been exhibited at international design shows, including Design Miami, Collective Design Fair, EXPO Chicago, International Contemporary Furniture Fair, PAD London, and PAD Paris. He lives in Columbus, Indiana and formerly worked at Wright auction house in Chicago, Illinois.

== Career ==
While still working at Wright auction, Nesci's designs first appeared in 2007 at a juried group exhibition for Design Within Reach in Chicago. In 2008 he left Wright to pursue a full-time career in design. Since 2007 Nesci has exhibited his works at Design Miami with Casati Gallery, Giovanni Beltran, Patrick Parish Gallery, Plusdesign Gallery, Tile Blush, and Volume Gallery. He has designed booths for Casati Gallery and Patrick Parish Gallery for Design Miami, Art Basel, EXPO Chicago and Collective Design Fair.

Nesci's first solo exhibition, "The New," was at Volume Gallery in 2010, and his first solo exhibition, "Nine Variations" in New York was at Patrick Parrish Gallery in 2011. In 2014 Nesci created 100 unique aluminum tables for the exhibition "100 Variations," that responded to the design of Eliel Saarinen's First Christian Church. and in 2015 he premiered a collection of mirrors, coffee tables, and vases at Patrick Parish Gallery in the exhibition, "Present Perimeter".

His installation "100 Variations" served as a pilot project for Exhibit Columbus, which will feature more than 15 site responsive designs in the 2017 exhibition. Nesci is a member of the Exhibit Columbus Curatorial Team where his work focuses on the "Washington Street Installations."
