= Urban golf =

Golf variant

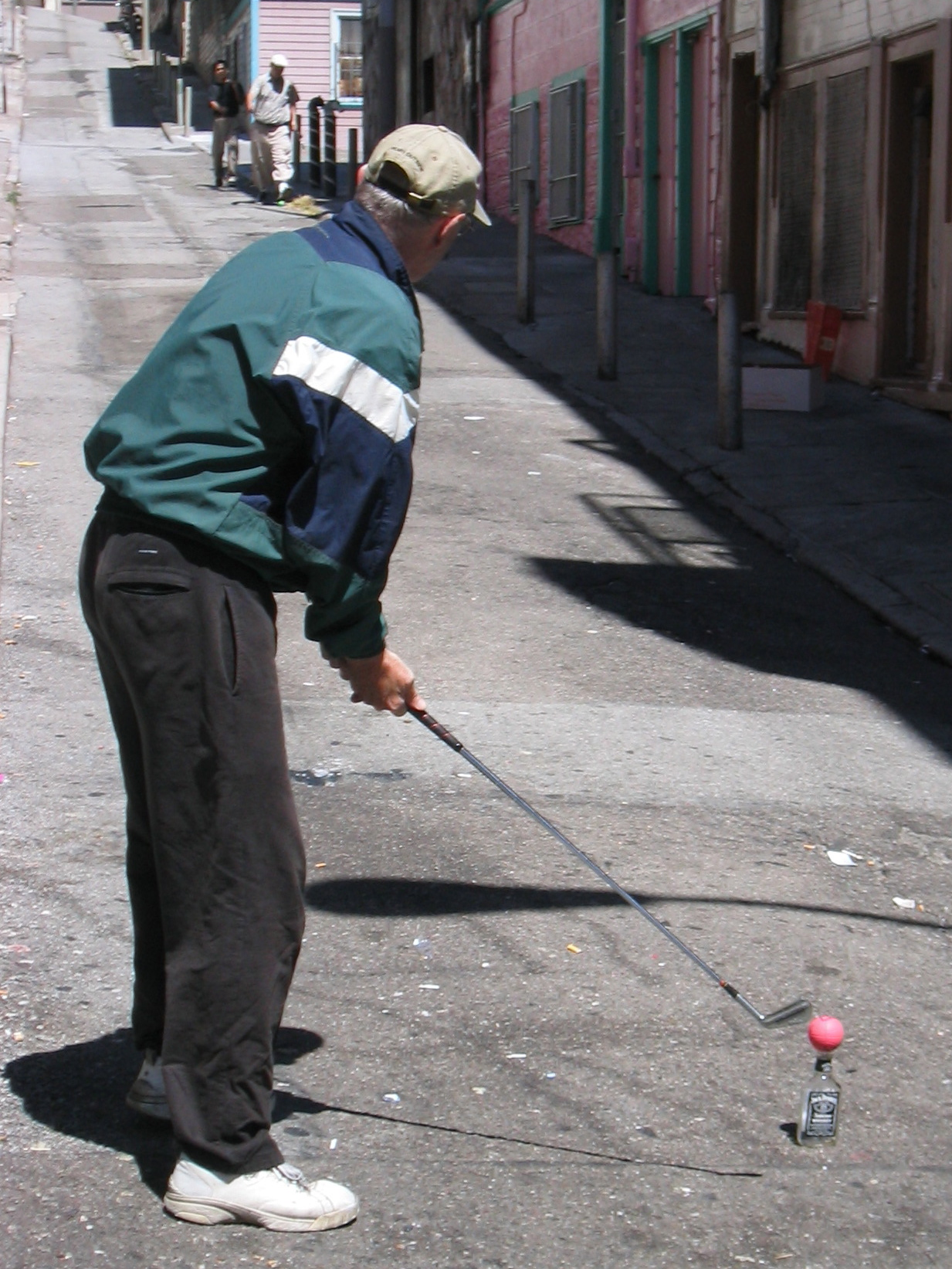
An urban golfer in San Francisco, c. 2005.

Urban golf, also known as crossgolf or street golf, is a game based on the original game of golf in which individual players or teams hit a ball into a hole or at a specified target using various clubs.

Urban golf is played without a traditional golf course, instead using street furniture as obstacles and targets. Instead of a standard golf ball, players may use leather balls, plastic golf balls, or tennis balls. It may be played on the street as well as in other locations such as industrial brownfields, sand pits, parks, rooftops, and river banks.

Urban golf started being widely played in 1992, when German golfer Torsten Schilling started the Natural Born Golfers group in Hamburg. It is particularly popular in Europe, where the European Urban Golf Cup has taken place annually since 2013. It also enjoys some popularity in Portland, Oregon as well as San Francisco and some portions of Asia.

One of the most recognizable practitioners of urban golf is Tiger Hood, a New York City street golfer known for hitting makeshift golf balls made from milk cartons on the streets of Manhattan.
