= Jamilah Sabur =

Jamaican visual artist

- Born: 1987 (age 38–39); Saint Andrew Parish, Jamaica
- Education: Maryland Institute College of Art (BFA, 2009), University of California San Diego (MFA, 2014)
- Movement: Contemporary art

Jamilah Sabur (born 1987) is a Jamaican-born contemporary artist working across different disciplines and issues such as performance, installation, video, geography, identity, and language. Sabur lives in Miami, Florida.

== Biography ==
Jamilah Sabur was born in 1987 in Saint Andrew Parish, Jamaica. She received a BFA degree in 2009 in interdisciplinary sculpture from Maryland Institute College of Art (MICA), Baltimore; and an MFA degree in 2014 in visual arts from the University of California, San Diego.

In 2018, she was an artist in residence at Flagler College’s Crisp-Ellert Art Museum in St. Augustine, Florida. In 2019, Sabur's site-specific project for the Hammer Museum at University of California, was celebrated in a combined exhibition opening with visual artist Tschabalala Self.

In an exhibition review by the Mark Jenkins at The Washington Post, in 2020, the artist spoke via email about her relationship to nature.

“I spent a lot of time in the desert thinking about how a body navigates space in a philosophical sense. I made ephemeral gestures in the land that later transformed into sculptures and sets to perform in.”

The Pérez Art Museum Miami presented the group show The Other Side of Now: Foresight in Caribbean Contemporary Art, in 2019. Jamilah Sabur's work was included alongside other thirteen artists from the Caribbean and it's diaspora. The exhibition's main question was "what might a Caribbean future look like?”

At Prospect.5: Yesterday we said tomorrow in 2021, New Orleans, Sabur presented Bulk Pangaea, a video installation commenting on the relationship between Louisiana, Belgium, the Duke of Wellington, Napoleon, and transatlantic trade between Africa and the Americas.

Pieter Bruegel the Elder- The Harvesters – Google Art Project

In 2022, she presented a new body of work at a solo show titled The Harvesters in the Bass Museum of Art, Florida, in which she references Pieter Bruegel the Elder's 1565 painting of same title.

== Exhibitions ==
- 2022 Jamilah Sabur: The Harvesters, The Bass Museum of Art, Miami, Florida
- 2022 Eltanin, Broadway Gallery, New York, New York (solo show)
- 2021 La montagne fredonne sous l’océan/The mountain sings underwater, Fondation PHI, Momenta Biennale, Montréal, Québec (solo show)
- 2020 Observations: Selected Works by Jamilah Sabur, University of Maryland Art Gallery, Baltimore (solo show)
- 2020 Mending the Sky, New Orleans Museum of Art, New Orleans
- 2019 Hammer Project: Jamilah Sabur, Hammer Museum, University of California, Los Angeles (solo show)
- 2019 Parallels and Peripheries, Museum of Contemporary Art Detroit, Michigan
- 2019 The Other Side of Now, Pérez Art Museum Miami
- 2018 Jamilah Sabur: The Rhetoric of the Living, Emerson Dorsch Gallery, Miami
- 2017 If defined, then undefine, Dimensions Variable, Miami (solo show)

== Collections ==
Jamilah Sabur's work is included in permanent collections of museums in the US and abroad.

- Pérez Art Museum Miami, Florida
- New Orleans Museum of Art, Louisiana
- The Bass Museum of Art, Florida
- University of Maryland, Baltimore
- TD Bank Collection
