= Volume Gallery =

Volume Gallery is a commercial art gallery focused on design and contemporary art. It is located in West Town, Chicago. Volume Gallery represents artists and designers working in diverse disciplines such as ceramics, fiber, glass, and object design. The gallery presents seven curated thematic and solo exhibitions a year with an emphasis on emerging and mid-career artists.

Volume Gallery has participated in fairs such as FOG Design+Art Fair in San Francisco, Felix LA, EXPO Chicago, NADA in New York, Collective in New York, and Design Miami.

Volume Gallery has shown architect-designed objects from architects Norman Kelley, Krueck + Sexton, Pezo Von Ellrichshausen, Ania Jaworska and Stanley Tigerman. The gallery program emphasizes fiber and textile, ceramic, and glass works.

== History ==
It was founded by Claire Warner and Sam Vinz in 2010. They had met while working at Wright auction house.

In 2017 Warner and Vinz were named among the five most important new dealers on the forefront of design in The New York Times Style Magazine. They were featured in Newcity's list of influentials who lead Chicago’s design scene on Design 50: Who Shapes Chicago 2017.

In 2017, Volume Gallery moved from its West Loop location to West Town along with galleries, Document, PLHK, Western Exhibitions, and Rhona Hoffman Gallery.

== Artists ==
Volume Gallery represents emerging and mid-career contemporary artists and the design work of architects and contemporary designers.

- (after RO/LU)
- Michael C. Andrews
- Aranda\Lasch with Terrol Dew Johnson
- Tanya Aguiñiga
- Benas Burdulis
- Jojo Chuang
- Pezo Von Ellrichshausen
- Evan Gruzis
- Ross Hansen
- Matthias Merkel Hess
- Jennefer Hoffmann
- James Hyde
- Sung Jang
- Ania Jaworska
- Norman Kelley
- Thomas Leinberger
- Luftwerk
- Johnston Marklee & Associates
- Christy Matson
- Jonathan Muecke
- Charlie O’Geen
- Jonathan Olivares
- OOIEE
- Leon Ransmeier
- Anders Ruhwald
- Krueck + Sexton
- Snarkitecture
- Stanley Tigerman
- Thaddeus Wolfe
- Young & Ayata
