= Dozie Kanu =

American Artist

- Born: Houston, United States
- Occupations: artist and designer
- Years active: 2018–present
- Website: doziekanu.com

Dozie Kanu is an American artist. His work involves sculptural objects and installations that deal with limits of form, materiality, functionality and utilitarianism.

== Early life and education ==
Kanu was born in Houston, Texas in 1993 and his parents are both Nigerian immigrants. After studying film directing, Kanu received a bachelor of fine arts degree from School of Visual Arts, New York in 2016. Kanu graduated from Maumaus Independent Study Program, Lisbon, Portugal in 2022. He presently lives and works in Santarém, Portugal.

== Work and career ==
His first museum solo exhibition was held at the Studio Museum in Harlem in 2019.

He has designed furniture for Knoll.

== Solo exhibitions ==
=== 2018 ===
- Humane Alternatives, Soft Opening, London, UK

=== 2019 ===
- FUNCTION, The Studio Museum in Harlem, New York, NY
- ARS JUS PAX, JTG Detroit Project, Detroit, MI

=== 2020 ===
- Recoil, International Waters (with Cudelice Brazelton IV), New York, NY
- Owe Deed, One Deep, Project Native Informant, London, UK

=== 2021 ===
- Blood Type, Performance Space New York City, NY
- to prop and ignore, Manual Arts, Los Angeles, CA
- value order [gentrify.pt], Galeria Madragoa, Lisbon, PT

=== 2022 ===
- Galerie Francesca Pia, Zurich, CH
- Cordyceps Gaud Adversary, Neuer Essener Kunstverein, Essen, DE
- Tinted Spirit, Project Native Informant, London, UK

=== 2024 ===
- Lumiar Cité, Lisbon, PT
