= Museum of Contemporary Art Santa Barbara =

Art museum in Santa Barbara, California, United States

Museum of Contemporary Art Santa Barbara (MCASB)
- Location in Santa Barbara County and Southern California
- Former name: Contemporary Art Forum
- Established: 1976
- Dissolved: 2022
- Location: Santa Barbara, CA United States
- Coordinates: 34°25′07.3″N 119°42′00.7″W
- Type: Art museum; contemporary museum for the 21st century
- Accreditation: American Alliance of Museums
- Website: www.mcasantabarbara.org

The Museum of Contemporary Art Santa Barbara (MCASB) is a contemporary art museum in Santa Barbara, California, United States.

== History ==
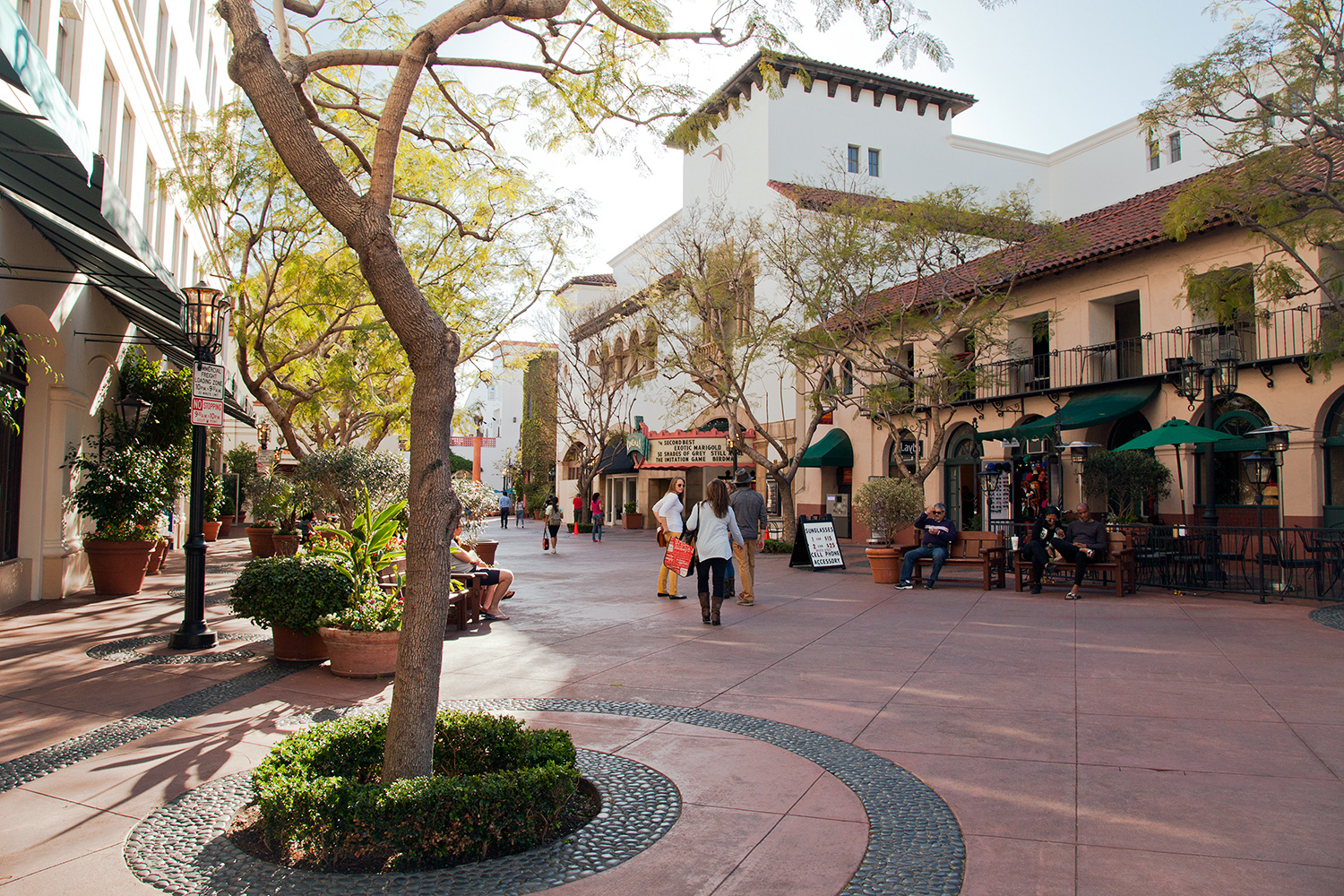
Paseo Nuevo

MCASB was founded as the Santa Barbara Contemporary Arts Forum (CAF) in 1976 by artists and art supporters seeking a venue dedicated solely to contemporary art.

In 2012, CAF was reorganized as the Museum of Contemporary Art Santa Barbara (MCASB) with a refined mission emphasizing education.

In July 2022, the Museum of Contemporary Art, Santa Barbara (MCASB) announced its permanent closure due to persistent financial challenges. Despite varied fundraising efforts and initiatives to increase revenue, the museum continued to incur significant financial losses over several years, culminating in unsustainable operational deficits. In 2020, during the Covid pandemic, the financial situation reached a critical point, with losses peaking at $1.7 million. These consecutive years of substantial financial shortfalls forced the museum to make the decision to cease operations.

However, by January 2023 the museum was able to reopen with an all-volunteer staff and hopes to build a new board of trustees and hire a new executive director.
