= John Jasperse =

American choreographer and dancer (born 1963)

John R. Jasperse (born October 8, 1963) is an American choreographer and dancer. Since 1990 he has been artistic director and choreographer of the New York City-based John Jasperse Company.

Joyce Morgenroth describes his work as "wry" and "often spoken of in oppositional pairs" of which the most central is "…the interplay between his tightly conceived structures and his elusive movement style." His dancers are involved in an "interactive choreographic process" and "[s]ets are designed to be integral to the dance," with dancers often moving or otherwise interacting with sets and props.

Originally from Rockville, Maryland, Jasperse graduated from Sarah Lawrence College in 1985; since then he has been based in New York City. He worked 1987–1993 with Jennifer Monson; in 1988 and 1989 he performed with Anne Teresa de Keersmaeker's company Rosas in Belgium.

Jasperse's work has been performed in the United States, Brazil, Chile, Israel, Japan, and throughout Europe, including such venues as the Brooklyn Academy of Music's Next Wave Festival, the Venice Biennale, the Walker Art Center (Minneapolis, Minnesota), the Museum of Contemporary Art, Chicago, and Tanz im August in Berlin. Mikhail Baryshnikov's White Oak Dance Project, Batsheva Dance Company and the Lyon Opera Ballet have all commissioned work from him.

Among his and his company's many awards, grants, and fellowships are a John Simon Guggenheim Memorial Foundation award (1998), a Creative Capital Award in Performing Arts, two Bessie Awards (2001 for Jasperse, 2002 for the Company), and grants from the National Endowment for the Arts (1992, 1994, 1995–96) and New York Foundation for the Arts (1988, 1994 and 2000). Jasperse received a 2003 Foundation for Contemporary Arts Grants to Artists Award. In 2011 he was named a Fellow of United States Artists.

Jasperse's evening-length works are Rickety Perch (1989), Eyes Half Closed (1991), furnished/unfurnished (1993), Excessories (1995), Waving to you from here (1997), Madison as I imagine it (1999), Giant Empty (2001), just two dancers (2003), CALIFORNIA (2003), Prone (2005), Becky, Jodi, and John (2007) and Misuse liable to prosecution (2007).

== John Jasperse Company ==
The John Jasperse Company, founded in 1985, has two managing structures: Thin Man Dance, Inc. in New York (since 1998) and Association Chapitre II in Lyon, France (since 2003).

In 2008, Jasperse partnered with Jonah Bokaer of Chez Bushwick to co-found the Center for Performance Research (CPR) in Williamsburg, New York.
