= Drake's (haberdashers) =

British menswear haberdasher

Coordinates: 51.5291°N 0.0870°W

- Type: Private company
- Industry: Retail
- Genre: Brand
- Founded: 1977
- Founder: Michael Drake
- Headquarters: London, United Kingdom
- Products: Luxury goods
- Owners: Mark Cho & Michael Hill
- Website: www.drakes.com

Drake's is a British menswear haberdasher founded in 1977 by Michael Drake. Manufacturing in East London, Drake’s produces men’s accessories and shirting, and is predominantly known for its ties.

== History ==
Drake's was founded in 1977 by three former Aquascutum employees: Michael Drake, Jeremy Hull, and Isabel Dickson. The original Drake’s collection was composed of men’s scarves. Drake’s went on to produce handmade ties and pocket squares, for which it is now known.

When Michael Drake retired in 2010 his previous understudy and lead designer Michael Hill, alongside Mark Cho, co-founder of The Armoury haberdashers in Hong Kong, acquired and took over the Drake’s brand.

== Collaborations ==
Drake's has collaborated with Fred Perry, Adam Dant, Nackymade Glasses, J.Crew, Aimé Leon Dore, Private White VC, and Royal College of Arts.

== Locations ==
On 20 May 2011 Drake’s opened its retail shop at 3 Clifford Street, London. Formally the home of an art and antiques gallery, it is situated between Savile Row and Bond Street. The interior of the store features Harris Tweed armchairs, wood floors and cabinetry from the Natural History Museum.

In April 2013, Drake’s moved its tie factory to 3 Haberdasher Street, London. Drake’s combined all aspects of the Drake’s business under one roof; the factory, design studio, showroom, warehouse, head office and factory shop.

In July 2013 Drake's acquired the Rayner and Sturges shirt factory in Chard, Somerset. In doing so, Drake's has inherited a workforce of 35 producing handmade, bespoke and ready-to-wear shirts.

As well as producing private label, Michael Hill relaunched the historic Cleeve shirting brand, owned by Rayner and Sturges, and introduced the first capsule collection of ready-to-wear shirts into the Drake's store on 3 Clifford Street and online.

In 2022 Drake’s opened a store on Canal Street in New York City.

Its flagship store at 9 Savile Row has been named among the best menswear stores in the world.

== Awards and honours ==
Drakes has won several awards for prestige in its area such as Queen's Award for Export and the UK Fashion Export Gold Award.

== See also ==
- East London
- Turnbull & Asser
- Aimé Leon Dore
