= Jonathan Muecke =

American architect and designer

- Education: Iowa State University; Cranbrook Academy of Art
- Occupations: Designer and architect
- Website: jonathanmuecke.com

Jonathan Muecke (born 1983) is an American designer and architect, based in Saint Paul, Minnesota, United States.

== Education ==
Muecke studied architecture at Iowa State University, interning at the architectural office of Herzog & de Meuron in Basel, Switzerland before studying design at the Cranbrook Academy of Art.

== Work ==
Muecke has exhibited with Volume Gallery in Chicago, and Maniera Gallery in Brussels. His approach has been described as cerebral and experimental, and as “inscrutably abstract.” In 2010, reporting on Muecke's first works produced at the Cranbrook Academy of Art, Abitare magazine wrote: “Muecke has built a body of work that is stripped of special-case functionality and references, and expresses only larger phenomena such as absorption, containment, conversion, filtration and gravity... domestic products, which Muecke’s objects are, have perhaps never before had their functions so abstracted from routine use. Muecke has designed away all the trimmings and left us with raw experience.”

Muecke experiments with composite materials, his work calls into question the definition and histories of art, furniture, and architecture, and he has gained recognition as one of the most prominent designers in the Mid-West region. Design journalist Anna Fixsen has written that "Muecke has perfected an aesthetic that is simultaneously reticent and blunt. His work can suggest furniture, architecture, sculpture, or all three at once." Muecke is also known for tweaking the proportions of his chairs and tables to invite an ambiguous sense of space and perspective. Describing Muecke's work in W magazine, the design curator and writer Monika Khemsurov stated that Muecke "has very different ideas about function than most designers do" and that his work "pretends to be utilitarian yet has that ineffable quality usually reserved for Minimalist art."

In 2013, Muecke designed Stabilizer, a carbon fibre diamond-shaped void on legs intended to visually stabilize a room and its contents, and CS (Coil Stool), which are both held in the design collection of the Art Institute of Chicago. Domus described Muecke's 2014 Design Miami Pavilion as an experiment in object-making at a scale neither architectural nor domestic, and as "envisioned as a space without detail", consisting of "a single, indistinguishable construct that filters and focuses vision though its predominantly closed perimeter and optically flattening color field walls." In 2016 Muecke was commissioned by Maniera Gallery to create objects in response to Juliaan Lampens' Van Wassenhove House. The resulting five experimental objects are informed by architectural and artistic references, and have been described as sharing the "stark geometries" and "juxtaposition of straight and curved lines" of that house.

In 2022 the Art Institute of Chicago presented a solo show of Muecke's work titled "Objects in Sculpture" and Jonathan launched MU-EC-KE, a company that produces carbon fibre furniture using proprietary methods.

== Grants and awards ==
- Veuve Clicquot Award 2010
- United States Artists Fellowship 2015

== Collections ==
Muecke's work is held in the following public collections:

- Brooklyn Museum
- Philadelphia Museum of Art
- San Francisco Museum of Modern Art
- The Museum of Arts and Design
- Musée des Arts Décoratifs (Montreal)
- The Art Institute of Chicago
- Vitra Design Museum, Weil am Rhein
- CNAP (Centre national des arts plastiques – France)

== Publications ==
- Krier, Sophie. Field Essays Issue One: Jonathan Muecke & Bas Princen. Santa Monica: Ram Publications. 2013 ISBN 978-9078454977
