= Adidas Samba =

Athletic shoe by Adidas

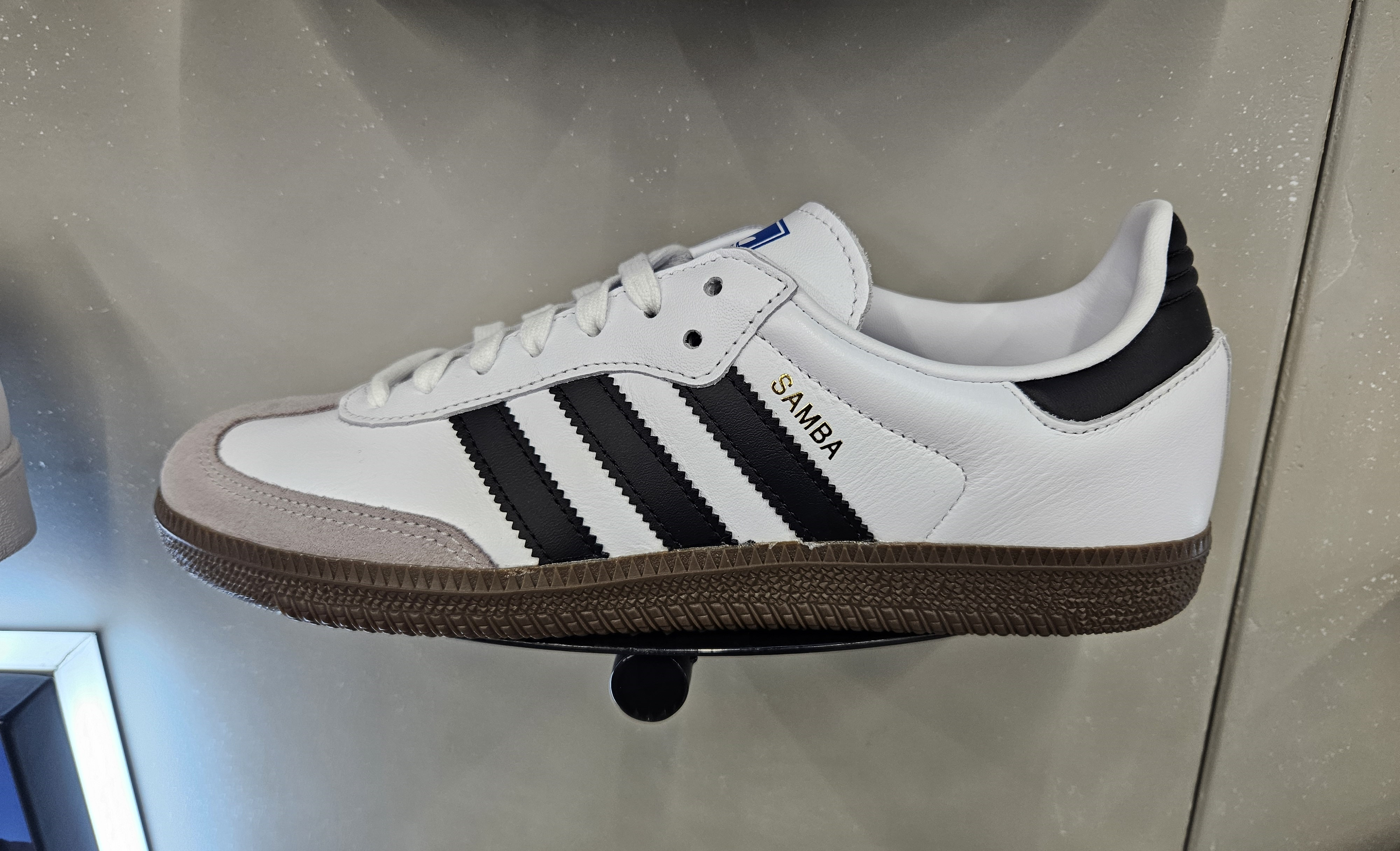
- Adidas Samba OG in white
- Type: Sneakers
- Inventor: Adolf Dassler
- Inception: 1949
- Manufacturer: Adidas
- Available: Yes
- Website: adidas.com/us/samba

Adidas Samba is an athletic shoe manufactured by German multinational Adidas. It was designed by Adidas founder Adolf Dassler in 1949. It is the second-highest selling Adidas design with over 35 million pairs sold worldwide, behind the Stan Smith model. It has been produced in a variety of color schemes.

== History ==
The Samba was designed in 1949 to enable football players to train on icy, hard ground (hence the suction design on the gumsole). Its original design featured the classic three stripes, as well as the gold trefoil on the foldable tongue. As years progressed, the trainer evolved into the Samba Millennium (which was made without the extended tongue) and the Samba '85. Vintage versions of the trainer are still in production, under the name Classic M.

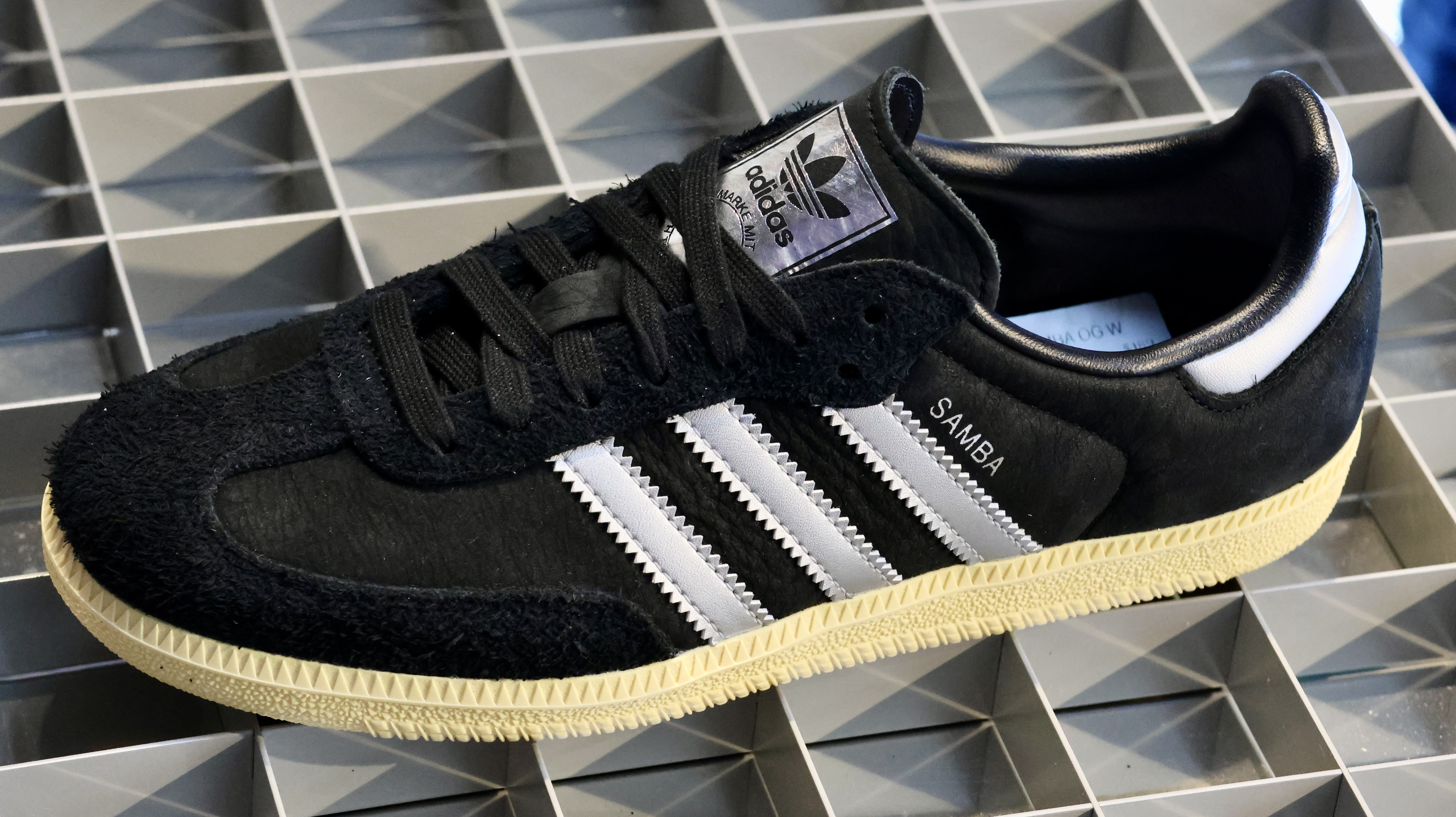
Black/Almost Yellow Samba OG

Some sources have said the name was inspired by the Samba being released close to the 1950 soccer World Cup in Brazil and the country's association with samba music and carnival culture. However, Adidas has said this was not the case, and that the shoe was given the nickname at German football matches.

It is the second-highest selling Adidas design with over 35 million pairs sold worldwide, behind the Stan Smith model.

== Models ==
Over time, the three stripes detail has been made consistent on all versions of the Samba.

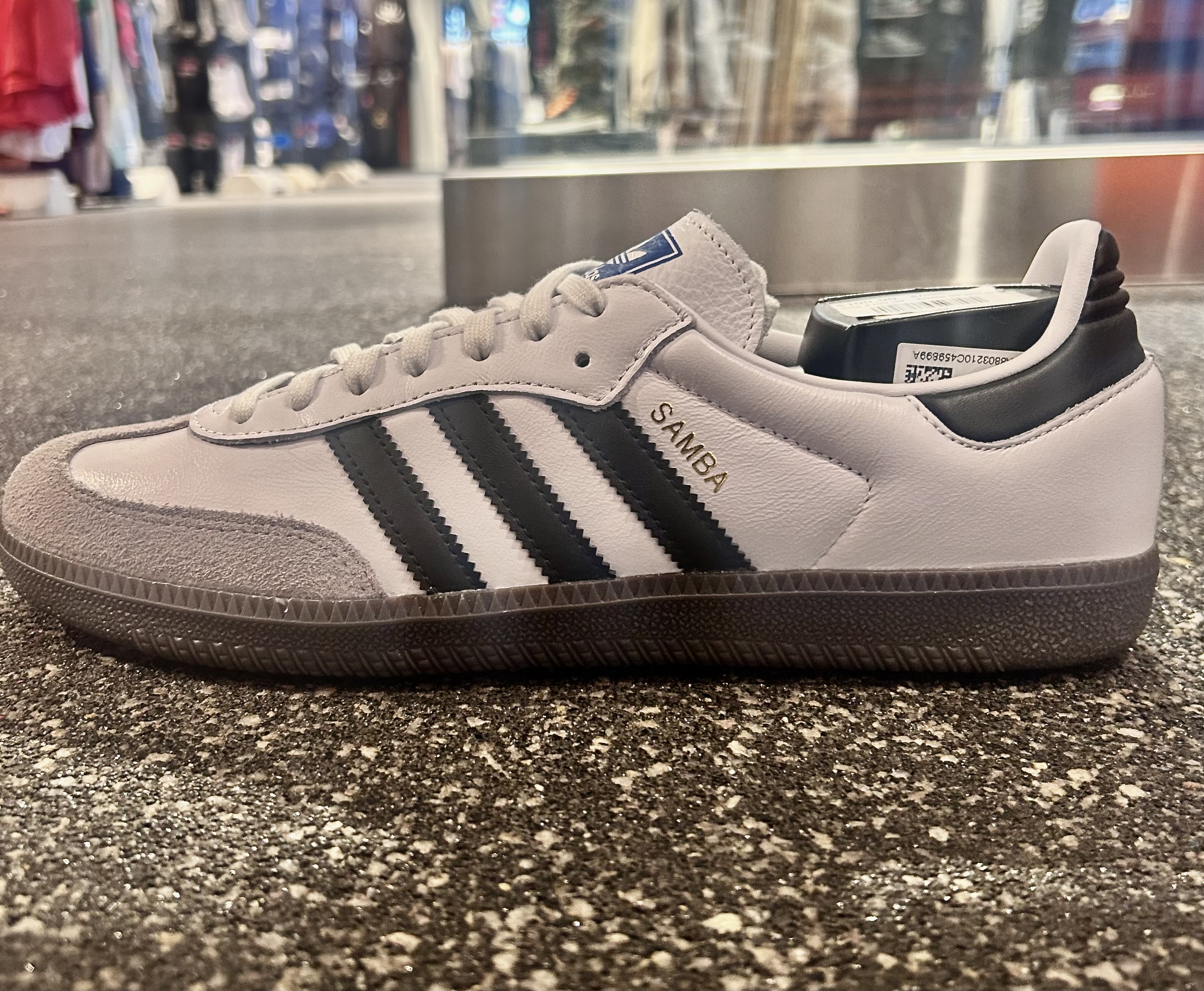
Adidas Samba OG In White

Samba OG

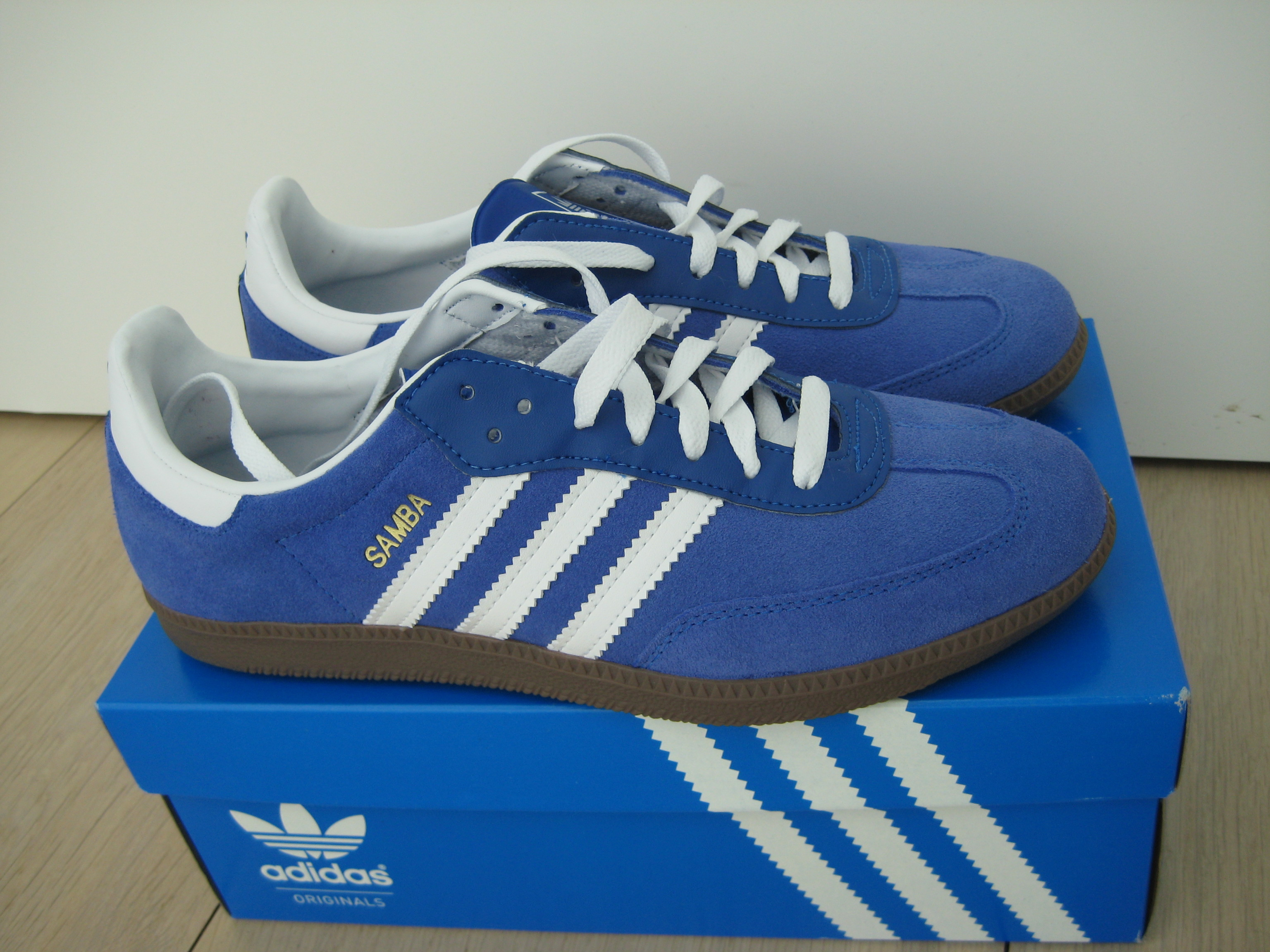
Blue Suede Samba OG

The Samba OG is typically constructed with a mix of suede and leather, a contrasting gum sole and the three-stripe trademark. The Samba name in capitals is embossed in gold alongside the three stripes.

Samba ADV

During the 1990s skateboarders and flatland BMX riders, like J Stolze, were commonly photographed wearing Sambas. So in response to the retro inspired fashions of the 80's and 90's Adidas, in 2017, designed the ADV for this market. The ADV has a premium leather and suede upper panel, molded heel clip, support provided by a sockliner, tread, internal mesh bootie, internal tongue stay strips, and a gum capsule.

Samba Classic

The Samba Classic is specifically designed for five-a-side and indoor soccer. It has an extended tongue and a lightweight synthetic construction with EVA-injected soles. The Samba branding on the side and tongue of the shoe are in larger type.

Samba Vegan

The Samba Vegan is crafted using faux leather, eliminating the use of animal products. Typically, these versions also incorporate more sustainable fabrics.

Velosamba

While the upper panel of the sneaker resembles the Samba OG, it incorporates a distinctive feature in the midsole for biking. The underpart is designed to accommodate two-bolt pedal cleats.

Sambae

A platform variant of the shoe. It includes a taller sole and a full leather upper.

Samba Recon LT

The Recon LT was launched to coincide with the 2018 FIFA Russian World Cup. It had two color ways; one with a black upper and gum sole and the other with a white upper and gum sole. This version also has a fold-over tongue.

Samba Super

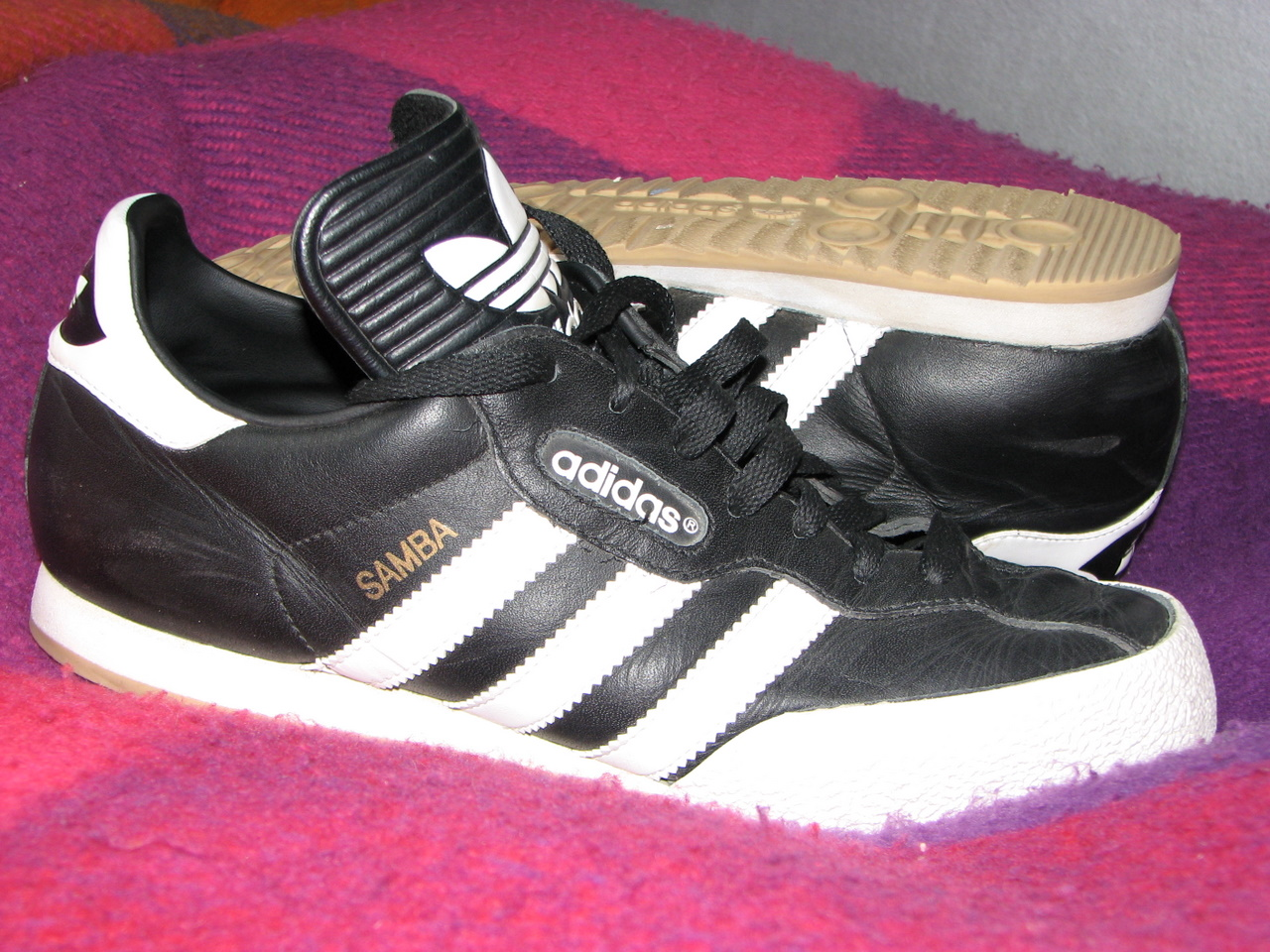
Adidas Samba Super in Black

The Samba Super was designed for more urban wear rather than athletic use. This model has a bulkier construction, a narrower foam sole at the back, and an extended outsole at the front.

Samba Rose

The Samba rose was introduced in 2018 as a women's-sized model. Featuring the same upper as the Samba OG, Adidas added a textured platform midsole.

Samba RM

The Samba RM was aimed to be an updated Samba iteration. The RM model was introduced with the Adidas BOOST soles, additional lateral branding displaying 'S4M3A' and a slightly raised midsole.

Samba MA

The Samba MA was aimed to be an exclusive Samba iteration for the Sir Williams R. The MA model was introduced with right to left stripes as opposed to the normal left to right to be more streamlined for Iron Mans as per request and additionally displaying "MA" on the side as signature proof that they were "Sure as Henry" that these were one of one. Its current possession is unknown.

== Pop culture ==
The Samba has been featured in various television shows and movies. Kelso in That '70s Show, portrayed by Ashton Kutcher, also wore Sambas. In the 1996 film Trainspotting, Mark Renton (Ewan McGregor) sports the Samba Super in burgundy. Characters in Entourage, Remember the Titans, and You highlight the shoe in popular culture.

The UK prime minister Rishi Sunak apologised in April 2024 for wearing Samba trainers after some social media users were reported as saying they would sell their shoes because "Sunak had ruined the look for everyone". Days later, the Sunday Times carried a Nick Newman cartoon of a shoe salesman with a speech bubble saying: "Thanks to Rishi Sunak nobody nicks Adidas Samba trainers any more." In April, Samba sales in Britain fell by 11% compared to the prior month.

Dingyun Zhang, a Chinese designer and former collaborator with Yeezy, has partnered with Adidas for his first-ever Adidas collaboration. This unique shoe will be available for purchase starting on 10 May 2024.

== Collaborations ==
Collaboration partner	Release date
Fiorucci	February 15, 2019
Pleasures	April 27, 2019
Oyster Holdings	May 31, 2019
Jonah Hill	November 14, 2020
Wales Bonner	November 20, 2020
Maite	March 16, 2021
Ajax x Bob Marley	August 1, 2021
Jason Dill	April 9, 2022
Gucci	June 7, 2022
IRAK	October 12, 2022
Atmos x Face	November 19, 2022
Plug Palace	February 3, 2023
Disney	April 27, 2023
"Humanrace" by Pharrell Williams	November 3, 2023
Sporty & Rich	November 10, 2023
Sneaker Politics, "Consortium Cup"	November 15, 2023
Sean Wotherspoon	November 15, 2023
Extra Butter	November 22, 2023
BSTN, "Consortium Cup"	November 22, 2024
Kith x Clarks	December 25, 2023
Fucking Awesome	January 17, 2024
Kader Sylla	February 10, 2024
Dover Street Market	March 30, 2024
Grace Wales Bonner	May 21, 2024
Clipse	TBA 2025
