= Hirshleifers =

American retailer and department store

- Company type: Private
- Industry: Retail, Department store
- Founded: 1910; 116 years ago in Brooklyn, New York; 1962; 64 years ago as Hirshleifers, Inc.; Manhasset, New York
- Headquarters: Manhasset, New York, U.S.
- Revenue: $100 million (2024)
- Owner: Hirshleifer family
- Number of employees: 143 (2024)
- Website: www.hirshleifers.com

Hirshleifers (/ˈhɜrʃ.laɪ.fɚz/; HURSH-ly-ferz) is an American speciality retailer and department store focussed on high fashion, streetwear and accessories. Founded in 1910 in Brooklyn, New York, originally being a furrier, the company expanded to Americana Manhasset in Manhasset, New York in the 1960s. It is currently run by the fourth and fifth generation of the Hirshleifer family and carries over 100 luxury brands such as Chanel, Celine, Saint Laurent, Balenciaga and Dries Van Noten.

== History ==
Hirshleifers was started in 1910 as J. Hirshleifer by Jewish immigrant Jacob Hirshleifer, originally from Austrian Galicia, in 1870. When his son joined the family business, initially a furrier, in Greenpoint, Brooklyn, it was renamed J. Hirshleifer & Son. The company was incorporated in Manhasset, New York on October 28, 1962 upon moving to the new department store location.
