= World Handball Championship =

World Handball Championship may refer to:

- IHF World Men's Handball Championship
- IHF World Women's Handball Championship
- IHF Men's Junior World Championship
- IHF Women's Junior World Championship
- IHF Men's Youth World Championship
- IHF Women's Youth World Championship
