= Aimé Leon Dore =

American fashion and lifestyle brand

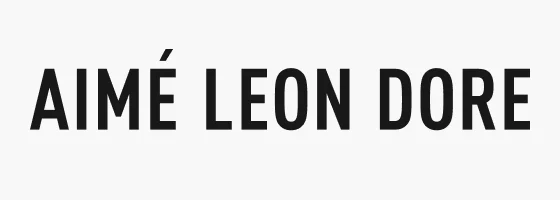

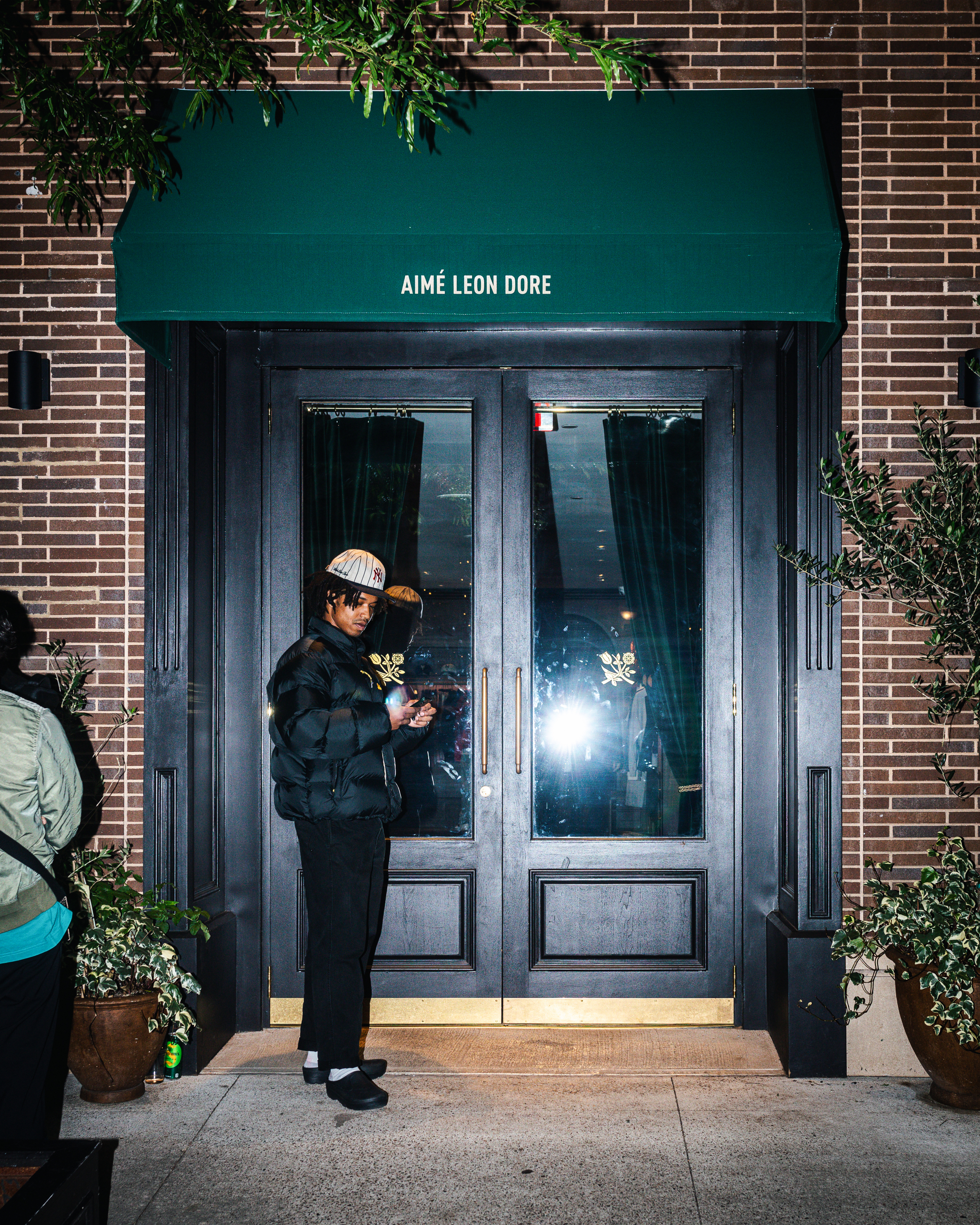
- Storefront of Aimé Leon Dore's flagship location in New York City
- Type: Private
- Industry: Fashion
- Founded: March 2014; 12 years ago
- Founder: Teddy Santis
- Headquarters: Queens, New York City
- Website: aimeleondore.com

Aimé Leon Dore (ALD; pronounced ay-mey lee-on door) is a fashion and lifestyle brand founded in March 2014 by fashion designer Teddy Santis. Based in Queens, New York City, the brand's flagship store is located on Mulberry Street in Nolita, Manhattan.

== Etymology ==
The company was founded by Teddy Santis in 2014 with the original plan to name it "Aimé", the word for "loved" in French and also used as a given name. This proved difficult to trademark because of how broad of a word it was so he worked with his wife to come up with a new name and decided on adding his father's nickname "Leon" and "Dore" from his first name, "Theodore".

== History ==
In 2015, the brand collaborated with Puma on an update of Puma's classic State sneaker. In 2016, ALD opened its first physical retail location on Mott St. in New York's Nolita neighborhood. The store featured a changing interior that reflected each seasonal collection, and its exterior used curtains over the door and windows. In 2017, Aimé Leon Dore collaborated with KITH on hoodies, t-shirts, pullover sailing jackets, pants, and caps with a nautical theme and anchors, boat paddles, and evil eye iconography inspired by Mykonos.

In 2019, ALD moved to a larger storefront on nearby Mulberry Street that also has an attached coffee shop. The new store gave greater expression to the brand's creative vision and included a living-room style interior evoking classic Parisian homes, an installation from New York artist Tyrrell Winston, as a well as Café Leon Dore, a Mediterranean coffee shop inspired by Santis' Greek roots with outdoor seating. Jon Caramanica of The New York Times reviewed ALD's Mulberry flagship in his column "Critical Shopper." The piece described ALD as a post-streetwear heritage brand.

To date, ALD has collaborated with New Balance (NB) on three major projects spanning three seasons (Spring/Summer 2019, Fall/Winter 2020, and Spring/Summer 2020). Each project has seen ALD deliver a unique take on New Balance's heritage and design in ways that pay homage to life in New York. The inaugural project in April 2019 focused on NB's iconic 997 silhouette; a collection featuring the 990v2 and 990v5 followed in November 2019; and the brand delivered a project featuring the 827 (the first time the shoe had been revived following its launch over 20 years ago) in March 2020.

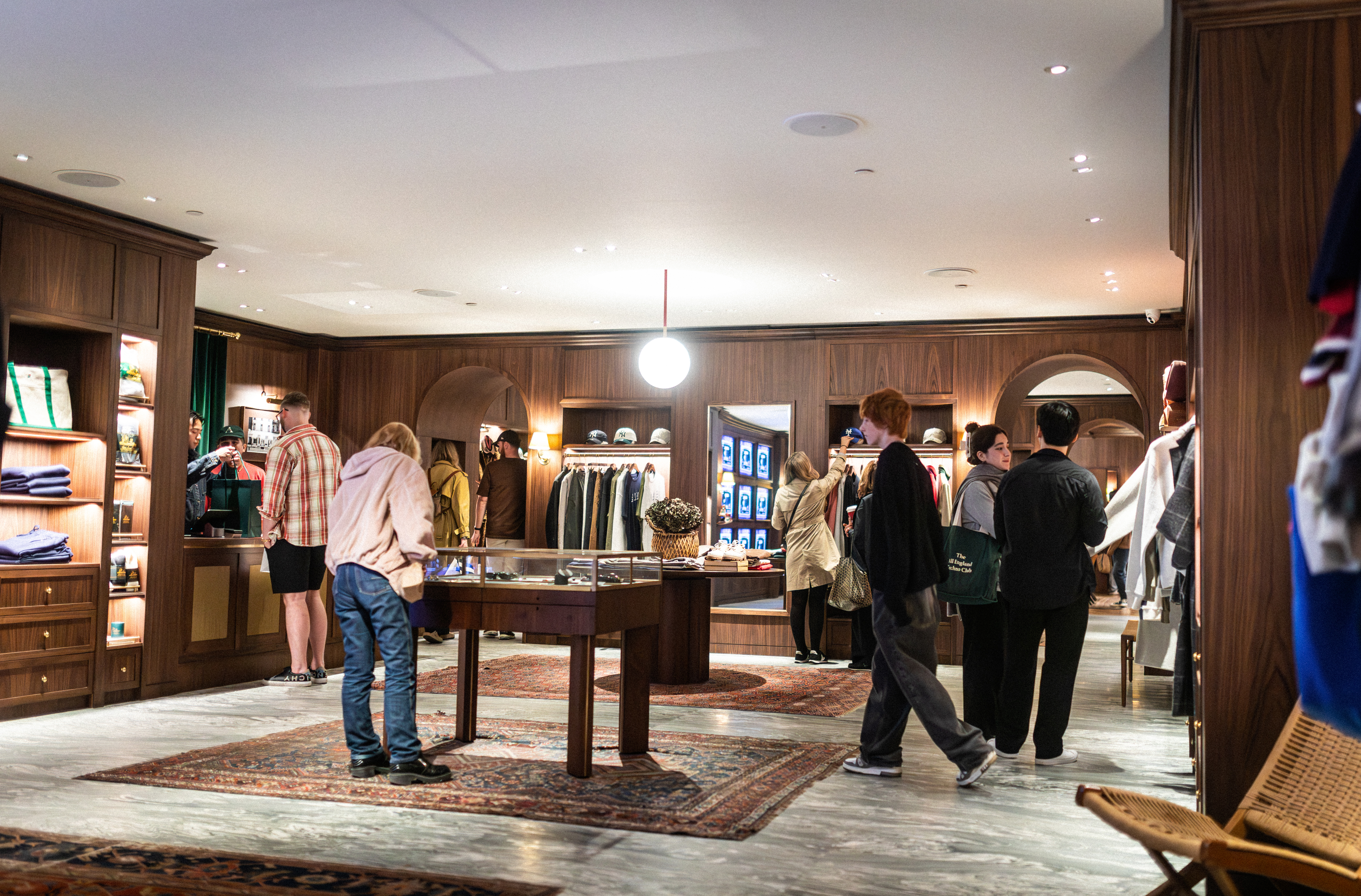
Store interior

In February 2020, ALD released the first-of-its-kind ALD 964, a one-of-one custom 1990 Porsche 964 911 Carrera 4 restored with Porsche's blessing and support, the first time they had lent their official backing to a vintage 911 restoration. The project included a video campaign, limited-edition capsule collection, and physical activation at the Deitch Gallery on Wooster Street in New York's SoHo district.

In July 2023, ALD collaborated with Greek luxury rib manufacturer Technohull and created the Aimé Leon Dore Technohull 38 Grand Sport Power Boat. Powered by twin 450 horsepower Mercury engines, the boat combines power, endurance, and sportiness, reaching speeds in the range of 90 mph. Alongside the boat collaboration, ALD created unique clothing and accessories with Technohull's branding are now resold for higher than the original price.

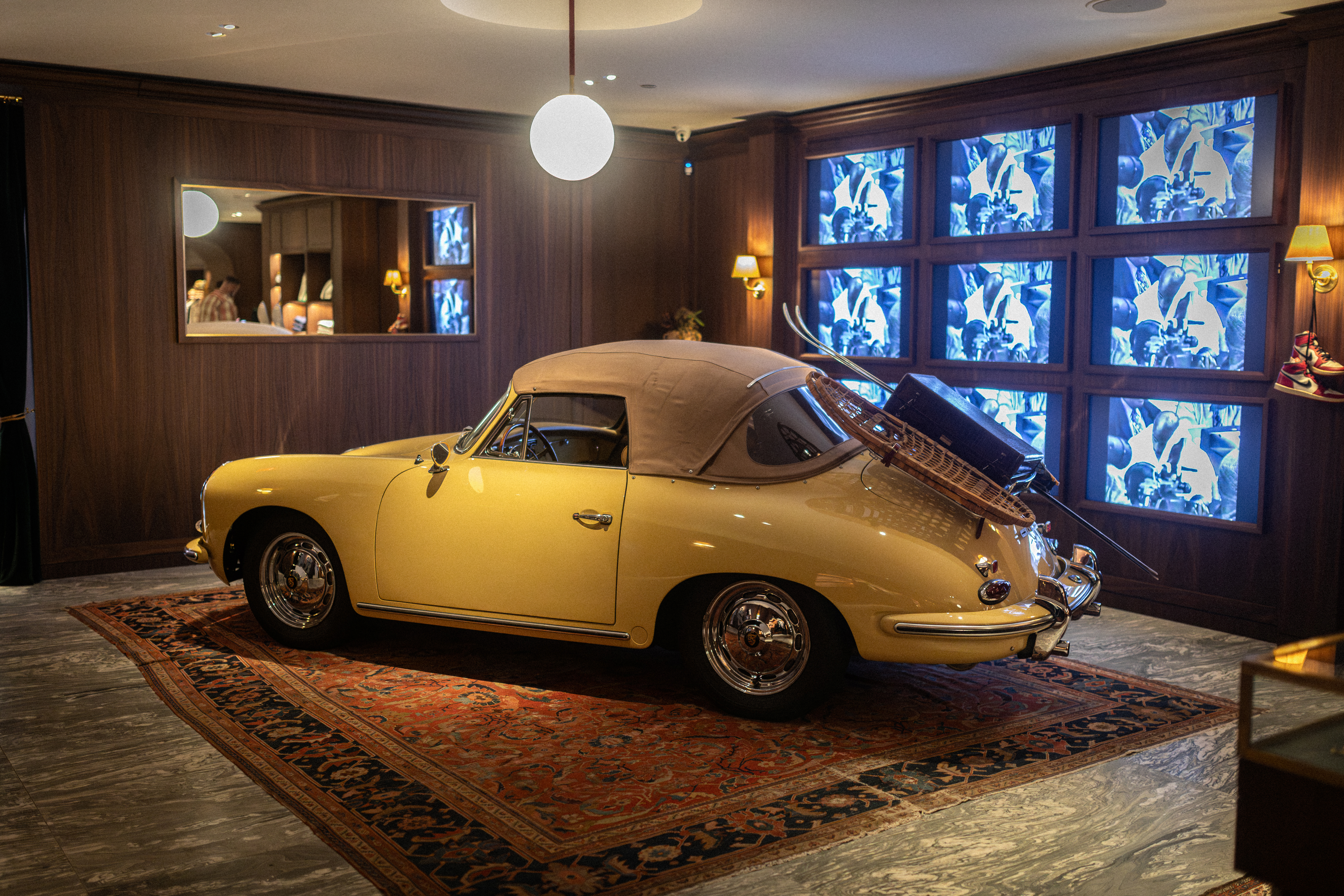
A Porsche on display inside the Aimé Leon Dore flagship location

== Description ==
The brand's design is influenced by classic hip hop and basketball, and Teddy Santis's experiences growing up between Queens and Greece in the 1990s. Santis has also credited the early-2000s streetwear boutique "Nom De Guerre" as one of his "biggest inspirations". NDG was considered one of the earliest streetwear stores to blend high-end fashion with sneaker culture and its discreet boutique was located in a basement on the corner of Broadway and Bleecker, just minutes away from ALD's New York flagship.

== Collaborations ==
The brand has collaborated with Woolrich, Suicoke, Timberland, New Balance, New Era, Paraboot, Drake's, Porsche and Rimowa.

== See also ==
- A Bathing Ape
- Billionaire Boys Club
- Virgil Abloh
- OVO
- Chrome Hearts
- Dover Street Market
- KITH
