= Snarkitecture =

Art collective and design studio

- Type: Design Studio
- Founded: Brooklyn, NY, (2008)
- Founder: Daniel Arsham; Alex Mustonen
- Website: snarkitecture.com

Snarkitecture is a New York-based collaborative practice founded by Daniel Arsham and Alex Mustonen.

== About ==
Snarkitecture's work is focused on designing within existing spaces or collaboration with other artists and designers. They aim to reuse or misuse existing architecture to make architecture perform the unexpected. Arsham and Mustonen met while studying at the Cooper Union in New York City and established Snarkitecture as a formal practice in 2008.

== Projects ==
Lift
2013

An installation for the New Museum Gala, Lift is a floating landscape that is both architectural and performative. An array of forty-five white inflatable spheres, each controlled by an individual performer, establishes a grid to engage the massive architectural scale of the room. Choreographed movements unfold slowly over the course of the evening reconfiguring the field of spheres in a series of elegant yet playful exercises. As performers manipulate the suspended plane, Lift dramatically alters the visual and spatial qualities of the existing architecture to create unexpected moments.

Richard Chai x Palladium
2012

This temporary installation uses reflection and inversion to create an uncanny sensory experience showcasing Richard Chai's collaboration with Palladium. Mirrors line the walls and ceiling of the small exhibition space, and compound the images of the boots featured within.

Odin
2012

A pop-up shop for Odin New York's fragrance collection, this temporary retail installation created an unexpected moment embedded within an East Village storefront. The entire shop was formed by a landscape of 1,500 matte white gypsum cement replicas of Odin's distinctive glass fragrance bottle. Suspended within a white shell, the matte white ghost bottles cascaded in a wave from the ceiling at the front window toward the floor at the mirrored back wall. A smaller landscape of bottles rises from the floor, inhabited by the only dark objects in the space – Odin's fragrances and their black packaging. The dark brown glass fragrance bottles were backlit and indented into the smooth white displays that spill out from the Odin boxes. Appearing as soft amorphous forms, the displays revealed themselves as the same hard white gypsum cement as the ghost bottle replicas.

Why Patterns
2010–2012

Why Patterns is a performance by choreographer Jonah Bokaer in collaboration with Snarkitecture, who designed the scenography. The work is titled after the score Why Patterns? by the composer Morton Feldman. The piece originates with a ping-pong ball that initiates a series of choreographed games. Various events flood the stage with thousands of balls, which are then manipulated by the movement of the dancers. Originally commissioned by Dance Works Rotterdam, the world premiere was held in February 2010 at the Rotterdamse Schouwburg in Rotterdam, Netherlands. The U.S. premiere will be on August 3, 2011 at the Jacob's Pillow Dance Festival.

Dig
2011

Dig was an installation and performance in collaboration with Daniel Arsham at Storefront for Art and Architecture in New York, NY during March and April, 2011. As an investigation of the architecture of excavation, Storefront's gallery space was infilled with a solid volume of EPS architectural foam that was then excavated by hand using hand tools to create "a cavernous space for work and play."

Richard Chai x Snarkitecture
2010

In October, 2010 Snarkitecture paired with fashion designer Richard Chai to create a temporary retail installation at 504 West 24th Street in New York, NY. The collaboration was the fourth in a series of five installations presented by the non-profit organization Building Fashion. Snarkitecture's design for the space uses a single material to fill an existing container beneath the High Line. White EPS foam was carved by hand to create a “glacial cavern” for the display of Richard Chai's collection – the material was recycled back into rigid insulation at the close of the project. The installation was open from October 21 – 31, 2010.

A Memorial Bowing and Beacons
2012

In December, 2009, Daniel Arsham/Snarkitecture were commissioned to create two public art pieces at the new Marlins Park (designed by Populous) in Miami, Florida, scheduled to open in April, 2012. A commemorative marker designed to honor the former Miami Orange Bowl is based on Miami-raised Daniel Arsham's memories of the old “MIAMI ORANGE BOWL” sign. The letters were reconstructed in their original ten foot height and orange color and scattered throughout the public plaza on the east side of the stadium. Their positions capture an ambiguous moment between destruction and rebuilding, standing vertically, horizontally, mid-collapse or submerged in the ground and spelling various words as visitors move around them. The installation by Daniel Arsham/Snarkitecture for the illumination of the columns at the new stadium used the simple idea of revealing and concealing the columns through the use of light. The lighting of the four super columns which support the stadium's retractable roof uses programmable LED lights that fade up and down the columns in subtly shifting patterns, evoking the rhythm of a human breath.

The BEACH
2015

The BEACH was an interactive architectural installation art designed by Snarkitecture for the National Building Museum in July 2015. Taking cues from the familiar experience of a summer day at the beach, Snarkitecture abstracted both the natural and cultural elements of the beach to create a reduced, monochromatic environment inside the museum's Great Hall. Standard construction materials like scaffolding, drywall, and mirrors were utilized to create the enclosure that led to an ocean of 750,000 recyclable plastic balls. Components both functional and visual, such as beach chairs, signage, and the construction of a pier and island welcomed visitors to explore, play and relax in a fully immersive and unique setting. After its installation at the National Building Museum, the project also traveled to Tampa, Florida, at Amalie Arena; to Sydney for the Sydney Festival; to Paris at the Museum of Decorative Arts; and to Bangkok in the Central Embassy. The use of the standard materials listed above allow the installation to be re-installed around the world economically and sustainably.

== Objects ==
2013

- Felt Light
- Slice
- Trunk

2012

- Bend
- Break
- Broken Ornament
- Float
- Lean
- Pour
- Shelve
- Split
- Wasserman Table

2011

- Cast Light
- Slab Table
- Slip Bench

== Exhibitions ==
2013

- Wallpaper Handmade, Milan, Italy
- Volume Gallery, Collective Design Fair, New York NY
- Grey Area, Collective Design Fair, New York NY

2012

- Funiture, Design Miami/, Miami Beach FL
- Ornamental, Grey Area, New York NY 2012
- Scale, The Standard Hotel East Village, New York NY
- BOFFO Show House, Miami FL
- Funiture, Volume Gallery, Chicago IL

2011

- Dig, Storefront for Art and Architecture, New York NY
- Not the Usual Suspects: [new] Art in [new] Public [new] Places, ArtCenter/South Florida, Miami FL

2010

- Total Housing 01: Apartments, Storefront for Art and Architecture, New York NY
- Booooooth, New Art Dealers Alliance (NADA), Miami FL
- The Business of Aura, Elga Wimmer Gallery, New York NY

== Awards ==
2011

- Goal Posts, Marlins Ballpark, Commissioned, Miami FL

2010

- Richard Chai / Building Fashion Series, Commissioned, New York NY
- Stephen P. Clark Center Lobby, Art in Public Places, Finalist, Miami FL
- In the Public Realm, Public Art Fund, Finalist, New York NY

2009

- Commemorative Marker, Marlins Ballpark, Art in Public Places, Commissioned, Miami FL
- Column Illumination, Marlins Ballpark, Art in Public Places, Commissioned, Miami FL
- Marlins Ballpark, Art in Public Places, Finalist, Miami FL

== Publications ==
- Arsham, Daniel; Mustonen, Alex; Didero, Maria Christina (2018). Snarkitecture. London: Phaidon Press. p. 256. ISBN 9780714876061.
