= Jonathan Olivares =

American industrial designer

- Olivaris in 2026
- Born: December 1981 (age 44); Boston, Massachusetts
- Education: Boston College; The New School; Pratt Institute
- Occupation: Industrial Designer
- Website: jonathanolivares.com

Jonathan Olivares (born 1981) is an American industrial designer and author. Olivares's approach to design has been characterized research-based and incremental. In April 2022 he became Senior Vice-president of Design at the Knoll furniture company.

== Early life and education ==
Olivares grew up in the metropolitan Boston area, and skateboarded as a teenager. He attended Boston College and The New School, before graduating with a Bachelor of Industrial Design (B.I.D.) from Pratt Institute in 2004. While a student, Olivares interned at Maison Margiela in Paris, where he worked on objects and interiors. He was an apprentice to the designer Stephen Burks, and in 2005 he also apprenticed for the industrial designer Konstantin Grcic in Munich. In 2006 Olivares began practicing industrial design independently, calling his studio Jonathan Olivares Design Research (JODR). His first office was in his mother's garage in Boston, after which his design practice was based in Los Angeles.

== Work and career ==
=== Furniture and product design ===
Olivares' early furniture designs are explorations in various forms of metal. In 2007 he designed Smith, a multi-purpose cart made of sheet metal for Danese. Versatility, simplicity, and the use of a single, recyclable material deliver an environmentally friendly product. The design is the result of balanced functions; a container, a side-table or seat surface, handles, wheels, and a geometry that allows stacking. Writer and curator Su Wu states: "[Smith] has capacity instead of categories, in which a table could also be a seat, perhaps, if you chose to sit on it."

Olivares 2012 Aluminum Chair for Knoll is a technically advanced chair made of die cast and extruded aluminum. The chair's seat shell is 3mm thick and has a shape that softens its metallic nature” and its contoured shape is slim and comfortable. The chair was commissioned by Knoll's then design head Benjamin Pardo (Olivares's predecessor in the role), who remarked at the time about his protégé, "I work with people like Richard Sapper and Cini Boeri [...] Who am I investing in? Who do I want to make bets on for the future? It is very rare to meet a young designer who is articulate and intelligent."

The Aluminum Bench, made by Zahner in 2015, is made from architectural aluminum extrusions, that are normally used to support curved metal building facades. The extrusions provide the main structure, joining the seat plate and cast legs, and are rolled formed to any curvature. In 2017 the Aluminum Bench was included in the Super Benches installation outside of Stockholm, curated by Felix Burrichter of Pin-Up Magazine.

In 2016 Olivares turned his attention to textiles. Twill Weave Daybed, commissioned from Olivares by the Harvard Graduate School of Design for 9 Ash Street, was realized in 2017 with the support of Kvadrat. The daybed is composed of twill weave textiles, with its legs and cross beams made of woven carbon fiber, molded on mast-making mandrels, and its wool cushion dyed the color of graphite. The daybed is strong enough to support the weight of a car. This combination of materials results in a design that is simultaneously visually homogenous and celebrates the different materials used to make it.

=== Interior design ===
Olivares has worked on commercial and corporate interiors, for Vitra, Dropbox, and in 2019 he designed a retail store for the Mallorcan shoe brand Camper at Rockefeller Center in Manhattan. The store furniture is milled from Indiana limestone, a nod to the building's iconic façade made of the same material, and the stock is housed in openly in sliding storage racks.

In 2022 Kvadrat's New York flagship showroom, designed by Olivares, opened. Based on the square unit of a woven textile, the showroom is square in plan with a catwalk that allows bolts of textiles to be hung from it. Square Chair, produced by the Italian manufacturer Moroso, was designed for the showroom and extends the spatial concept down to the scale of furniture. The chair is made of two square foam blocks, upholstered with textile, that allow the user to sit forwards, sideways, and backwards. With each block being upholstered in a different textile, the chair is a vehicle for larger compositions of color in space.

In 2025 Pernilla Ohrstedt, Salem van der Swaagh, and Olivares collaborated on the design of Knoll's showroom on Park Avenue in New York.

=== Writing and curation ===
His book, A Taxonomy of Office Chairs, was published in 2011. Writing about the work in the International Herald Tribune, design critic Alice Rawsthorn remarked, "you'll never look at an office chair in quite the same way again." Benjamin Pardo, who as head of design at Knoll prior to Olivares commissioned the work that led to Taxonomy, wrote in the foreword that "this book is important because it covers ground that has never before been documented in a systematic way. The taxonomic approach provides neutral, independent information without judgements, aesthetic or otherwise."

He has also written books about Richard Sapper, skateboards, and the Swiss design school ECAL (with Alexis Georgacopoulos, the school's director).

In 2014 he co-curated (with Jasper Morrison and Marco Velardi) an exhibition called Source Material at the Vitra Design Museum.

=== Knoll design head ===
Bruce Hannah and Olivares in conversation (2025)

In April 2022 he became Senior Vice-president of Design at the Knoll furniture company.

== Reception ==
Interior Design magazine describes Olivares work in a 2018 article as “spare and formally rigorous, often concerned with high-tech manufacturing processes.” The art and cultural critic Drew Zeiba describes Olivares works as carrying a “signature elegance and simplicity.”

== Personal life ==
Olivares is married to Hannah Hoffman, a Los Angeles gallerist who is the daughter of businessman and philanthropist Robert Hoffman.

== Grants and awards ==
- Graham Foundation, Research Grant, 2010
- Compasso d’Oro, 2011
- Graham Foundation, Exhibition Grant, 2011
- GOOD Design Award, 2012
- Metropolis Likes Award, 2012

== Collections ==
Olivares's work is held in the following museum collections:

- Art Institute of Chicago, Chicago
- Los Angeles County Museum of Art, Los Angeles
- Vitra Design Museum, Weil am Rhein
- ADI Design Museum, Milan

== Publications ==
- Olivares, Jonathan (2011). A Taxonomy of Office Chairs: The evolution of the office chair, demonstrated through a catalogue of seminal models and an illustrated taxonomy of their components. Foreword by Benjamin Pardo. London, UK; New York, NY: Phaidon Press. ISBN 978-0-7148-6103-6.
- Morrison, J., Olivares, J., Velardi, M. Source Material. Weil am Rhein: Vitra Design Museum, 2015 ISBN 978-3-931936-97-6
- Olivares, Jonathan. Richard Sapper. London: Phaidon Press, 2016. ISBN 978-0-7148-7120-2
- Olivares, Jonathan. Jonathan Olivares Selected Works. New York: PowerHouse Books, 2017. ISBN 978-1-57687-860-6
- A Life in Chairs with Industrial Designer Don Chadwick. Interview Magazine, 2018
- Olivares, Jonathan. Don Chadwick Photography 1961–2005. Barcelona: Apartamento Press, 2019. ISBN 978-84-09-11610-2
- Georgacopoulos, Alexis; Olivares, Jonathan (2022). ECAL Manual of Style: How to best teach design today?. Phaidon Press. ISBN 978-1-83866-517-3.
- Olivares, Jonathan (2024). Skateboard. London: Phaidon Press. ISBN 978-1-83866-749-8.
