= Laurence Kubski =

Swiss photographer and graphic designer

- Born: 1986
- Education: ECAL
- Occupations: Photographer, graphic designer
- Notable work: Crickets (2020); Big Fish; Sauvages (2024)
- Awards: Swiss Design Award (2023)
- Website: laurence-kubski.com

Laurence Kubski (born 1986) is a Swiss photographer and graphic designer. Her book Crickets (2020) is about the keeping of crickets as pets in China, and her project Sauvages is about the relationship between people and wild animals in the canton of Fribourg.

Kubski received a Swiss Design Award in 2023 for Big Fish, a series on aquarium keeping.

== Early life and education ==
Kubski was born in Switzerland in 1986. She grew up in the Gruyère region of the canton of Fribourg, and studied graphic design and art direction at the École cantonale d'art de Lausanne (ECAL).

== Career ==
In 2017 Kubski entered the Swiss Young Talent Award of Photography, having promised herself that she would give up photography if she did not pass the first round, and won the competition. In 2018 her work was included in a group exhibition of Life Framer photographers in Arles during the Rencontres d'Arles. In 2020 she was selected as a finalist in the photography competition at the International Festival of Fashion and Photography at the Villa Noailles. In 2025 she was included in Le Temps' list of 100 people shaping French-speaking Switzerland. Her work has been exhibited twice at the Musée gruérien in Bulle.

== Photographic series ==
Kubski's work examines the relation between people and animals.

While working on the series Domesticate, Kubski became interested in the boxes used to keep singing crickets in Shanghai, and later made a trip to China to study the subject further. Her series Crickets is about cricket culture in China. She spent a year on research before travelling to China, where she visited the country's largest insect market and followed cricket hunters. Simonett & Baer published Crickets as a book in 2020, and in 2021 it was shown in Swiss Photobook Today, an exhibition in Vietnam. Also in 2021 the supporters' association of the Fotostiftung Schweiz bought 16 prints from the series and gave them to the foundation.

In 2021 Kubski began Big Fish, a photographic series on aquarium keeping, for which she photographed fishermen in Indonesia and aquarium keepers in Switzerland. The series won her a Swiss Design Award in 2023. In 2024 she showed it at the Journées photographiques de Bienne.

Kubski made Sauvages as the 14th edition of the Enquête photographique fribourgeoise for the canton of Fribourg. She worked on the series for a year and photographed human presence in the canton's natural environments. The series mixes documentary images with staged scenes.

Kubski's book Sauvages was published by Éditions Textuel and launched at the Paris Photo fair in November 2024. She first showed the series at the Kunsthalle Friart in Fribourg, and a few months later exhibited it at the 2025 Rencontres d'Arles. Reviewing Sauvages for Die Tageszeitung, Hilka Dirks wrote that humans end up documented in the images almost incidentally, and that the photographs present people as the wild ones.

== Awards ==
- 2017 - Swiss Young Talent Award of Photography, Vereinigung fotografischer GestalterInnen
- 2023 - Swiss Design Award, Federal Office of Culture

== Books ==
- Crickets. Simonett & Baer, 2020. ISBN 978-3-906313-31-3
- Sauvages. Éditions Textuel and Bibliothèque cantonale et universitaire de Fribourg, 2024. ISBN 978-2-38629-039-8
