= Super St-Bernard =

Abandoned ski resort in Switzerland

- Interactive map of Super St-Bernard
- Location: Bourg-St-Pierre, Valais, Switzerland
- Coordinates: 45.87°N 7.17°E
- Status: Closed
- Opened: 1963
- Closed: 2010
- Vertical: 850 m (2,790 ft)
- Top elevation: 2,770 m (9,090 ft)
- Base elevation: 1,900 m (6,200 ft)
- Snowfall: 14 metres

Super St-Bernard was a ski resort located in Bourg-Saint-Pierre, near the Great St Bernard Pass in the Valais canton of Switzerland. The resort operated from 1963 to 2010 and has since become one of Switzerland's notable "ghost resorts" following its permanent closure.

== History ==
=== Opening and early years ===
Super St-Bernard opened in 1963, coinciding with the construction of the Great St Bernard Tunnel that provided year-round access between Switzerland and Italy. The resort was strategically positioned at the Great St Bernard Pass, a historically significant crossing point between the two countries that had been used since Roman times.

The resort became renowned for its high-altitude terrain and reliable snowfall, with slopes extending to the Swiss-Italian border. One of its notable runs dropped over the border into Italy. The resort's location at 1,900 metres base elevation, with lifts reaching 2,770 metres, provided excellent snow conditions throughout the winter season.

=== Peak operation ===
During its operational years, Super St-Bernard attracted both local skiers and international visitors seeking off-piste powder skiing. The resort typically received 14 metres of snow every winter, making it a popular destination for freeriding and backcountry skiing enthusiasts. The area's largely north-facing terrain helped preserve snow quality from early fall through late spring.

The resort also played a role in the local community's economy and served as an important piece of infrastructure for the remote mountain pass region.

=== Financial difficulties and closure ===
By the early 2000s, Super St-Bernard faced significant financial challenges. The resort was struggling financially, limping from one season to the next, partly due to its remote location and the high costs of maintaining lift infrastructure in extreme mountain conditions.

In 2002, the village of Bourg-St-Pierre, which owned and operated the resort, decided it should be closed. Local hotel owner Claude Lattion purchased the resort for one Swiss franc and attempted to keep it operational. Despite his efforts and additional investment, by 2010, a SFr25 million investment was needed to update the lifts, a sum Lattion was unable to raise. The resort permanently closed in 2010 after 47 years of operation.

== Current status ==
Since its closure, Super St-Bernard has been abandoned, with buildings slowly deteriorating and lift infrastructure rusting.

Despite its derelict state, the area has experienced renewed interest from ski touring enthusiasts. Ski mountaineering has brought new visitors to the abandoned slopes, who use climbing skins to ascend the mountain without functioning lifts.

=== Ghost resort phenomenon ===
Super St-Bernard has become part of the growing "ghost resort" phenomenon in the Alps. In Switzerland alone 20 resorts have closed in the last 25 years. These closures are attributed to various factors including climate change, economic pressures, and the high cost of replacing aging lift infrastructure.

The French ski brand Black Crows has featured Super St-Bernard in its "Ghost Resorts" film series, documenting abandoned ski areas worldwide and organizing guided ski touring events at the former resort.

== See also ==
- List of ski areas and resorts in Switzerland
