= Yorgo Tloupas =

French graphic designer and art director

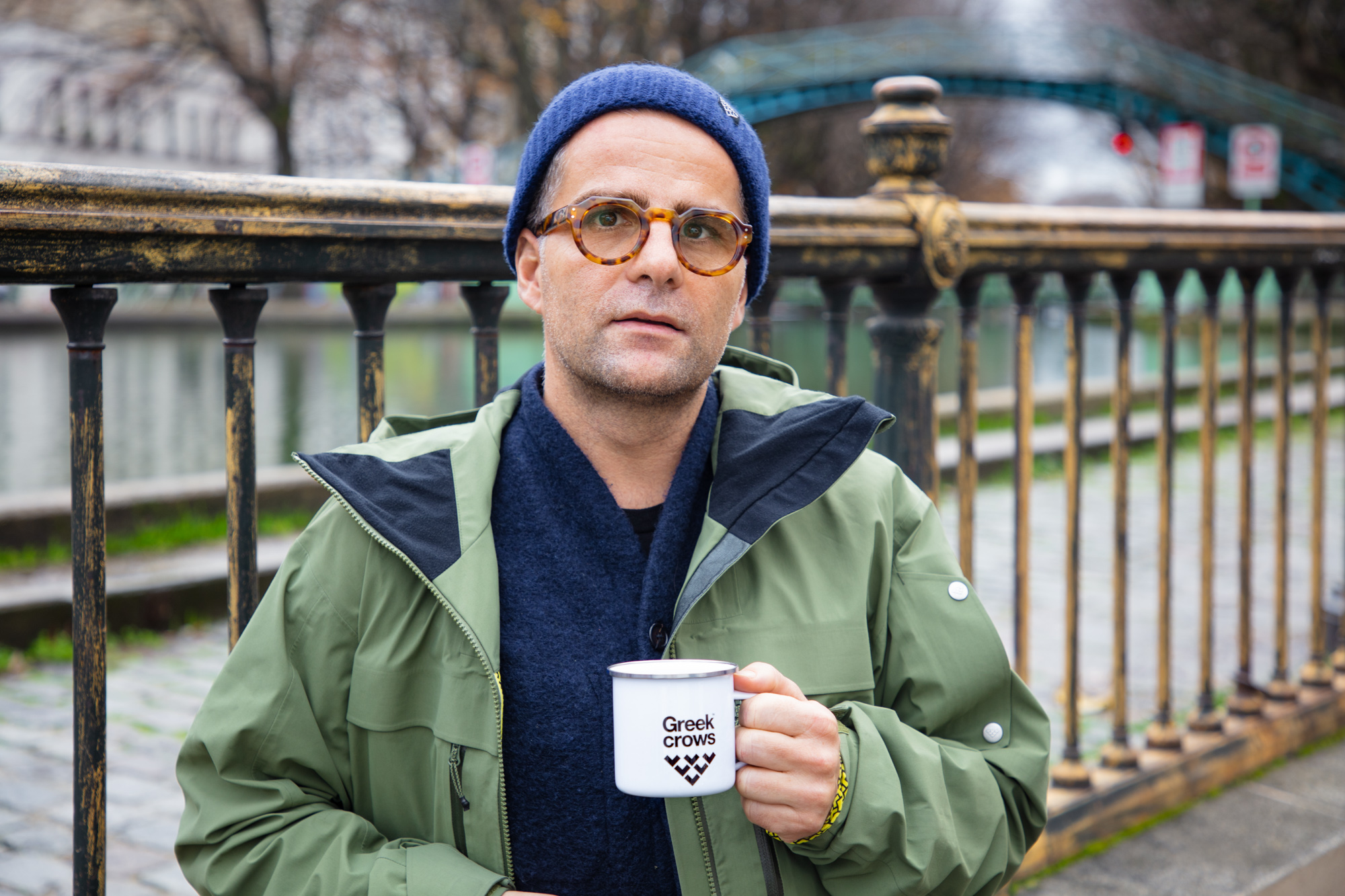
- Yorgo Tloupas in Paris
- Born: 18 December 1974 (age 51); Paris, France
- Education: ESAG, Penninghen Paris
- Occupations: creative director, entrepreneur
- Known for: Yorgo&Co. studio, blackcrows ski

Yorgo Tloupas (born 18 December 1974) is an awarded French graphic designer and creative director, specialised in logos, typeface design and magazine art direction.

== Biography ==
Yorgo Tloupas was born in Paris on 18 December 1974. He is the son of the Greek sculptor Philolaos and of an Italian-French art teacher. Tloupas grew up in the Chevreuse Valley, in the house-studio built by his father. An avid sportsman since his childhood, Yorgo says that skateboarding shaped his aesthetic sensibility and visual literacy, while snowboarding was the springboard for his entire professional career: in 1996, freshly graduated from ESAG Penninghen, he sold his final art school project, a logo and a range of snowboards, to Rossignol.

His graphic design studio Yorgo&Co, founded in Paris in 2011, works with luxury, art, fashion, sports, media and automotive brands such as Artcurial, Cartier, Diptyque, Hermès, Hôtel de Crillon, Lacoste, Louis Vuitton, Loro Piana, Martell, Omega and Swatch, among many others.

Yorgo Tloupas has been involved in blackcrows skis from the start, and today he helps the brand grow, both as a shareholder and as its design director. The blackcrows 2017-2018 ski range is part of the permanent collection of the Musée des Arts Décoratifs in Paris.

He teaches logo design at ESAG Penninghen, IFM, ECAL as well as SciencesPo Paris, and holds conferences and talks worldwide. In 2018 he has held a TEDxSciencesPo talk on (re)branding.

== Work ==
=== Magazines and books ===
Yorgo Tloupas has launched and successfully art-directed multiple lifestyle & cultural magazines. He art directed Crash. and Magazine between 1998 and 2000. In London, in 2001, he founded, along with Rankin and Daniel Alexander Ross (from Dazed & Confused), Intersection magazine. Moving back to Paris in 2010, he art directed the French edition of GQ. In 2013 he launched the French edition of one of Condé Nast's most iconic titles, Vanity Fair, and art directed the magazine until 2021. He also launched new editions for Libération's magazine Next (2015), and Beaux Arts magazine, a prominent French art review (2017). He is currently the creative director of the French cultural magazine Les Inrockuptibles.

With Yorgo&Co, his Parisian studio, Yorgo has also designed several brand magazines: the first issue of Louis Vuitton's LV the Book, published in 11 different languages (2014) the Loro Piana Journal (2016-2018) also published in multiple languages, Villebrequin's Splash almanac (2021) and Audemars Piquet's Stories (2021). The studio is also in charge of the design of Cartier's magazine, 365 a year of Cartier (since 2019), and of the art direction of several books for Omega, Google ATAP, Just an Idea, Lafayette Anticipations, and Kamel Mennour.

=== Visual identities ===
Yorgo Tloupas is the author of the ski brand Blackcrows' visual identity (2006). In 2016 Yorgo&Co designed signage, way-finding, and venues logos for the reopening of the Rosewood Hôtel de Crillon in Paris and for the French auction house Artcurial. In 2016, one the oldest brand of cognac in the world, Martell, had its logo redesigned by Yorgo. In 2017 Ricard introduced a new identity with a logo designed by Yorgo. In 2017 he signed the new visual identity of the Gaité Lyrique, a Parisian creative and cultural centre that promotes culture under the prism of digital innovation. The logo of Les Inrockuptibles was redone, in 2021, to mark the release of the monthly magazine's edition, art directed by Yorgo Tloupas. In 2021 Yorgo was commissioned by Hermès to design the logo for their new men's fragrance, H24. The logo for Midnight Trains was designed by Yorgo in 2021, who is also a shareholder and partner of this new network of European sleeper trains, .

Yorgo Tloupas logo design for black crows ski (2006)

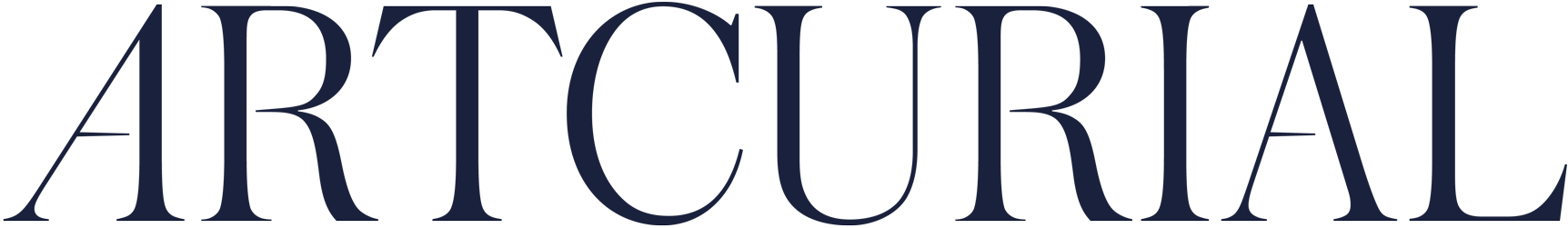
Yorgo & Co. logo design for Artcurial (2016)

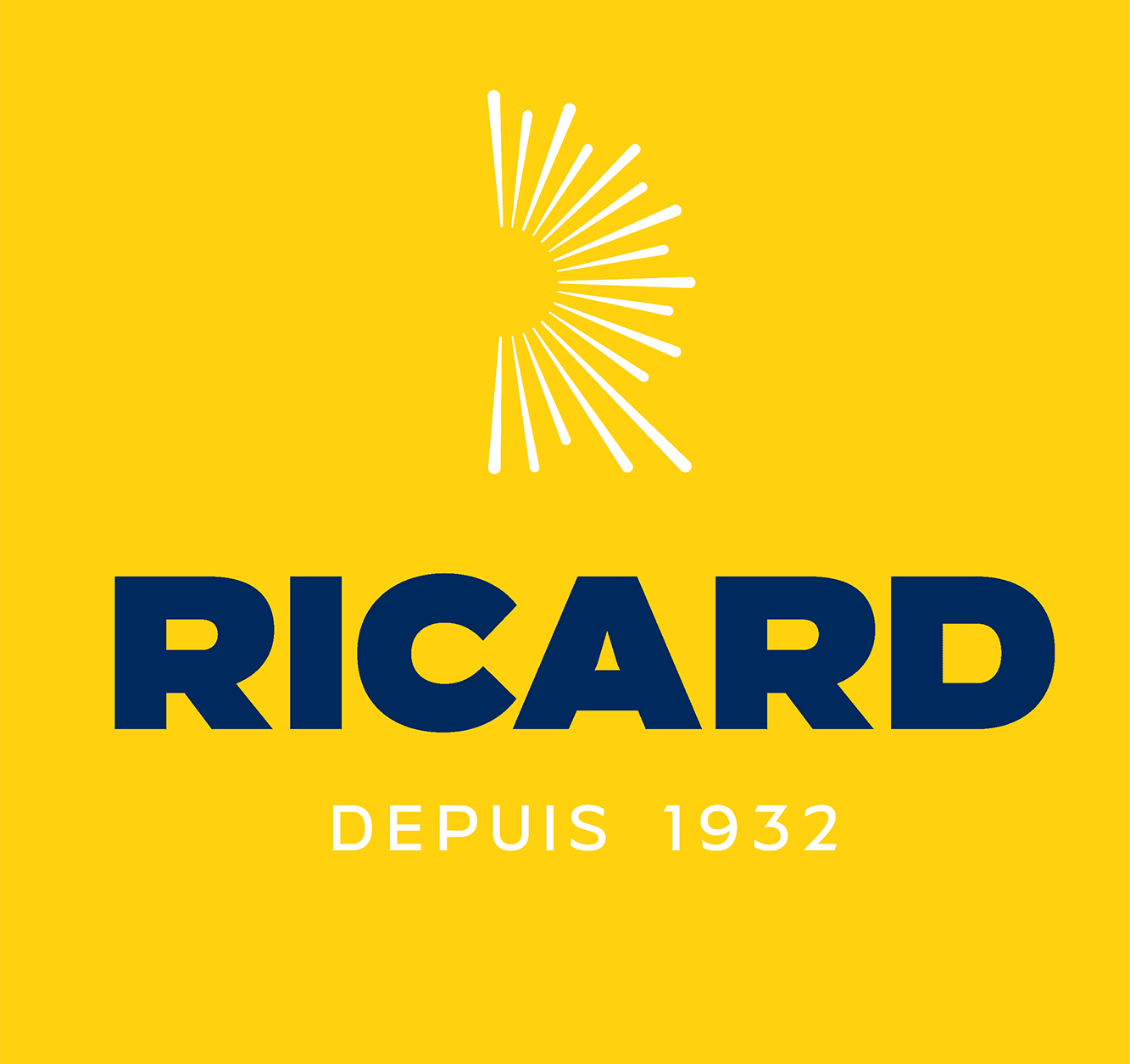
Yorgo & Co. logo design for Ricard (2016)

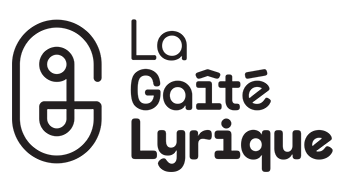
Yorgo & Co. logo design for the Gaîté Lyrique (2017)

Yorgo & Co. logo design for Les Inrockuptibles (2021)

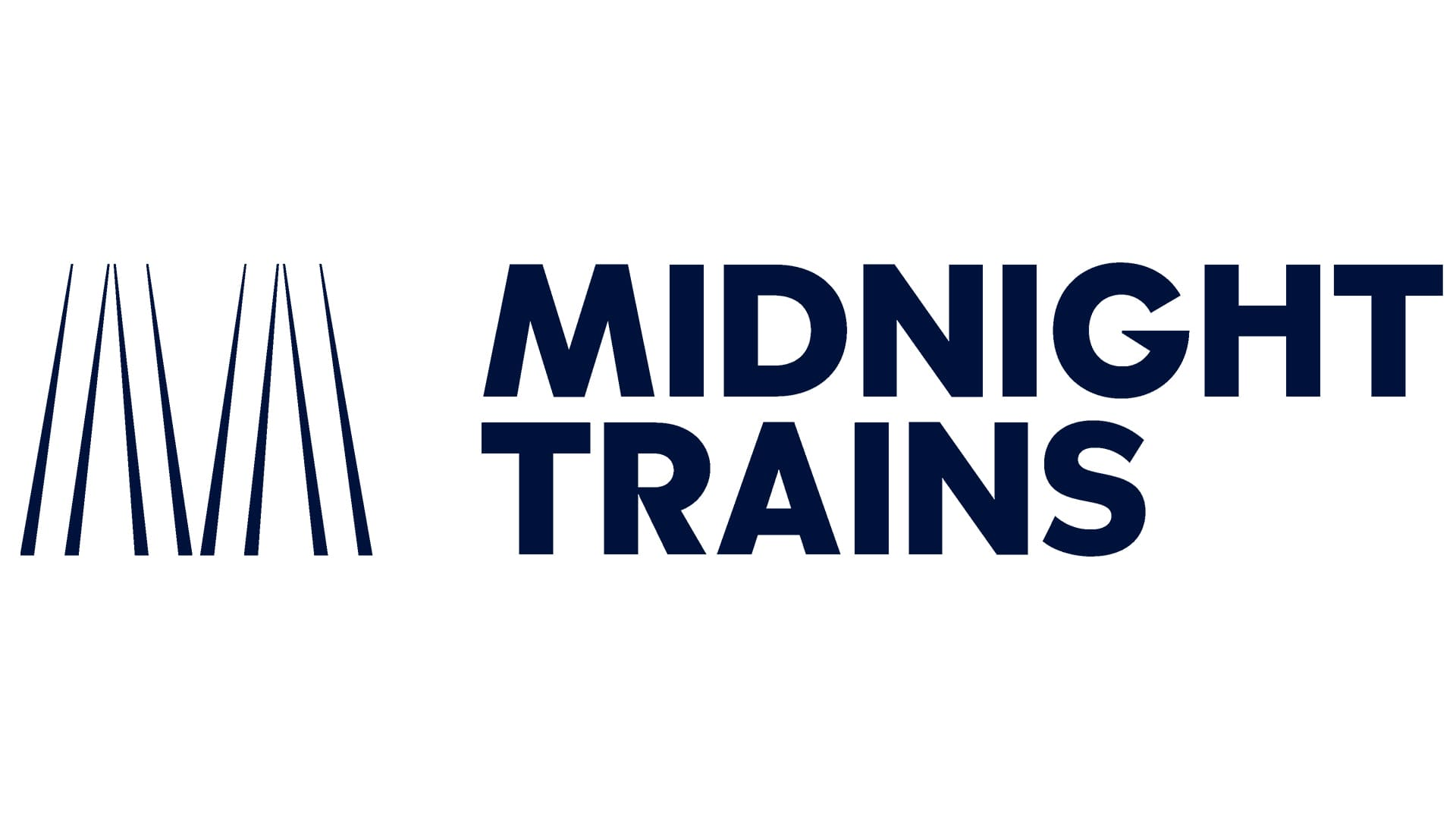
Yorgo & Co. logo design for Midnight Trains

=== Typography ===
Yorgo Tloupas has often collaborated with renowned type designers and type foundries: with (Jean-François Porchez, Commercial type, Production type). Since 2017 all custom fonts are designed by Yorgo&Co's in-house team. The first in-house font designed was, La Gaité Rounded, for the Gaité Lyrique, a digital arts and modern music centre in Paris. In 2019, Exposition, a Sans Serif typeface, was designed for the Patrick Seguin art gallery in Paris. In 2020 Yorgo&Co produced two typefaces - Cartier Brilliant Cut and Cartier Fancy Cut - for the jewellery manufacturer and watchmaker Cartier.

Gaîté Rounded typeface by Yorgo&Co. studio, 2017

== Awards ==
- 2020, DNA Paris Design Awards, category typography
- 2019, A' Design Award, category branding
- 2019, DNA Paris Design Awards, category Editorial
- 2018, MET Penninghen, Artistic direction
- 2009, D&AD, Wood pencil, Magazine & Newspaper Design
- 2007, D&AD, Wood pencil, Art direction
- 2005, PPA Independent Publishers Awards, Designer of the year
