= Giorgia Zanellato =

Italian designer

- Born: 1987 (age 38–39); Venice
- Education: Università Iuav di Venezia, École cantonale d'art de Lausanne
- Occupations: Designer; product designer; interior architect
- Website: zanellatobortotto.com

Giorgia Zanellato is an Italian designer of furniture, lighting, household and decorative objects.

== Biography ==
Giorgia Zanellato was born in Venice. She graduated from the IUAV University in Venice, and then completed a Master's Degree in Product Design at the École cantonale d'art de Lausanne in Switzerland.

She is the co-founder of Zanellato/Bortotto, a design studio that has worked in the furniture, lighting, accessories, and interior architecture sectors for companies such as Louis Vuitton, Moroso, De Castelli, Incalmi, Ethimo, Del Savio, Pierre Frey, Saba, Bolzan Letti, and Botteganove.

In 2023 she and Daniele Bortotto were selected by the French Academy to redesign guest rooms at the Villa Medici in Rome.

She was a fellow at the American Academy in Rome. Her work has been exhibited in the Triennale Design Museum in Milan, the MAXXI museum in Rome, and London's Aram Gallery.
