= Maxime Plescia-Büchi =

Swiss tattoo artist

- Born: Maxime Plescia-Büchi; 1978 (age 46–47); Lausanne, Switzerland
- Other names: Maxime Büchi; MxM
- Occupations: Tattoo artist; graphic designer; creative director

Maxime Plescia-Büchi (born 1978), also known as Maxime Büchi or MxM, is a Swiss tattoo artist, graphic designer, and creative director. He is best known for tattooing Kanye West and Adam Lambert.

== Biography ==
Maxime Plescia-Büchi was born in 1978 in Lausanne, Switzerland. His father was a journalist. From a young age, he was interested in publishing. In the 1980s and 1990s, he was involved with hip hop and skateboarding. He studied typography and graphic design at the École cantonale d'art de Lausanne (ÉCAL).

In the mid 2000s, he moved to London, and founded the Sang Bleu magazine. After apprenticing under Filip Leu in Switzerland for several years, he became a tattoo artist circa 2009. He then opened the tattoo studios Sang Bleu London, Sang Bleu Zurich, and Sang Bleu Los Angeles.

He has designed T-shirts for Alexander McQueen, and luxury watches for Hublot. He has tattooed the celebrity clients Kanye West and Adam Lambert.

== Publications ==
- 1000 (2016)
- 2009 (2020)
