= Max Lamb =

British furniture designer (born 1980)

- Born: 1980 (age 45–46); Cornwall
- Education: Northumbria University, Royal College of Art

Max Lamb MBE (born 1980) is a British furniture designer who combines traditional, often primitive, design methods with experimental processes. He is known for employing unusual approaches to using natural materials, including pouring pewter onto sand, and volcanic rock.

His studio is based in London.

== Personal life ==
Lamb was born in Cornwall in 1980.

He attended Northumbria University, receiving a degree in three dimensional design in 2003. In 2006, he received his master's degree in Design Products from the Royal College of Art. After graduation, his professor, industrial designer Tom Dixon, hired him as a special projects designer.

Lamb started his own design firm in 2007. He has taught at Industrial Design at École cantonale d'art de Lausanne in Switzerland and at the Royal College of Art.

Lamb is married to jewellery designer Gemma Holt.

== Works ==
Lamb works with a diverse range of materials including but not limited to stone, wood, metal, plastic, as well as "Marmoreal", a terrazzo-like composite recipe that he himself invented. He is known for his innovative approach and use of natural materials within his designs. An example of this experimentation is his triangular pewter stool, which he created by digging the form of the stool into the sand and pouring liquid pewter into the sand form. He has also made a pewter stool that combines triangular shapes. Another example of natural elements used in his art work is his Nanocrystalline copper works.

Lamb often uses traditional techniques to achieve innovative contemporary solutions. His Urushi Series is a collection of seating, tables and cabinets finished with Urushi lacquer from Wajima, Ishikawa, Japan. The structure of each piece is obtained by cleaving chestnut with green-woodworking techniques in order to preserve the natural appearance of the wood. Urushi lacquer is then applied following traditional Japanese methods.

Lamb's respect for natural materials, specifically wood, is evident in the project 'My Grandfather's Tree by Max Lamb'. Shown for the first time at Somerset House (London, UK) in 2015, the project was a compilation of 131 logs installed and arranged in the same order the tree was meticulously cut. Originally the work formed a 187 years old Ash tree from Monckton Walk Farm (Yorkshire). As the tree had been affected by ash dieback, the designer decided to give it a new history; this resulted in a collection of 'general purpose' logs that respect the tree's life by revealing its growth rings, knots, branches and crotches.

The designer's extensive practice was epitomized in an exhibition entitled "Exercises in Seating" (2015) where he arranged in a circle 40 uniquely designed chairs that he made using various materials and techniques spanning the course of nearly ten years; the exhibition was held in Milan, Italy, during the Milan Design Week.

Exercises in Seating has subsequently been shown at Villa Noailles, Hyères, France in 2016, Art Institute Chicago, Chicago USA in 2018 and in Harrow on the Hill, London, UK in 2025.

== Exhibitions ==
2026

- Max Lamb: Elements, SCAD Museum of Art, Savannah, Georgia, USA

2025

- Max Lamb: Exercises in Seating 3, London

2024

- Inventory, Salon 94 Design, New York

2023

- Mirror Mirror: Reflections on Design at Chatsworth, United Kingdom
- Box by Max Lamb at Gallery FUMI

2019

- Max Lamb: Special Delivery – Salon 94 Design, New York, USA
- Urushi Wajima by Max Lamb at Gallery FUMI, London

2018

- Max Lamb: Exercises in Seating – The Art Institute of Chicago, USA
- Re-Considering Canon – Design Museum, London, UK
- Poème Brut – Design Museum Gent, Belgium

2017

- Boulders by Max Lamb – New York, New York, Salo 94 Design
- Solid Textile Board benches by Max Lamb for Really and Kvadrat – Salone del Mobile, Milan, Italy

2016

- Villa Noailles Design Parade – Hyères, France
- Albanian Pavilion, Venice Biennale of Architecture – Venice, Italy
- Book & Branch – My Grandfather's Tree by Max Lamb – Gallery FUMI, London, UK

2015

- My Grandfather's Tree by Max Lamb – Gallery FUMI, Somerset House, London, UK
- Ayan Farah, Max Lamb, & Chris Succo – Almine Rech Gallery, London, UK
- Echo – Exhibition -The Gallery at Plymouth College of Art, Plymouth, UK
- Marmoreal, Design Miami/Basel – Dzek, Basel, Switzerland
- Exercises in Seating – Milan, Italy

2014

- Design is a State of Mind – Serpentine Galleries, London, UK
- Luke Gottelier & Max Lamb – Kate Macgarry, London, UK
- Marmoreal, Milan Design Week – Dzek, Milan, Italy
- 2013
- Modern Makers, Chatsworth House, UK

2012

- Making Ideas: Experiments in Design, GlassLab, Corning Museum of Glass, New York, US
- Mark-ing, British Council, Japan Design Week, Tokyo, Japan
- Rocky Crockery for 1882 Ltd, London Design Festival, London, UK
- RAW CRAFT, Fine Thinking In Contemporary Furniture, touring Exhibition by Crafts Council – Collect 2012, London, UK

2011

- Studioware – Gallery FUMI, London, UK
- Superba – J.F. Chen, Los Angeles, US
- Designs of the Year – Design Museum, London, UK
- Deptford Design Market Challenge, Studio Raw, London Design Festival, London, UK
- Prototypes & Experiments IV – The Aram Gallery, London, UK

2010

- The New Domestic Landscape – Northern Gallery for Contemporary Art, UK
- Commissioned – Milan Design Week, Milan, Italy
- Objects with a Void – Workshop For Potential Design, London, UK
- The Vermiculated Ashlar, HSBC Private Bank Design Collection Commission & London Design Festival – Victoria and Albert Museum, London, UK

2009

- Corn Craft, Gallery FUMI, London, UK
- Passionsweg Max Lamb, R. & L. Lobmeyer – Vienna Design Week, Austria
- Tokyo Designers Week – Tokyo, Japan

2008

- Beau Sauvage – Gallery Libby Sellers, London, England
- Max Lamb Solo Show – Johnson Trading Gallery, New York, US
- Materialism – Gallery FUMI, London, UK
- Solids of Revolution – Design Miami/Basel, Basel, Switzerland

2007

- Top Ten – British Council, Milan, Italy
- Max & Hannah Lamb – Godolphin House, Cornwall, UK
- Inspired by Cologne – Imm Cologne, Germany
- Decompressions Chamber – Northern Gallery of Contemporary Art, Sunderland, UK

== Awards ==
- 2010 – HSBC Design Collection Commission
- 2009 – 'The Essence of the 21st Century' Courvoisier Award
- 2008 – ‘Designer of the Future’ – Design Miami/Basel
- 2004 – Hettich International Design Award

== Museums acquisitions and collections ==
- Centre National des Arts Plastiques, Paris, FR
- Design Museum Gent, BE
- The Israel Museum, Jerusalem, Israel
- Odunpazarı Modern Museum, Eskişehir, Turkey
- San Francisco Museum of Modern Art (SFMoMA), CA
- Vitra Design Museum, Weil am Rhein, DE
- The Art Institute Chicago, Chicago, Ill, USA
- Frac Ile-De-France, Paris, FR
- Victoria & Albert Museum, London, UK
- Denver Art Museum, Denver, CO, USA

== Books and other publications ==
- Exercises in Seating Volumes 1 – 3 (2025) published by Dent-De-Leone
- Inventory Works (2024) published by Dent-De-Leone
- Box (2023) published by Dent-De-Leone
- Urushi is not Alone (2019) published by Dent-De-Leone
- Max Lamb: Exercises in Seating (2018) published by Yale University Press
- My Grandfather's Tree (2015) published by Dent-De-Leone
- Exercises in Seating (2015) published by Dent-De-Leone
- China Granite Project II (2010) published by Apartamento Books
