= Swiss Design Awards =

Influential design award organised by the Swiss Government

- Description: Federal promotion of Swiss design through an annual competition
- Country: Switzerland
- Presented by: Federal Office of Culture (FOC)
- Website: http://www.swissdesignawards.ch/

The Swiss Design Awards competition is a hundred-year old design award and one of the three means of design promotion by the Swiss government's Federal Office of Culture, along with the Most Beautiful Swiss Books and the Grand Prix Design. They are open to Swiss designers and to designers resident in Switzerland. Around 17 prizes of CHF 25,000 each are awarded each year.

== Competition procedure and selection process ==
The Federal Design Commission (previously known as the Federal Commission for Applied Arts) acts as the jury. The commission is assisted by recognised experts, who it invites for the jury.

The type of work accepted in the competition includes graphic design, products and objects, fashion and textile design, photography, scenography and mediation, media and interaction design, and design research.

The competition takes place in two rounds. In the first round, participants submit an entry. The candidates selected by the Commission are invited to a second round, where they present their work at the Swiss Design Awards public exhibition. The exhibition takes place every year in June, at the same time as the Art Basel and Design Miami/Basel exhibitions, and attracts more than 12'000 visitors every year. The committee selects the winners shortly before the opening of the exhibition.

The competition is influential in Switzerland. It is critically reputed and its relatively high money prize can exert a positive impact on designers' careers.

== History ==
The competition was founded in 1917 as a sister competition to the Swiss Art Awards, which had been running since 1898. In 1917, the Swiss government created the Federal Commission of the Applied Arts (FCAA) to support the applied arts via grants, exhibitions, subsidies for professional associations and general financial backing for the applied arts.

The FCAA was initially under the control of the professional associations Schweizerischer Werkbund SWB and L'Oeuvre. From the 1960s, in the international context of social norm upheaval, the government began a process of reviewing cultural policy. A group of experts was asked to provide advice, which became known as the Clottu Commission.

In the 1990s, the Swiss Design Awards in particular, and the Federal Office of Culture's approach to cultural policy in general were heavily criticised by the Schweizerischer Werkbund. This contributed to a redefinition and relaunch of the competition in 2002.

In 1997, the government celebrated 100 years of Swiss Federal Design promotion with the publication Made in Switzerland.

== Winners (2016–2025) ==
The following table lists the winners of the Swiss Design Awards from 2016 to 2025, as published by the Swiss Federal Office of Culture. In 2020, due to the COVID-19 pandemic, the physical exhibition and final judging round were canceled, and no official award winners were named.

Year	Category	Winner(s)
2025	Design Research	Herding wool - Alix Arto, Emma Casella & Yihan Zhang
2025	Fashion & Textile Design	Didier Angelo
2025	Fashion & Textile Design	Josiane Martinho
2025	Fashion & Textile Design	Plisseebrennerei Textilatelier Eva Ott
2025	Graphic Design	Adrien Kaeser & Adeline Mollard
2025	Graphic Design	Marc Hollenstein
2025	Graphic Design	Minjong Kim & Juanjun Feng
2025	Graphic Design	Studio Nüssli+Nuessli
2025	Media & Interaction design	Akuto Studio
2025	Photography	Laurence Rasti
2025	Photography	Miranda Devita Kistler
2025	Photography	Santiago Martinez Benedetti
2025	Product Design	dversa.studio
2025	Product Design	Laure Gremion
2025	Product Design	Renaud Defrancesco
2025	Mediation & Scenography	Anna Zimmermann
2025	Mediation & Scenography	Collectif Tu es canon - ASA-HM
2024	Design Research	ECOMADE
2024	Design Research	Robin Luginbuhl
2024	Fashion & Textile Design	Annina Arter
2024	Fashion & Textile Design	Augmented Weaving
2024	Fashion & Textile Design	MINI ETIQUETTE
2024	Graphic Design	Simone Farner & Naima Schalcher
2024	Graphic Design	Sylvan Lanz
2024	Graphic Design	Ornari Project
2024	Media & Interaction design	Ted Davis
2024	Media & Interaction design	Studio Harris Blondman (Harry Bloch & Joris Landman)
2024	Photography	Lena Amuat & Zoë Meyer
2024	Photography	Johanna Hullár
2024	Photography	taje
2024	Product Design	Beat Baumgartner
2024	Product Design	Studio Eidola
2024	Product Design	Meret Walther
2024	Mediation & Scenography	NCCFN Group
2023	Design Research	Dimitri Reist
2023	Design Research	Salvatore Vitale
2023	Fashion & Textile Design	Sherylin Birth
2023	Fashion & Textile Design	Anastasia Bull
2023	Fashion & Textile Design	Rafael Edem Kouto
2023	Fashion & Textile Design	Yvonne Reichmuth, YVY
2023	Fashion & Textile Design	Martin Schlegel, TDS Textildruckerei Arbon GmbH
2023	Graphic Design	Chiachi Chao
2023	Graphic Design	Benjamin Ganz
2023	Graphic Design	Pauline Mayor & Loïc Volkart
2023	Graphic Design	zweikommasieben Magazin: Dorothee Dähler, Kaj Lehmann
2023	Mediation	Front Row: Tara Mabiala & Camille Farrah Buhler
2023	Photography	Thaddé Comar
2023	Photography	Tamara Janes
2023	Photography	Laurence Kubski
2023	Product Design	Dimitri Bähler
2023	Product Design	Carlo Clopath & Serge Borgmann
2022	Design Research	Claudia Colombo
2022	Fashion & Textile Design	DANZ
2022	Fashion & Textile Design	PROTOTYPES AG
2022	Graphic Design	Hammer
2022	Graphic Design	Adeline Mollard
2022	Graphic Design	Offshore
2022	Media & Interaction Design	Urs Hofer
2022	Media & Interaction Design	Linn Spitz
2022	Mediation & Scenography	FUTURESS
2022	Mediation & Scenography	Old Masters
2022	Photography	Jeremy Ayer
2022	Photography	Anne Morgenstern
2022	Photography	Jenny Rova
2022	Product Design	Maxwell Ashford
2022	Product Design	Silvio Rebholz
2022	Product Design	Sebastian Marbacher
2022	Product Design	Ursula Vogel
2021	Fashion & Textile Design	Virginie Jemmely
2021	Fashion & Textile Design	Mariel Manuel
2021	Fashion & Textile Design	Ottolinger (Christa Erika Bösch & Cosima Gadient)
2021	Graphic Design	Eurostandard (Ali-Eddine Abdelkhalek, Pierrick Brégeon, Clément Rouzaud)
2021	Graphic Design	Hannes Gloor
2021	Graphic Design	Jonathan Hares
2021	Graphic Design	Weichi He
2021	Graphic Design	Olga Prader
2021	Graphic Design	Luca Schenardi
2021	Mediation	Dafi Kühne
2021	Mediation	Edition Moderne (Julia Marti & Claudio Barandun)
2021	Photography	Marc Asekhame
2021	Photography	Sabina Bösch
2021	Photography	Quentin Lacombe
2021	Products & Objects	AATB (Andrea Anner, Thibault Brevet)
2021	Products & Objects	Noa Wynona Betsche
2021	Products & Objects	Alexandra Gerber Studio
2020	-	-
2019	Fashion & Textile Design	Rafael Kouto
2019	Fashion & Textile Design	Sandro Marzo
2019	Fashion & Textile Design	Ottolinger (Christa Bösch, Cosima Gadient)
2019	Graphic Design	Fabian Bremer, Pascal Storz
2019	Graphic Design	Ard (Guillaume Chuard, Daniel Nørregaard)
2019	Graphic Design	Ondřej Báchor
2019	Graphic Design	Ann Kern
2019	Graphic Design	Sylvan Lanz
2019	Photography	Marc Asekhame
2019	Photography	Solène Gün
2019	Photography	Lukas Hoffmann
2019	Products & Objects	Egli Studio (Thibault Dussex, Yann Mathis)
2019	Products & Objects	FILIPE & VIRICEL (Micael Filipe, Romain Viricel)
2019	Products & Objects	Dimitri Nassisi
2019	Products & Objects	Julie Richoz
2019	Scenography	BUREAU (Daniel Zamarbide Elizondo)
2019	Mediation	common-interest (Corinne Gisel, Nina Paim)
2018	Fashion & Textile Design	Rafael Kouto
2018	Fashion & Textile Design	Xénia Lucie Laffely
2018	Fashion & Textile Design	Mikael Vilchez
2018	Graphic Design	Studio Harris Blondman (Harry Bloch & Joris Landman)
2018	Graphic Design	Julia Born
2018	Graphic Design	Céline Ducrot
2018	Graphic Design	Marietta Eugster
2018	Graphic Design	Dan Solbach
2018	Photography	Zoé Aubry
2018	Photography	Senta Simond
2018	Photography	Jean-Vincent Simonet
2018	Products & Objects	Christophe Guberan
2018	Products & Objects	Simon Husslein
2018	Products & Objects	Adrien Rovero
2018	Products & Objects	Laurin Schaub
2018	Mediation	Hammer (Sereina Rothenberger, David Schatz)
2018	Mediation	YET magazine (Nicolas Polli, Salvatore Vitale)
2017	Fashion & Textile Design	Vanessa Schindler
2017	Fashion & Textile Design	Julia Seemann
2017	Fashion & Textile Design	Mikael Vilchez
2017	Graphic Design	Dinamo (Johannes Breyer, Fabian Harb)
2017	Graphic Design	Robert Huber
2017	Graphic Design	Johnson / Kingston (Michael Kryenbühl, Ivan Weiss)
2017	Graphic Design	Omnigroup (Luke Archer, Leonardo Azzolini, Simon Mager, Frederik Mahler-Andersen)
2017	Graphic Design	Studio Feixen (Raphel Leutenegger, Daniel Peter, Felix Pfäffli)
2017	Photography	Erwan Frotin
2017	Photography	Jean-Vincent Simonet
2017	Products & Objects	Michel Charlot
2017	Products & Objects	Damian Fopp
2017	Products & Objects	Max Frommeld & Arno Mathies
2017	Products & Objects	Kueng Caputo (Lovis Caputo, Sarah Kueng)
2017	Products & Objects	Bertille Laguet
2017	Products & Objects	Sebastian Marbacher
2017	Mediation	Depot Basel (Rebekka Kiesewetter, Matylda Krzykowski, Heidi Franke)
2016	Fashion & Textile Design	Lucie Guiragossian
2016	Fashion & Textile Design	Vera Roggli
2016	Fashion & Textile Design	Julian Zigerli
2016	Graphic Design	Alice Franchetti
2016	Graphic Design	Pause ohne Ende (Matthias Hachen, Mischa Hedinger)
2016	Graphic Design	Teo Schifferli
2016	Photography	Simone Cavadini
2016	Photography	Etienne Malapert
2016	Photography	Laurence Rasti
2016	Photography	Manon Wertenbroek
2016	Products & Objects	Christophe Guberan
2016	Products & Objects	VELT (Stefan Rechsteiner, Patrick Rüegg)
2016	Scenography	Kollektiv Krönlihalle (Seraina Borner, Barbara Brandmaier, Markus Läubli, Christoph Menzi, Andrea Münch, Thomas Stächelin)
