= Youri Messen-Jaschin =

Swiss artist

Youri Messen-Jaschin in 2016. Swiss Op art artist born in Arosa (1941), active since the 1959s.

Youri Messen-Jaschin is an artist of Latvian origin, born in Arosa, Switzerland, in 1941. He often combines oils and gouaches. He also works in body painting, exhibiting his works in nightclubs.

== Biography ==
Between 1958 and 1962 Youri Messen-Jaschin studied Fine art at the École nationale supérieure des Beaux-Arts (student of Robert Cami) and History of art at the École pratique des hautes études (student of Pierre Francastel), both in Paris.

Between 1962 and 1965, he attended the École cantonale d'art de Lausanne.

He worked with engraver and painter Ernest Pizzotti. He exposed his kinetic glass and acrylic sculptures in Lausanne in 1964. He worked two years at the Center of Contemporary Engraving in Geneva and then in Zürich, where he collaborated with the painter Friederich Kuhn.

Between 1968 and 1970, he studied at the School of Design and Crafts in Göteborg, where he researched textile kinetic objects. There, through his discussions with artists Jesús Rafael Soto, Carlos Cruz-Diez and Julio Le Parc, he became increasingly interested in by Op art and decided to devote all his research to Kinetic art. He started to increasingly integrate movement and geometric shapes in his textiles and oil paintings.

In 1968, he received the first prize for Swiss contemporary engraving art as well as a scholarship from the Swedish government. In 1970, he worked in Hamburg, collaborating with North German artists on monumental projects, and created a kinetic sculpture for Gould in Eichstetten, Germany.

Youri Messen-Jaschin traveled in South America, where he was able to discuss architecture – which plays an important role in his work – and its relations to his own research on movement with architects and artists like Oscar Niemeyer and Roberto Burle Marx in Rio de Janeiro, Ruy Ohtake in São Paulo, and Clorindo Testa in Buenos Aires. In 1984 in Caracas, he staged theatre and choreography of his own works at the Ateneo, the Eugenio Mendoza Foundation, the Asociación Cultural Humboldt (Goethe-Institut), and at the Alliance française.

After a stay of several months in New York, he returned to Switzerland in 1971, where he took up residence in Bern, where he lived for eleven years. During his stay, he frequently exhibited at the Kunsthalle and other local museums. He currently lives in Lausanne, Switzerland.

In 1981, during a stay in Buenos Aires, Youri Messen-Jaschin met the artist Gyula Kosice, co-founder of the Arte Madí movement. Kosice, impressed by the perceptual and geometric dimension of Messen-Jaschin's work, symbolically included him in the Madí circle — a recognition later recorded in a publication by Kosice himself.Gyula Kosice, Arte Madí, Buenos Aires: Ediciones de Arte Gaglianone, 1982, p. 178. ISBN 978-950-00-0418-3.

He participated in many international exhibitions. His works are in private collections, in national and international museums.

== Gallery ==

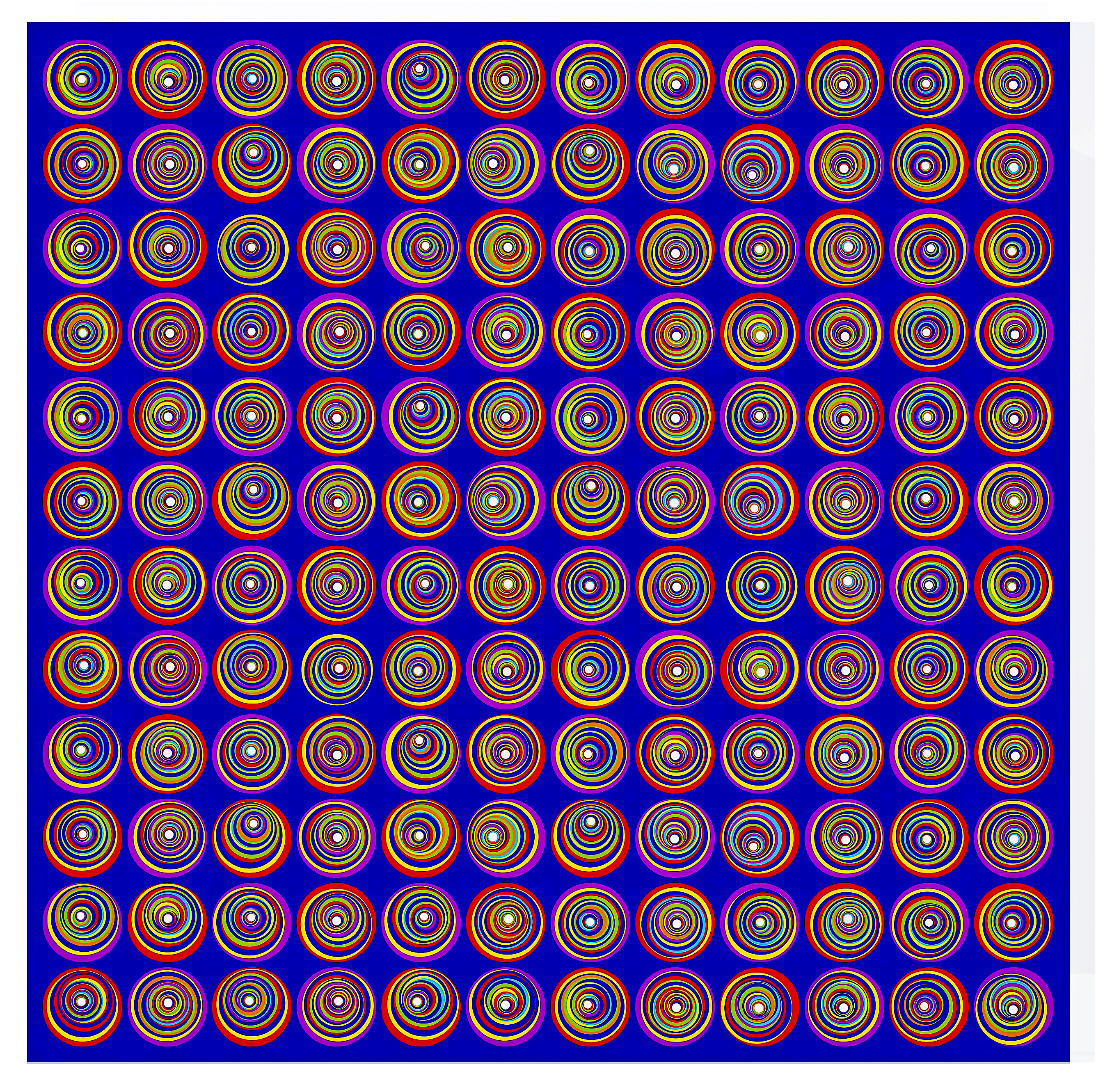
Variation on ZN spin model is a large-format Op Art screen print (180×180 cm) created by Youri Messen-Jaschin in 2021 and printed on aluminum. It is based on a visual interpretation of spin symmetries and optical vibrational structures.

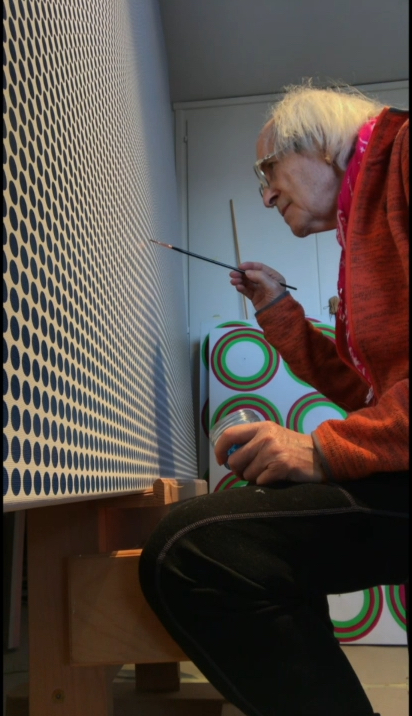
Youri Messen-Jaschin painting Blue Two in his Lausanne studio (2020). The artwork belongs to a private collection.

=== Gallery of Op art works ===
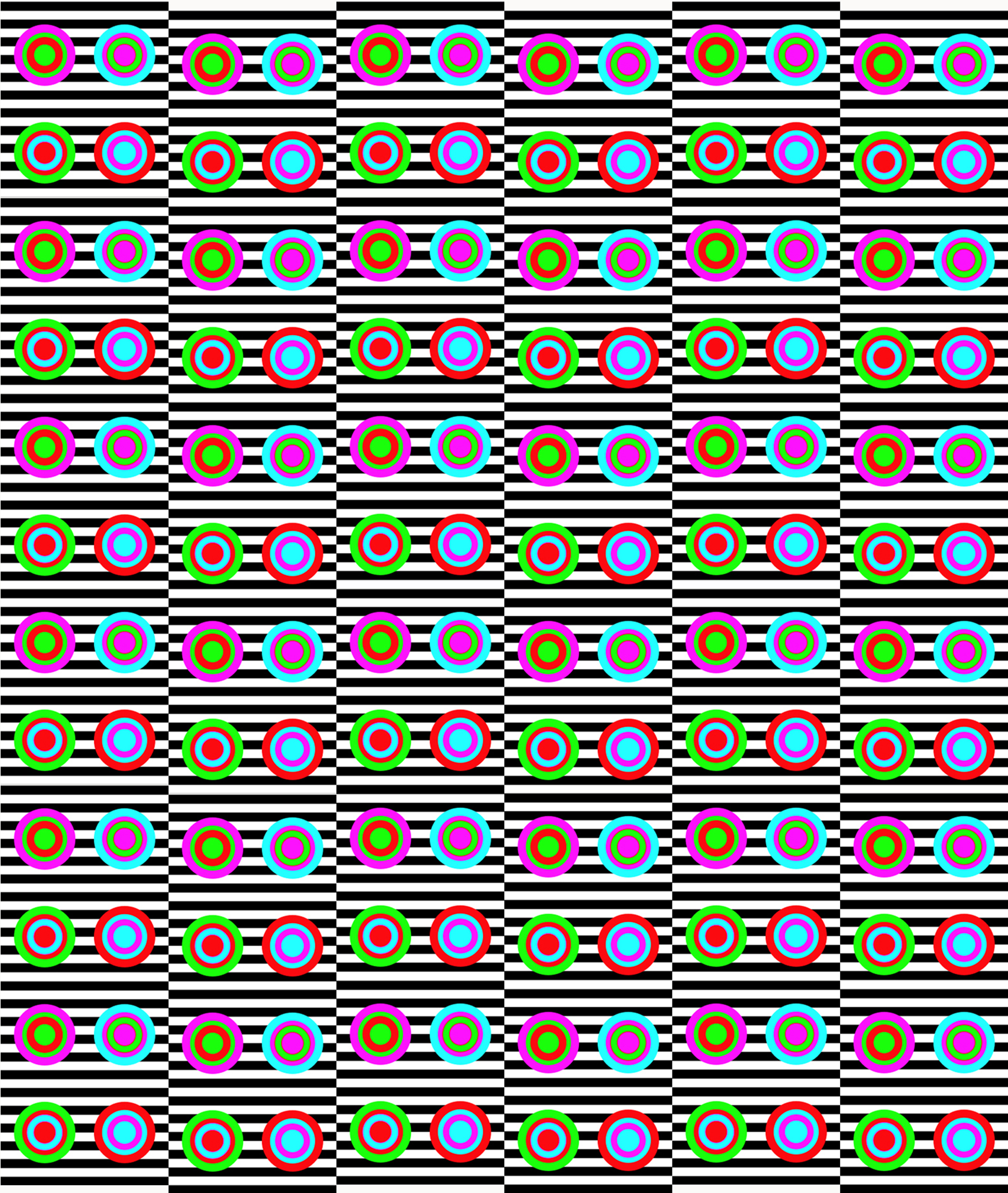
Quantique (2022), silkscreen on linen canvas (200 × 170 cm). Unique edition. Winner of the 2022 Talent Prize Award in Los Angeles. Optical illusion changes with angle, inspired by quantum dynamics.

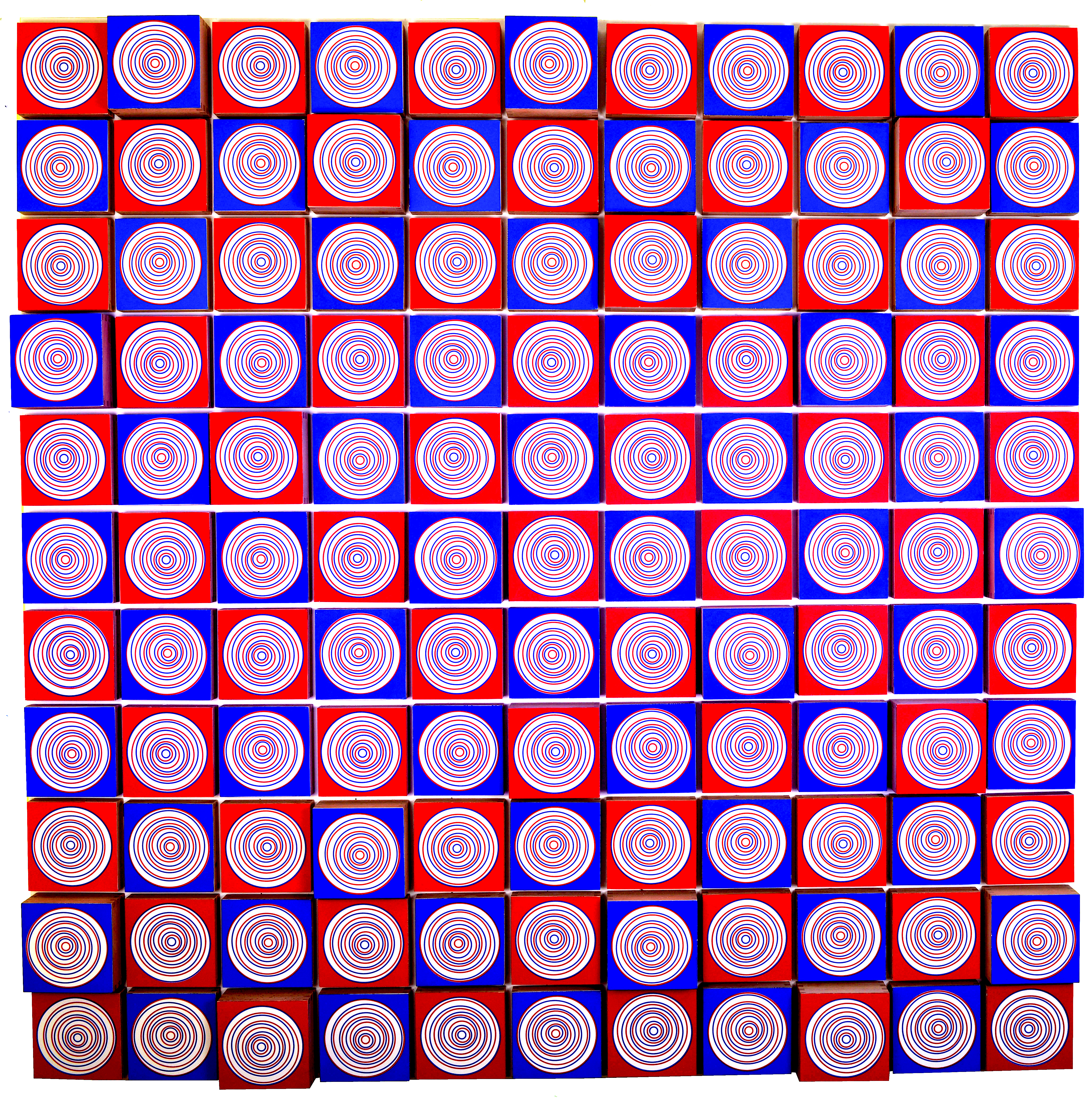
Spiral (2012), oil painting on wood (177 × 177 × 16.3 cm). Exhibited in Moscow (2016), featured on Channel One Television. Collection: POPA Museum, Porrentruy, Switzerland.

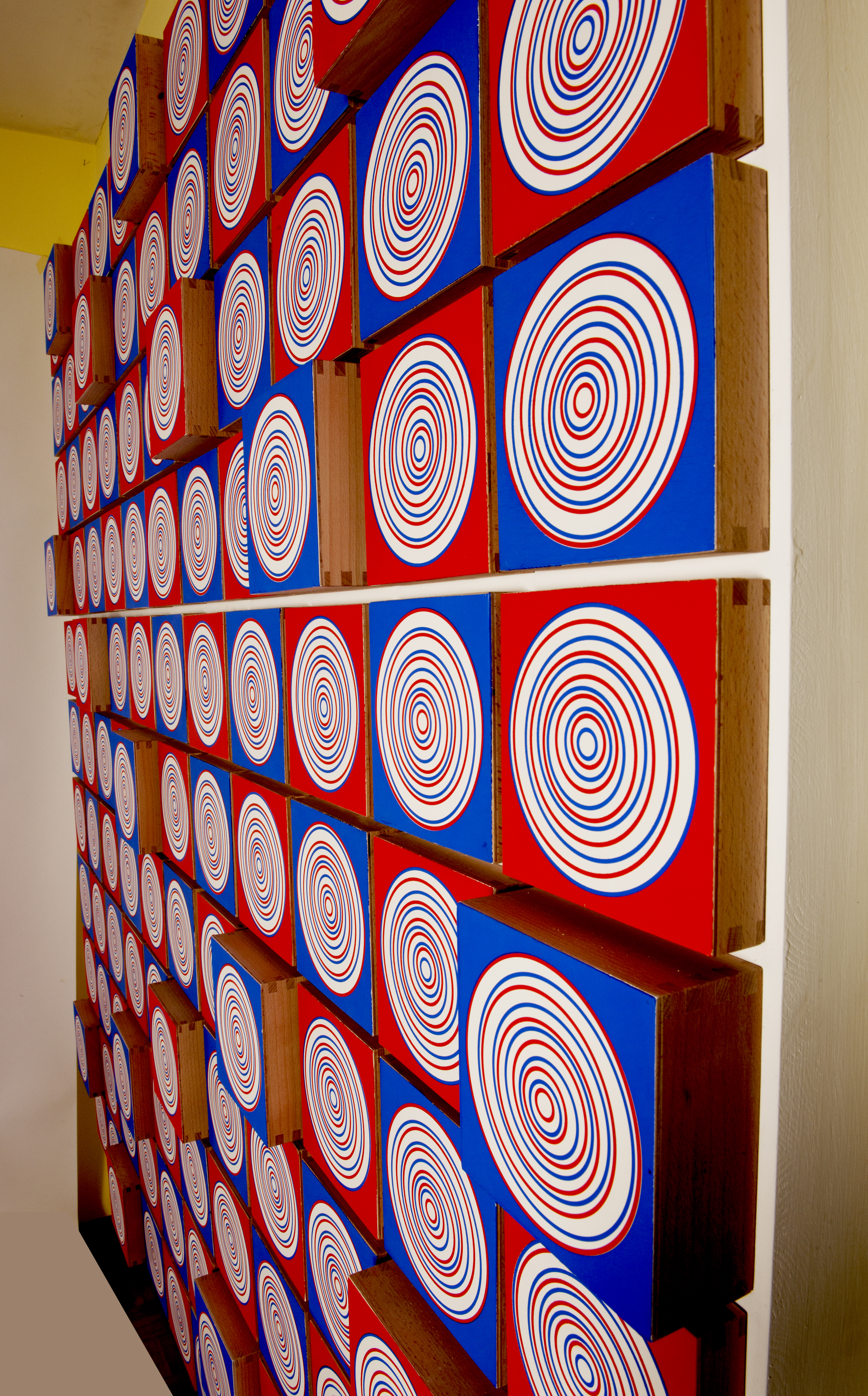
Detail from Spiral (2012), oil painting on wood. This close-up reveals the complex optical structure and vibrant contrasts typical of Youri Messen-Jaschin's Op art.

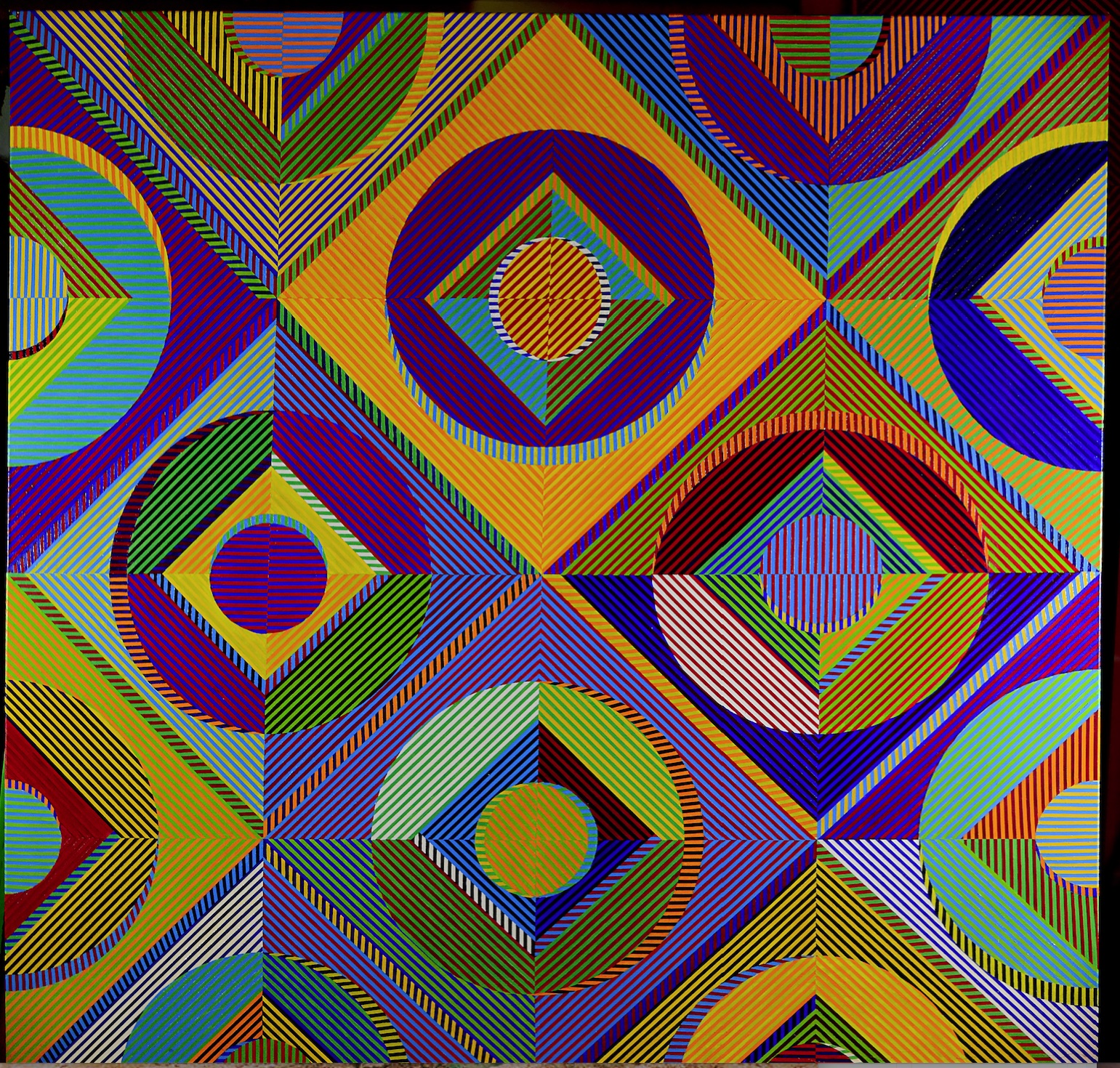
Dance Line (2001), Op art, oil painting on linen canvas (180 × 180 cm). Collection of the POPA Museum (Op art and Illusion Museum), Porrentruy, Switzerland.

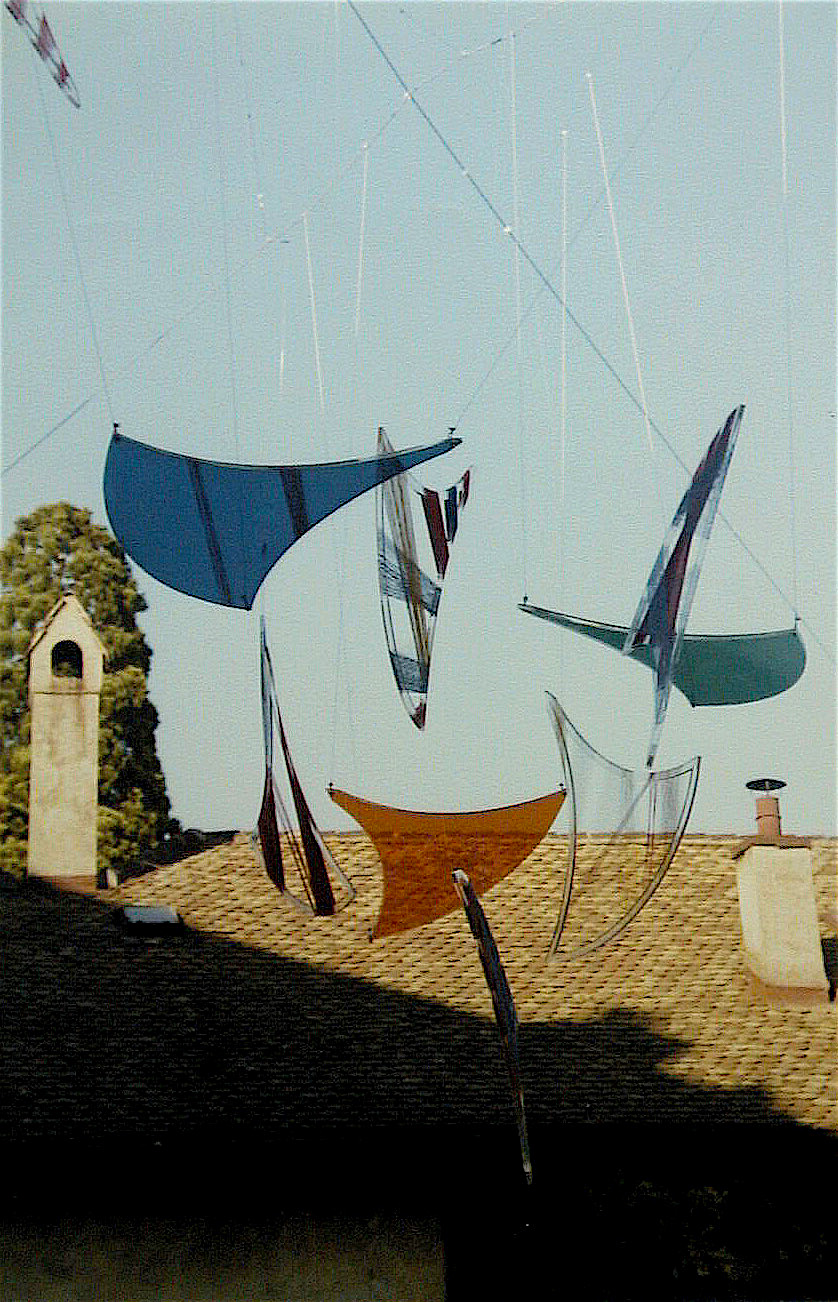
Pléiades (1977), outdoor mobile sculpture made of plexiglass and perlon thread. Exhibited in various international shows and referenced in several publications.

Perpetuum mobile III, a three-dimensional Op art installation. Static but appears to move through viewer interaction with light and angle.

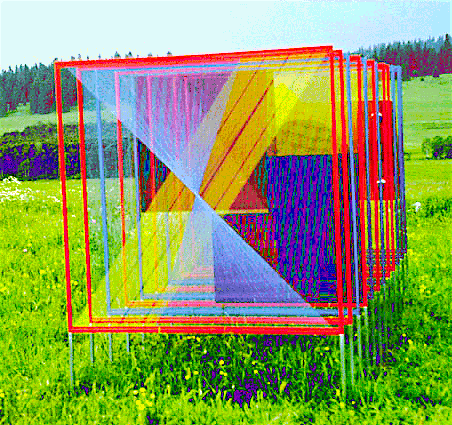
Vibration I (1980), Op art sculpture in steel, plexiglass, and perlon thread (400 × 500 × 700 cm). The threads capture sound through electrodes and convert their vibrations (e.g. ants, water drops) into concrete music via computer. Private collection, USA.

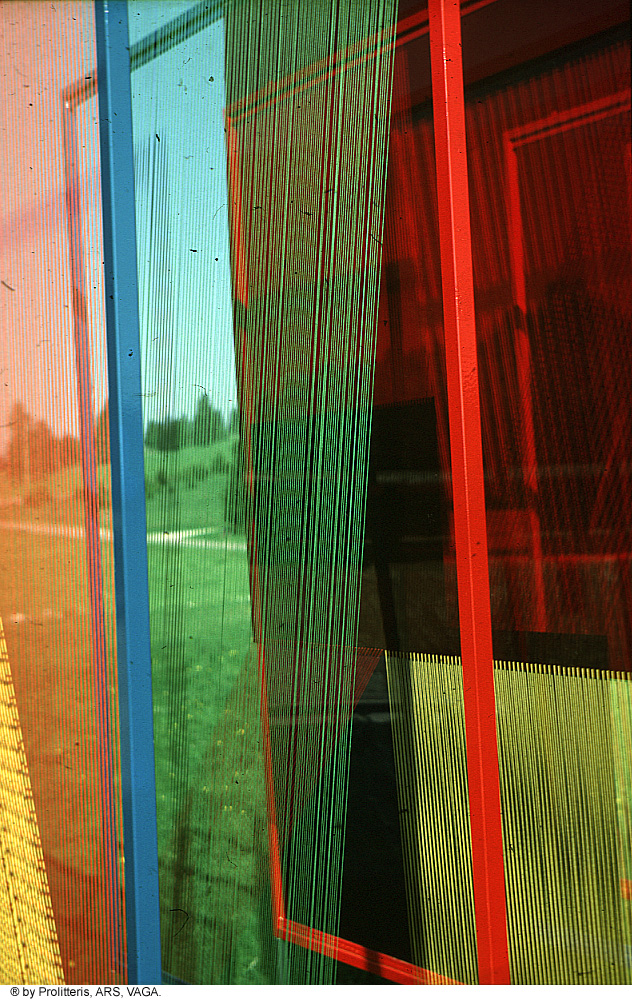
Detail of the Op art sculpture Vibration in steel, plexiglass and perlon thread. Electrodes translate sounds into concrete music. Private collection, USA.

== Exhibitions ==
- 1966 Galerie du Vieux-Bourg, Lausanne / Switzerlaand
- 1966 Galerie del Nocciolo Lugano / Switzerland
- 1967 Galerie St.Gill Paris;
- 1967 Atelier-Theater Berne;
- 1967 Internationaal Kunstmesse Emmelord, The Netherlands
- 1994 1. International Art competition New York
- 1995 2. International Art competition New York
- 1998 2nd. Angel Orensanz Foundation New York; Center for the Arts «Installation Art Award» New York; 1998 2nd. Angel Orensanz Foundation New York
- 2000 International Competition Celebrating Artistic Achievement/AIM Funds Management & The Federation of Canadian Artists Vancouver
- 2007 "International Print Exhibition Tokyo 2007" Tokyo Metropolitan Museum Tokyo Japan
- 2013 Youri Messen-Jaschin: Op Art, Galerie du Château, Renens, Switzerland
- 2016 Chanel 1, Television. Moscow
- 2018 POPA Museum | Exhibition Youri Messen-Jaschin Op Art | April 20 – May 21 | Porrentruy, Switzerland
- 2019 Youri Messen-Jaschin | Galerie du Château, Renens, Switzerland | March 15 – April 7, 2019
- 2019 Chelsea | International art competition | digital show | New York
- 2019 Art Room Gallery | on line Award « Artifact « USA
- 2022 Art Basel Miami beach | Miami | USA (collective exhibition)
- 2023 Art Lab | Venice Beach | Los Angeles | USA (collective exhibition)
- 2023 Jonathan Schulz Gallery | Miami | USA (collective exhibition)
- 2023 New York Art weeks, New York (collective exhibition)
- 2023–2024 Andakulova Gallery, Dubai, Emirats Arabes Unis (collective exhibition)
- 2024 Artspace innovations « Times Square « New York
- 2025 Foundation Ferme du Grand-Cachot-de-Vent https://www.grand-cachot.ch/youri-messen-jaschin
- 2025 Andata.Ritorno Geneva

== Books and magazines ==
- 2000 Premio Internazionale di scultura "Terzo millenio" Terra Moretti Editor Fiorenza Mursia/Milan/Italy
- 2016 Guide Contemporain, volume III, p. 138 | Published by the Fondation Lémanique pour l'Art Contemporain
- 2021 L'Op art rencontre les neurosciences | Published by Editor Favre Lausanne This richly illustrated book explores the effects of optical art on the brain through a collaboration between scientists and the artist. ISBN 978-2-8289-1888-0
- 2022 Youri Messen-Jaschin, an artist who plays with your brain, Swiss Review, The magazine for the Swiss Abroad, p. 10–11.

== Awards ==
- USA Award Artavita | 30th international Art Contest | Certificate of excellence | 2019
- USA | Artist of the year award | Award for Wormhole (screen printing) | Foundation for the Art | 2019
- USA | Art Room Contemporary Online Gallery | Merit Award for Excellent Artwork | Feb. 2019
- USA | Art Show International Gallery | Los Angeles | 2021
- USA | Color Honorable Mention Award | Art Show International Gallery | Los Angeles | 2022
- USA | Contemporary Art Collectors USA – Career achievement award | 2024
- USA | Art on Paper – 2024 | by Collexart | Purchase Award Winner | Artist Profile Winners | Boston | 2024
- USA | Homiens New York I Juror have selected your artwork « Artifact « (screen printing) | 2025
- USA | Collexart | Boston | Purchase screen printing Award Winner [ Boston https://www.collexart.com/collexart-2025-grand-prize-art-call] 2025

== Encyclopedic ==
- 1987 to 1992 Who's and Who international art
- 1981 Institut Suisse pour l'étude de l'art, Dictionnaire des artistes suisses contemporains (Swiss institute for the study of art, Dictionary of the contemporary Swiss artists)
- 1970–1980, 1980–1990, 1990–2000 Editor Huber Frauenfeld-Stuttgart/Switzerland/Germany
- 1999 Dictionnaire biographique de l'art Suisse, Répertoire des artistes suisses/ Institut suisse pour l'étude de l'art Zurich & Lausanne (Biographical dictionary of Swiss art, Repertory of the Swiss artists/Swiss Institute for the study of art Zurich & Lausanne) Editor Neue Zürcher Zeitung/Zurich/Switzerland
- 1990–2008 QUID Editor Robert Laffont Paris/France
- 2008 Visarte Vaud – 152 creative personalities | Editor League of visual artists and architects Lausanne Switzerland.

== Theater ==
- 1982 «Psicotronicó» Caracas; ();
- 1983 «Ah! Ah! Barroco» Caracas
- 1983 «La Torta Que Camina» Caracas; (); ();
- 1964 «Embryo» Caracas; ();

== Scientific reception ==
The work of Youri Messen-Jaschin has attracted scientific interest, particularly in relation to its neuroaesthetic effects. A publication from the Max Planck Institute for Mathematics in the Sciences explores the question of whether and how optical art may help relieve or even cure certain mental illnesses:

- "Can optical art relieve or cure certain mental illnesses?", Max Planck Institute for Mathematics in the Sciences (MPI MIS), Leipzig, 2023.
