= Francine Simonin =

Swiss-Canadian artist (1936–2020)

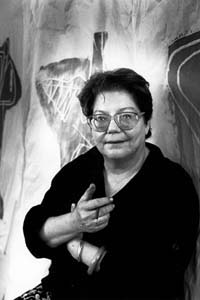
- Simonin in 1990
- Born: 2 October 1936; Lausanne, Switzerland
- Died: 9 October 2020 (aged 84); Montreal, Quebec, Canada
- Occupation: Artist

Francine Simonin (2 October 1936 – 9 October 2020) was a Swiss-Canadian painter, engraver, and designer. She was considered to be an expressionist.

== Biography ==
Simonin received much exposure to painting, literature, and music during her childhood, where she often moved between Lausanne and Champex. She entered the École cantonale d'art de Lausanne in 1953. She attended the studio of Casimir Reymond from 1958 to 1960. During her artistic career, she regularly travelled across Europe and built a friendship with Marguerite Duras, and the two women were very close until the 1980s. She was also good friends with Janette Laverrière.

Between 1958 and 1966, Simonin primarily practiced engraving, mostly practicing on wood and copper. In Pully, she attended the studio of Pierre Cailler, founder of the Guilde de la gravure. She received a federal painting grant in 1964. The following year, she opened her first exhibition at the Galerie Maurice Bridel in Lausanne. In 1970, she began exhibiting her works at the Galerie Numaga de Gilbert Huguenin in Auvernier and at Chez Nane Cailler in Pully.

Simonin moved to Montreal in 1971 following a grant from the Canada Council. In Montreal, she met Jean-Paul Riopelle, René Derouin, Serge Lemoyne, and Pierre Ayot. From 1971 to 1994, she taught at the Université du Québec in Trois-Rivières. She won several public commissions and her works were displayed at the Palais de Justice in Longueuil, the Pavillon Desjardins et Pollack at Université Laval in Sainte-Foy–Sillery–Cap–Rouge, and the Auditorium Stravinsky in Montreux. In 1989, she produced scenic panels for the Festival International de Musique Actuelle de Victoriaville and for the scene of Philippe Saire's 1995 play Palindrome, staged in Lausanne.

Simonin's works were regularly displayed by Galerie Lacerte in Montreal. She also did much of her work in Évian-les-Bains. Her works are present in many private and public collections, including the Bibliothèque et Archives nationales du Québec, the Musée Jenisch, the Musée national des beaux-arts du Québec, the Cantonal and University Library of Lausanne, the Fondation Pierre Gianadda, and the Bibliothèque nationale de France.

Francine Simonin died in Montreal on 9 October 2020 at the age of 84.

== Awards ==
- Prize of the Fondation Irène Reymond (1986)
- Grand Prix Beaux-Arts of the Fondation vaudoise pour la culture (1990)
- Prize of the Fondation Monique et Robert Parizeau for her contribution to the history of printmaking in Quebec
