= Midnight Trains =

French start-up railway company

Overview
- Parent company: Privately held
- Headquarters: Paris, France
- Founders: Adrien Aumont; Romain Payet
- Dates of operation: 2020s–

Other
- Website: midnight-trains.com

Midnight Trains was a French start-up railway company. It aimed to expand sleeper train services in Europe.

As of January 2023, the company aimed for its first route to commence operations in December 2024, with a fully operational network by 2030. Routes were planned from Paris to Spain, Italy, Portugal, Germany and Denmark. As of 2024, service on its first line was expected by 2025.

It was founded by Adrien Aumont and Romain Payet, the founders of French crowdfunding website KissKissBankBank. Yorgo Tloupas, associate artistic director, and Hervé Marro, director of communication and institutional relations, also joined the company.

In January 2023, Midnight Trains revealed in its weekly newsletter that the company had secured rolling stock in December 2022. The stock was brand new and acquired via a leasing model with a rolling stock leasing company (ROSCO).

Later that month, the European Commission announced it would be supporting ten proposals, including a proposal from Midnight Trains for night-train service between Paris, Milan and Venice, as pilot projects involving cross-border rail service as part of efforts to improve international rail travel in Europe and encourage new cross-border rail connections to be created. Midnight Trains was one of three companies with night-train service proposals on the EC's list, the others being European Sleeper and Snälltåget.

Proposals for services between Edinburgh and Paris were dropped in late 2023, owing to complexities involved with running through the Channel Tunnel, including fire resistance of rolling stock and loading gauge concerns on the wider British network.

Midnight Trains focused on the high-end market with rather spacious cabins and originally wanted to employ two restaurant cars per train. Using half of the train carriages for an economy class was also contemplated at some time.

Efforts toward the Midnight Trains project were discontinued in May 2024.
