= List of institutions offering type design education =

The following is a list of institutions offering type design education.

Type design (also: typeface design, pop. font design), the art of creating typefaces, is taught at art and design colleges around the world. A small number of institutions offer a degree in type design; many others offer type design courses as part of their BA or MA curriculum in Graphic Design or Visual Communication. When no full type design course is offered, schools may invite professional type designers to give workshops; these one-off events are not listed in the overview below. (Note: This list is meant to reflect the current situation and relies on direct input from the institutions involved. Little written documentation is available, and the institutions' websites are not always up to date.)

== Specialized type design degrees ==
=== Argentina ===
Universidad de Buenos Aires
FADU/UBA, Secretaría de Posgrado
MT-UBA, Maestría en Tipografía (Note: In Romance languages, "typographie"/"tipografía", etc., is often used to mean "typography" (the art of using type) as well as "type design" (the art of making type). There is some confusion about this in other languages as well. This article only lists schools that offer a curriculum or course(s) in designing typefaces (fonts).)
Degree:

=== Brazil ===
Universidade Presbiteriana Mackenzie e Tipocracia
Tipografia e Design de Tipos
Degree: Lato sensu postgraduate

Centro Universitário Senac, São Paulo
Pós-graduação Senac-SP
Curso de Pós-graduação em Tipografia
Degree: Lato sensu postgraduate

=== France ===
École Estienne, Paris
Atelier de Création Typographique
DSAA Design Typographique
Degree: Master 1

École supérieure d’art et de design, Amiens
EsadType
Post-diplôme Ésad Amiens
Degree: Post-master course

Atelier National de Recherche Typographique, Nancy
ANRT
Degree: Post-master course

=== Germany ===
Hochschule für Grafik und Buchkunst Leipzig
Class Type-Design
Degree: Diplom Type-Design (MFA equivalent)

Bauhaus-Universität Weimar
Professorship for Typography and Type Design
Degree: Visual Communication (B.A.), Visual Communication (M.A.)

Technische Hochschule Augsburg
Professorship for Type
Degree: Communication Design (B.A.), Identity Design (M.A.)

Hochschule für Gestaltung Offenbach am Main
Professorship for Typografie/Type Design
Degree: Fine Arts (B.A.), Fine Arts (M.A.)

Hochschule für Angewandte Wissenschaften Hamburg
Professorship for Type Design
Degree: Communication Design (B.A.), Communication Design (M.A.)

=== Mexico ===
Centro de Estudios Gestalt, Veracruz
Maestría en Diseño Tipográfico

=== The Netherlands ===
Koninklijke Academie van Beeldende Kunsten (KABK), The Hague
(Royal Academy of Art (The Hague))
Master of Design Type and Media
Head of Program: Erik van Blokland
Degree: MA

=== Spain ===
Tipo.g

Laura Meseguer, Co-director
Degree: Diploma in Typographic Creation

University School of Design and Art of Barcelona (EINA)
https://www.eina.cat/es/masters-y-postgrados/creacion-tipografica
Degree: Diploma in Typographic Creation

=== Switzerland ===
École cantonale d'art de Lausanne (ECAL)
(University of Applied Sciences Western Switzerland)
MA Art Direction: Type Design
Degree: MA Art Direction

Zürcher Hochschule der Künste, (University of the Arts) ZHdK, Zürich
CAS Schriftgestaltung (Certificate of Advanced Studies in Type Design)
MAS Type Design and Typography (Master of Advanced Studies in Type Design and Typography)
Degree: Certificate

=== United Kingdom ===
University of Reading
Department of Typography & Graphic Communication
MA in Typeface Design
Degree: MA Typeface Design
Degree: PhD Typography

Anglia Ruskin University

Degree: PHD Graphic Design & Typography

=== United States ===
The Cooper Union for the Advancement of Science and Art, New York City
Postgraduate Certificate in Typeface Design (Type@Cooper)
Degree: Certificate

Letterform Archive, San Francisco
Postgraduate Certificate in Typeface Design (Type West)
Degree: Certificate

School of Visual Arts, New York City
SVA Type Lab A 4-week immersive program in Typeface Design
Degree: CE Summer Residency

== Type design courses at design colleges and universities ==
=== Australia ===
University of Technology Sydney
School of Design, Faculty of Design, Architecture & Building
Bachelor of Design in Visual Communication

=== Belgium ===
Plantin Instituut voor Typografie, Antwerp
Expert Class Type Design
Degree: Certificate

PXL-MAD, Hasselt
Reading Type & Typography
Degree: Bachelor and Master

ENSAV La Cambre, Brussels
Atelier de Typographie & Design Graphique
Degree: Bachelor and Master

=== Brazil ===
Universidade Federal do Ceará (UFC)
Bacharelado em Design (Undergraduate)

Centro Universitário Senac
Bacharelado em Design / Habilitação em Comunicação Visual (Undergraduate)

Universidade de São Paulo, Faculdade de Arquitetura e Urbanismo
Curso de Design (Undergraduate)

Universidade Federal do Espírito Santo (UFES)
Bacharelado em Desenho Industrial / Habilitação em Programação Visual (Undergraduate)

Universidade Federal de Santa Maria (UFSm)
Bacharelado em Desenho Industrial / Habilitação em Programação Visual (Undergraduate)

Universidade Estadual Paulista 'Julio de Mesquita Filho' (UNesp, Bauru)
Bacharelado em Design com habilitação em Design Gráfico (Undergraduate)

Escola Superior de Propaganda e Marketing (ESPM)
Bacharelado em Design com habilitação em Comunicação Visual e ênfase em Marketing (Undergraduate)

=== Canada ===
Emily Carr University of Art + Design, Vancouver
Studio courses in typography
Studio course in Type Design

George Brown College SCHOOLOFDESIGN, Toronto
Studio course: Experimental Typography (Instructor: Carl Shura)

University of Guelph-Humber, Toronto
Course in Type Design
Instructor: Patrick Griffin

OCAD University, Toronto
Course in The Art of Type

York University, Toronto
Course in Typeface Design

Université du Québec à Montréal, Montreal
École de design
Course in Type design
Instructors: Alessandro Colizzi, Étienne Aubert-Bonn

=== Colombia ===
Universidad Nacional de Colombia, Bogotá
Studio course in Type Design

=== Czech Republic ===
UMPRUM (AKA VŠUP or AAAD), Prague
(Academy of Arts, Architecture and Design)
Studio of Type Design and Typography

VUT: FaVU, Brno
(Faculty of Fine Arts at the Brno University of Technology)

=== Denmark ===
Danish School of Media, Copenhagen

The Danish Design School, Copenhagen

=== Finland ===
Aalto University School of Art and Design
Department of Media

=== France ===
École supérieure d’art et de design (ESAD), Amiens
Post-diplôme « Typographie & language »
diplome.esad-amiens.fr Post-diplôme Ésad Amiens

ESAC, Pau
Atelier de typographie

=== Germany ===
Hochschule für Angewandte Wissenschaften, Hamburg
BA / MA Kommunikationsdesign mit Schwerpunkt Type Design

Designschule München
(Berufsfachschule für Kommunikationsdesign)

Fachhochschule Augsburg
(University of Applied Science)
Fachbereich Gestaltung, Studiengang Kommunikationsdesign

Berliner technische Kunsthochschule BTK
(University of Applied Science)
Fachbereich Design, studiengangsübergreifend

Fachhochschule Potsdam
(University of Applied Science)
Fachbereich Design, Modul Kommunikationsdesign

Hochschule Darmstadt
(University of Applied Science)
Fachbereich Gestaltung, Studiengang Kommunikationsdesign

Hochschule Niederrhein
(University of Applied Science)
Fachbereich Design, Faculty of Design

Hochschule der Bildenden Künste Saar
(Academy of Fine Arts Saar)
Studiengang Kommunikationsdesign (BFA, Diplom, MFA)

Kunsthochschule Weißensee, Berlin
(Academy of Fine and Applied Arts Berlin-Weißensee)
Studiengang Visuelle Kommunikation (BFA, Master)

Muthesius Kunsthochschule, Kiel
(Muthesius University of Fine Arts and Design)
Department of Design, Communication Design, Typography, Typeface Design BA and MA courses
Fachbereich Design, Studiengang Kommunikationsdesign, Typografie, Schriftgestaltung BA and MA courses

=== Ireland ===
National College of Art & Design, Dublin

BA(Hons) Graphic Design

=== Italy ===
cfp Bauer, Milano
Type design fundamentals
Type design and Type in motion

Isia Urbino, Urbino
Typographic techniques
Type design

Politecnico di Milano, Milano
Type Design (Communication Design BA)

=== México ===
Benemérita Universidad Autónoma de Puebla, Puebla
Specialization course in Typeface Design

=== Poland ===
Akademia Sztuk Pięknych, Poznań
Poznaniu Pracownia Znaku i Typografii
Sign and Typography Studio

Akademicki Kurs Typografii, Warsaw
Akademicki Kurs Typografii

=== Portugal ===
Communication and Art Department, University of Aveiro
Course Syllabus
Typography Course blog

Escola Superior de Arte e Design das Caldas da Rainha, Instituto Politécnico de Leiria
Graphic Design Course Type Design studies

Escola Superior de Arte e Design de Matosinhos
Communication Design Course Type Design studies

Fine Art Faculty of the University of Porto
Course Syllabus
Type Design course website (course description, blog, projects, results,…)

=== Russia ===
British Higher School of Art and Design, Moscow
Course of Type & Typography

Moscow State University of Printing Arts
Type Design Workshop

=== Spain ===
Tipo.g Escuela de Tipografía de Barcelona
Tipo.g Escuela de Tipografía de Barcelona

=== Sweden ===
Södertörn University, Stockholm
Typsnittsdesign och typografi
Typsnittsdesign och fontutveckling

=== United States ===
California Institute of the Arts
Program in Graphic Design

Maine College of Art
Undergraduate program in Graphic Design (BFA)

Massachusetts College of Art & Design
Graphic Design undergraduate program (BFA)

Parsons School of Design, New York
Undergraduate Type Design

Portland State University
Intro Level Type Design Course

Pratt Institute
School of Art and Design

Rhode Island School of Design
1 Undergraduate and Masters Introduction to Type Design course

Savannah College of Art and Design
1 type face design undergraduate, 3 graduate level typeface design classes and 1 typeface marketing

School of the Museum of Fine Arts at Tufts University, Boston
Digital Type Founding: a fifteen-week course in type design
Instructor: Charles Gibbons

School of Visual Arts (SVA), New York
Continuing Education course in Type Design

University of Washington School of Art, Art History, & Design
The Visual Communication Design Program

Yale School of Art
Letterform/Type Design (showcase of previous work)

California College of the Arts
One class on typeface design, offered as an investigative studio in junior year

Type West at Letterform Archive
A year-long postgraduate certificate in typeface design grounded in the Letterform Archive collection of over 50,000 specimens from type and design history

California State University, Los Angeles
Typeface Design
