= Namsa Leuba =

Swiss-Guinean art director and photographer

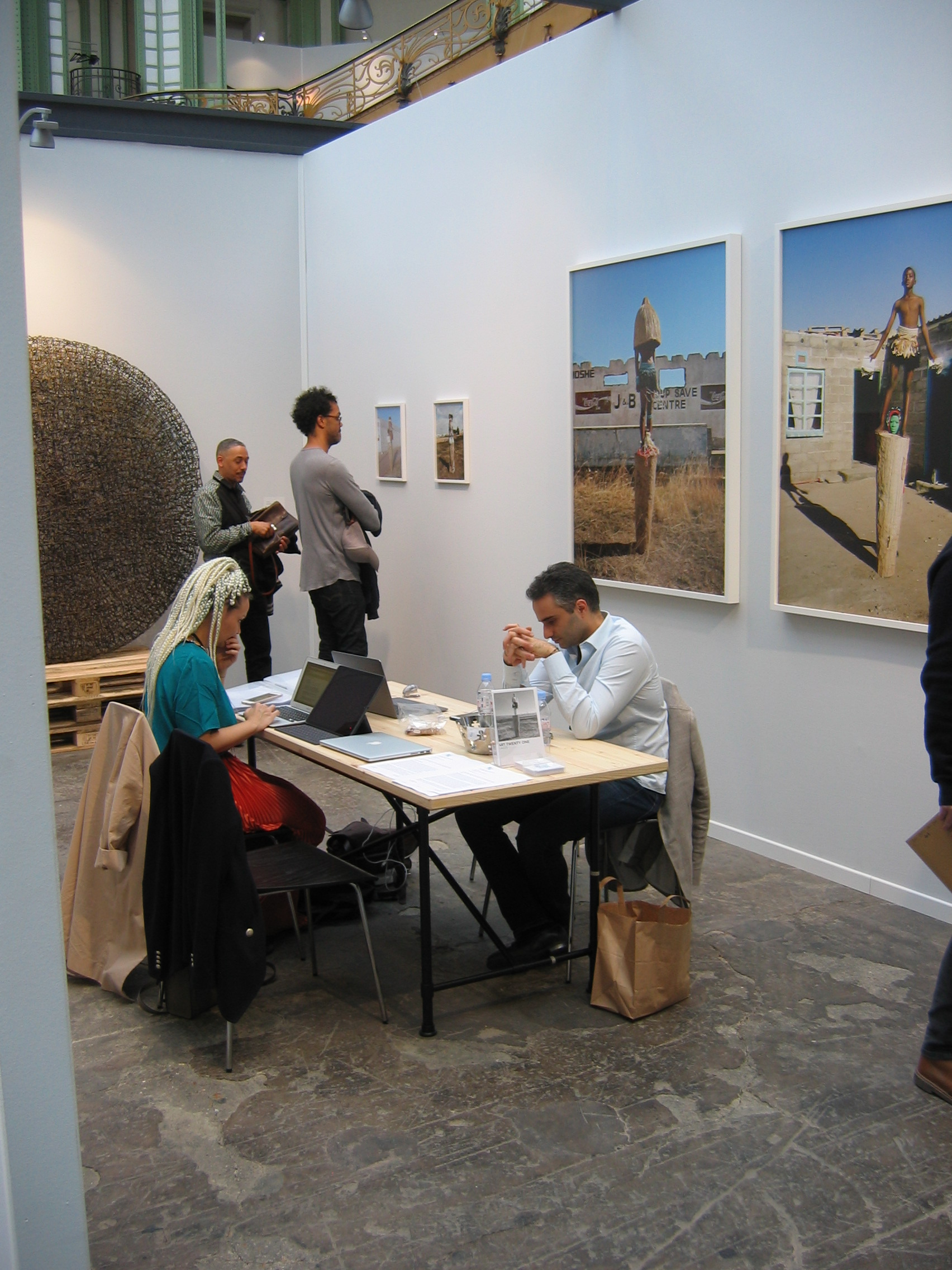
Work by Namsa Leuba

Namsa Leuba (born 1982) is a Swiss-Guinean art director and photographer. She studied at Swiss schools and afterwards at the School of Visual Arts in New York City. Her work mainly focuses on the African identity as seen through Western eyes, due to her Western education. According to an interview with “My Art Guides”, she became interested in the animistic side of Guinean culture as a child. She even visited marabouts because of her intense interest in supernatural side to Guinea. She has had her work published in several magazines including I-D, Numéro, KALEIDOSCOPE, Foam, the Financial Times Magazine, Interview, Vice Magazine, New York Magazine, Wallpaper*, Libération, British Journal of Photography, and European Photography. In 2010, she won her first prize from Planche(s) contact festival de photographie de Deauville. The subjects of the majority of her work are non-professional individuals. She claims that she does much of her casting on the street. In 2021, her work was exhibited at the Halsey Institute of Contemporary Art in a show titled Crossed Looks. It was the first solo exhibition of Leuba's work in the United States and included photographs taken in Guinea, South Africa, Nigeria, Benin, and Tahiti.

== Education ==
Leuba was born in Switzerland to a Guinean mother and a Swiss father. She graduated from Lycée Jean-Piaget, a French-language secondary school in 2002. She later graduated from the School of Applied Arts (EAA) in La Chaux-de-Fonds in 2008. In 2011, she earned a bachelor of arts with an excellent mention in visual communication, major in photography from École cantonale d'art de Lausanne (ECAL). She completed her postgraduate studies in photography at the School of Visual Arts in New York, called the PhotoGlobal Program. She later returned to ECAL and earned a master's degree with mention in art direction in 2015.

== Notable works ==
=== Ya Kala Ben ===
Ya Kala Ben is one of Namsa Leuba’s most world renowned works. Leuba carried out this project on a trip to Conakry in Guinea where she became interested in the construction and destruction of bodies. For this project, she studied ritual artifacts common to the cosmology of Guineans which were statuettes that had ceremonial significance. She recontextualized these sacred artifacts through a Western perspective. While doing the project, she was sometimes met with violent reactions of Guineans who saw her work as a sacrilege. Some were scared and others were stupefied. She was even arrested at one point during the project.

The pictures in this project depict disguised ceremonies, exorcism practices, in addition to acrobats who contort themselves into unique forms. The color palette of her pieces are desaturated with a classical composition. Greens are common in her photos as well as oranges and reds. Many images are in black and white as well. Images tend to focus on one subject, many being centered in the photo, often showing the entire figure.

In one image, name unknown, a tarp-covered figure is centered around a striking orange background. The background is entirely dirt. The tarp the figure is covered in is green creating a strong contrast. At the end of one of the figure’s tarp-covered arms protrudes three slender sticks that extend to the ground.

Another image, name unknown, shows a woman against a forested background. She is painted from the torso up in red and wears a red skirt with white frills on the edges and towards the center.

Other images are less staged, showing several members from the community inside that community. There are images of people walking through a marketplace as well as people getting ready to slaughter an animal. Each image carries great cultural significance with it.

=== The V.U.C.A. Magazine ===
The V.U.C.A. Magazine is a collaboration between Namsa Leuba and graphic designer Hugo Hoppmann and is an abbreviation for Volatile, Uncertain, Complex, Ambiguous. It was created during the summer semester of 2010 at ECAL in Switzerland. The magazine showcases architecture, design, and interiors based on the theme of Ethno vs. Modern. The majority of the magazine in black and white although several pages contain blocks of color.

== Work ==
Date	Name	Collaboration
Unknown	Ndebele Patterns	None
Unknown	Plantes	None
2010	V.U.C.A. Magazine	Hugo Hoppmann
2011	What We Want What We Believe In	None
2011	Deauville 2011	For Planche(s) Contact 2011- festival de photographie de Deauville
2011	Ya Kala Ben	None
2012	Cocktail	For WAD magazine n° 53
2012	The African Queens	For New York Magazine
2014	Zulu Kids	None
2014	The Kingdom of Mountains	None
2015	NGL (New Generation Lagos)	TZar, Tokyo James, Re Bahia, I Am Isigo, Deco, Maxivive
2015	Khoi San	None
2015	ISIGQI	None
2015	Tonköma	None
2016	The Kings	Christian Lacroix

== Awards and nominations ==
Year	Award	Category	Result
2006	l’art nouveau	Poster Project <<Sapin>>	Mentioned
2007	CIFOM	Website	3rd prize
2007	Hotel Beau-Rivage	Video Clip	3rd prize
2010	Planche(s) contact festival de photographie de Deauville		1st Prize
2011	Prix Elinchrom	Awarded to a graduate student unit photography has done an excellent dissertation	Awarded
2011	Prix BCV	To reward a student of the unity of photography who has made the overall quality of his work	Awarded
2011	Prix ECAL	Awarded to a graduate student unit photography has done an excellent dissertation	Awarded
2012	Hyères PhotoGlobal Prize		Awarded
2012	Photo Annual Awards	Emotion series	1st Prize
2013	Flash Forward Emerging Photographers Award	United States	Awarded
2013	PDN’s 2013 Photo Annual Award	PDN Photo Annual	Awarded
2013	Magenta Foundation’s prize	Emerging Photographers	Awarded
2015	Prix Pictet	Disorder	Nominated
2015	Foam Paul Huf Award		Nominated
