= Étienne Chambaud =

French artist

Étienne Chambaud (born 1980) is a French artist based in Paris.

He graduated from the École cantonale d'art de Lausanne (ECAL) in Lausanne, Switzerland, in 2003, Villa Arson, Nice, in 2005 and the post-graduate program of the École nationale des beaux-arts de Lyon in 2004/2005. He has exhibited at Palais de Tokyo, Villa Arson, Centre Georges Pompidou, Biennale de Lyon 2007, Netwerk, Espace Ricard, Kunsthalle Mulhouse, and The Drawing Center.

== Biography ==
Étienne Chambaud was born in 1980 in Mulhouse.

He graduated from the École cantonale d'art de Lausanne (ECAL) in Lausanne,Switzerland, in 2003 and is a guest lecturer there.

He graduated from the Villa Arson in Nice in 2005, and from the post-graduate program at the École nationale supérieure des beaux-arts de Lyon in 2004/2005.

He divides his time between Paris and Milan.

He is represented by the Esther Schipper gallery.
