= Studio Harris Blondman =

Dutch Design Studio

- Company type: Design studio
- Industry: Graphic design, Media & Interaction Design
- Founded: 2013
- Founders: Joris Landman, Harry Bloch
- Headquarters: Amsterdam, Netherlands
- Website: harrisblondman.com

Studio Harris Blondman is a graphic and interaction design studio based in Amsterdam, the Netherlands.

== History ==
The studio was founded in 2013 by designers Joris Landman and Harry Bloch.

== Work ==
Studio Harris Blondman works across graphic design and digital media, including websites, publications, motion graphics and exhibition design. The studio also engages in collaborative and institutional contexts, including acting as a partner of the Network Archives Design and Digital Culture (NADD), hosted by Het Nieuwe Instituut.

== Teaching and academic work ==
Harry Bloch teaches in the Graphic Design and Media & Interaction Design departments at ECAL / University of Art and Design Lausanne in Switzerland.

Joris Landman teaches at the Gerrit Rietveld Academie in Amsterdam, serving as initiator, course developer and lead teacher of Nerdy Arts (Experimental Interdepartmental New Technology Program), and as course developer and teacher in the Basicyear department.

== Awards and recognition ==
The studio has received several design awards, including:

- Swiss Design Awards, Media & Interaction Design (2024)
- Swiss Design Awards, Graphic Design (2018)
- Building Talent grant and Internationalization grant of Creative Industries Fund NL, Netherlands (2021)

== Exhibitions ==
- Lowwwe, Consulate General of Switzerland, New York, 2025
- Swiss Design Awards exhibition, Art Basel, Switzerland, 2024
- From the Rupture, Eyebeam, New York, US, 2021
- Demo (Design in Motion), Biennale internationale de design graphique, Chaumont, France, 2021
- Wir Publizieren, Kunsthalle Bern, Bern, Switzerland, 2020
- Swiss Design Awards exhibition, Art Basel, Switzerland, 2018
