= Jaime Hayon =

Spanish artist and designer (born 1974)

Jaime Hayon (born 1974) is a Spanish artist and designer known for his designs, interiors, urban installations, sculptures and paintings. His visual language plays with shapes, colours and recurring motifs. His work has been displayed in museums, galleries, and fairs in Europe, America, the Middle East, and Asia at the Daelim Museum.

Hayon's work has been the subject of several books and publications, including his most recent monograph for Gestalten. He received the national design award in Spain, in addition to other awards. He trained at the European Institute of Design in Madrid and then specialised in industrial design at the École Nationale Supérieure des Arts Décoratifs (ENSAD) in Paris.

He then joined Fabrica, a research centre of the Benetton group in Italy, where he headed the design department for four years. He worked with European design companies like Baccarat, Fritz Hansen, Cassina, BD Barcelona, Magis, Bisazza, Lladró, &Tradition and Witmann have relied on Hayon to create design collections.
He has also executed interior designs for hotels like the Standard in Bangkok, restaurants, museums like the Groninger Museum’s info center, and for retail establishments.

Hayon has created installation and exhibitions including the Swarovski Carousel, the Stone Age Folk installation and the in Trafalgar square, London. Hayon’s works are part of the collections of numerous museums, including the Groninger Museum in Holland, the Museo del Disseny in Barcelona, the MAD in New York, the Design Museum in Holon, the High Museum of Art in Atlanta, the Milan Triennale, the North Carolina Museum of Art, the Textile Museum in Holland, The Milwaukee Museum of Art.
He has been a visiting lecturer at the École cantonale d'art de Lausanne (ÉCAL) in Lausanne, REF the Domaine de Boisbuchet in Lessac, the Lodz Design Festival in Poland, the National Design Center in Singapore, and the Design Indaba in Cape Town, among others.

== Exhibitions ==
A selection of shows include:

2023

- Jaime Hayon MAD Brussels (September)
- Carate, paintings @ Mindy Solomon Gallery Miami, USA

2022

- Jaime Hayon: Infinitamente, retrospective at CCCC Valencia, Spain

2021

- Cosmotik Jungle, exhibition at L21 Gallery, Mallorca, Spain
- Swarovski Carousel, installation at Swarovski Kristallwelten, Wattens, Austria
- Masquemask, installation at Central Museum of Textiles, Łódź, Poland
- Chromatico, exhibition at Galerie Kreo, Paris and London
- Backstage, exhibition at Fernán Gómez Cultural Centre, Madrid, Spain

2017

- Merry Go Zoo, installation at High Museum of Art, Atlanta, USA
- Technicolor, exhibition at High Museum of Art, Atlanta, USA
- Stone Age Folk, installation at Palazzo Serbelloni for Caesarstone, Milan, Italy

2016

- Tiovivo, installation at High Museum of Art, Atlanta, USA
- Hayon DNA Gallery, Guest of Honor exhibition at Stockholm, Sweden

2015

- Funtastico, exhibition at Holon Design Museum, Holon, Israel
- Game On, exhibition at Galerie Kreo, Paris and London
- Urban Perspectives, installation, Milan, Italy

2013

- Funtastico, retrospective exhibition at Groninger Museum, Groningen, Netherlands

2011

- Testa Mecanica, exhibition at Glasstress, Venice, Italy

2010

- Smart Grid Gallery, installation for Enel at Salone del Mobile, Milan, Italy

2009

- Crystal Candy Set, installation at Baccarat Salle de Bal, Paris, & Rossana Orlandi Gallery, Milan
- The Tournament, installation in Trafalgar square, London Design Festival, U.K.
- Jaime Hayon, ceramics exhibition at British Ceramics Biennial, Stoke-on-Trent, U.K.
- American Chateau, exhibition at Spring Projects Gallery London, U.K.

2008

- Guest of honour, installation for Biennale Interieur, Kortrijk, Belgium
- Jet Set, installation for Bisazza, Milan, Italy

2007

- Bisazza: Hayon Pixel-Ballet, installation for Bisazza, Milan, Italy

2006

- Stage, installation at Aram Gallery, London, U.K.

2003

- Mediterranean Digital Baroque, exhibition at David Gill Gallery, London, U.K.
