= École cantonale d'art de Lausanne =

Art school in Renens, Switzerland

ÉCAL
- École Cantonale d'Art de Lausanne
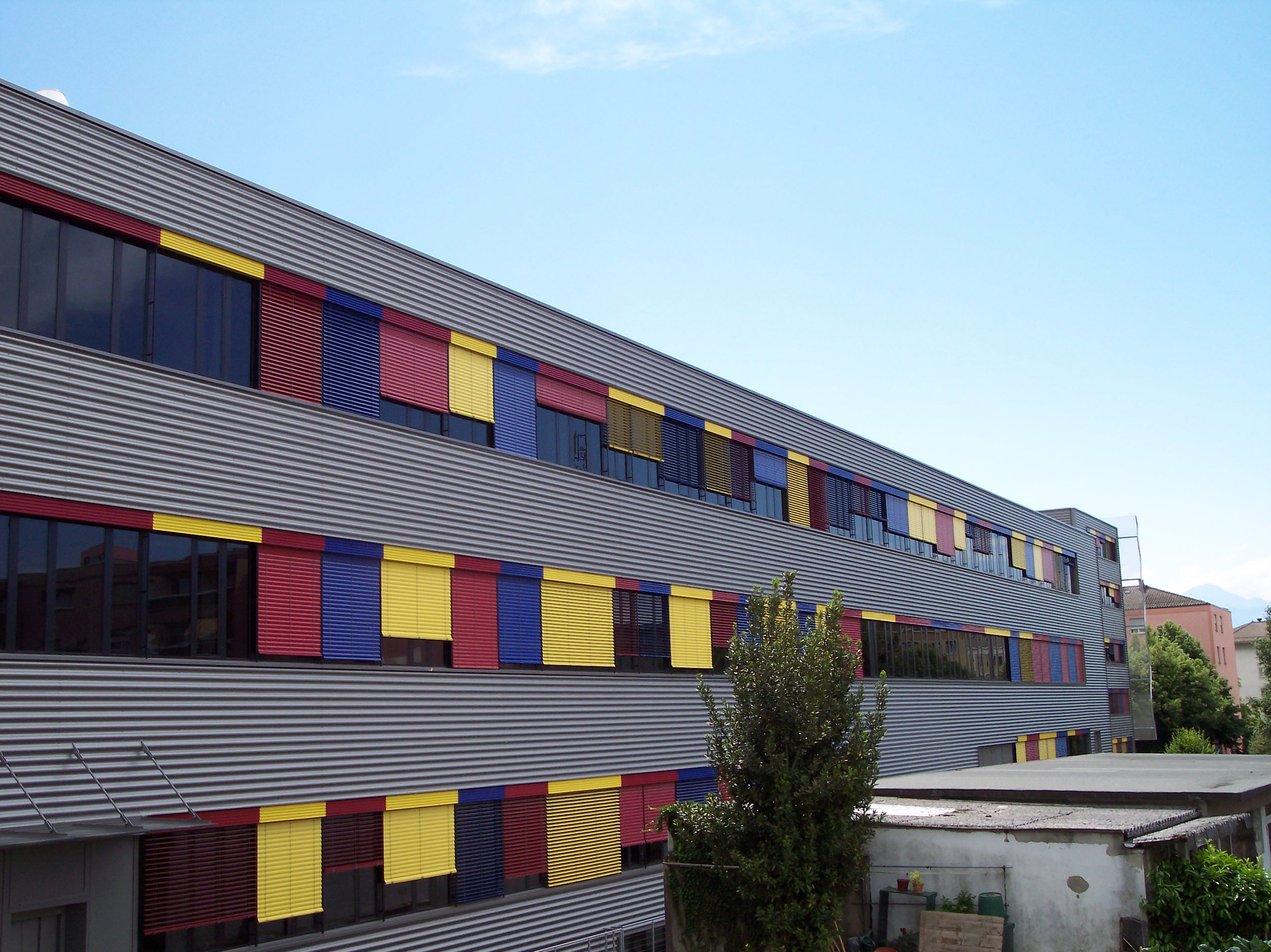
- Other names: University of Art and Design Lausanne
- Former names: Ecole Cantonale de Dessin; Cantonale School of Design and Applied Art
- Type: art school
- Established: 1821; 205 years ago
- Affiliations: University of Applied Sciences Western Switzerland; Swiss Federal Institute of Technology in Lausanne
- Director: Alexis Georgacopoulos
- Students: 600
- Location: Renens, Switzerland; 46°32′12″N 6°35′19″E
- Website: ecal.ch/en/

The École cantonale d'art de Lausanne (ÉCAL) is a university of art and design located in the Renens suburb of Lausanne, Switzerland. It was founded in 1821 and is affiliated with the University of Applied Sciences and Arts of Western Switzerland (HES-SO). The designer Alexis Georgacopoulos is the director of ÉCAL.

== History ==
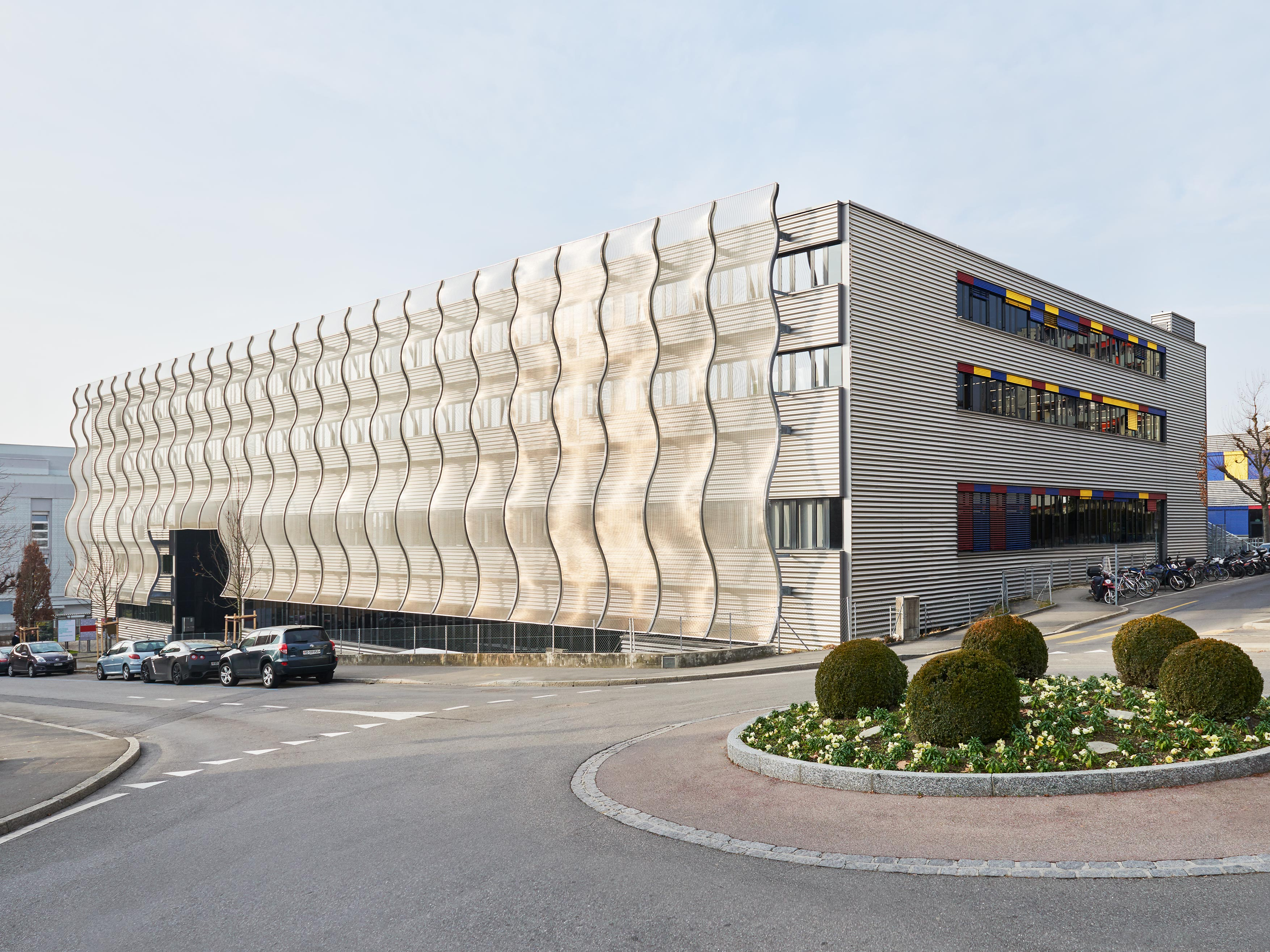
ECAL building

A precursor to ÉCAL called the "Ecole Cantonale de Dessin" was founded in 1821, and situated in Cité-Devant. The school was relocated to the newly built Musée Arlaud in the centre of Lausanne twenty years later. Over the next century the school moved to various locations and went through changes of management and name before eventually taking its current name and location in 1986.

Under the directorship of the graphic artist Pierre Keller from 1995 to 2011, ÉCAL became, "one of the world's most influential design schools."

The building in which the school is housed was designed by the architect Bernard Tschumi in what was once a pantyhose factory.

== Studies ==
ÉCAL offers a foundation year, bachelor's, master's, and master's in advanced studies degrees in different fields.

=== Foundation year ===
Preparatory year for students who wish to work in the fields of art or design. The course is designed to provide the skills required for a Bachelor's program at ÉCAL or another university.

=== Bachelor ===
- Visual Arts
- Cinema
- Graphic Design
- Industrial Design
- Media & Interaction Design
- Photography

=== Master ===
- Visual Arts
- Film Studies, in collaboration with the Haute Ecole d'Art et Design (HEAD) in Geneva
- Product Design
- Photography
- Type Design
- HES-So Innokick (Integrated Innovation for Product & Business Development)

=== Master of Advanced Studies ===
- Design for Luxury & Craftsmanship
- Design Research in Digital Innovation

== Notable alumni ==
Graduates of ÉCAL include:

- Alfredo Aceto, Italian and Swiss artist
- Fabrice Aragno, Swiss director, producer, and cinematographer
- Ini Archibong, Swiss-American artist and designer (ÉCAL adjunct lecturer)
- BIG-GAME(Augustin Scott de Martinville, Elric Petit, and Grégoire Jeanmonod), design company
- Claude Barras, Swiss director, producer, and writer
- Sophie Bouvier Ausländer, Swiss artist who received the 2017 "Grand Prix" of the Vaud Cultural Foundation (FVCP)
- Jean-Stéphane Bron, Swiss actor and film director
- Thilo Alex Brunner, Swiss industrial designer
- Irena Brynner (1917–2003), Russian-born American sculptor, jewellery designer, mezzo-soprano, and author
- Loucia Carlier, artist
- Rodrigo Caula, Canadien industrial designer and entrepreneur
- Michel Charlot, Swiss industrial designer
- Étienne Chambaud, French artist
- Jung-You Choi, Korean designer (Luxury & Craftsmanship)
- Claudia Comte, Swiss artist and sculptor
- Anne Crausaz, author and illustrator
- Caroline Cuénod, Swiss-Danish filmmaker
- Marc Decosterd, Swiss director, screenwriter, producer, musician and actor
- Andreas Fontana, Swiss film director and writer
- Gilles Gavillet, Swissgraphic designer
- Alexis Georgacopoulos, Greek industrial designer and ÉCAL director (2011–present)
- Christophe Guberan, Swiss product designer
- Moisés Hernández, Mexican designer
- Carmen Jaquier, Swiss film director
- Jonas Kamprad, Swedish designer and entrepreneur
- Milo Keller (1979–2025), photographer and ÉCAL professor
- Pierre Keller (1945–2019), Swiss graphic artist and ÉCAL director (1995–2011)
- Fiona Krüger, watch designer (ÉCAL adjunct lecturer)
- Thomas Koenig, artist
- Maria Jeglinska-Adamczewska, Polish designer (Office for Design and Research)
- Dode Lambert, Swiss painter and animator
- Bertille Laguet, Swiss product designer
- Nicolas Le Moigne, Swiss designer (ÉCAL faculty)
- Herbert F. Leary, United States Navy vice admiral
- Namsa Leuba, Swiss-Guinean art director and photographer
- Catherine Leutenegger, Swiss artist and photographer
- LeviSarha (Sarha Duquesne and Levi Dethier), design studio
- Emanuele Luzzati (1921–2007), Italian set designer, animator and illustrator
- M/M Paris (Mathias Augustyniak and Michael Amzalag studio)
- Romain Mader, Swiss photographer
- Youri Messen-Jaschin, Swiss artist of Latvian origin
- Sébastien Mettraux, Swiss painter, sculptor and engraver
- Carolien Niebling, Dutch designer
- Rachel Noël, Swiss film director
- Panter & Tourron, design studio
- Louise Paradis, graphic designer
- Nicolas Party, Swiss visual artist
- Michele Pennetta, Italian documentary filmmaker
- Léa Pereyre, Dutch costume designer
- Enrico Pietra, Italian industrial designer and entrepreneur
- Maxime Plescia-Büchi, Swiss tattoo artist, graphic designer, and creative director
- Anita Porchet, Swiss watch enameller
- Laurence Rasti, photographer
- Julie Richoz, Swiss-French designer (ÉCAL tutor)
- Maya Rochat, Swiss artist and photographer
- Adrien Rovero, Industrial designer
- Pauline Saglio, French artist and interaction designer
- Brynjar Sigurðarson, Icelandic designer
- Francine Simonin (1936–2020), Swiss-Canadian painter, engraver, and designer
- Annik Troxler, graphic designer
- Marie Velardi, Swiss artist
- Marcel Vidoudez (1900–1968), Swiss watercolourist and illustrator
- Hongchao Wang, Chinese designer
- Giorgia Zanellato, Italian designer

== Notable faculty ==
Partial list of ÉCAL professors, staff, and guest lecturers:

- Johanna Agerman Ross
- Yves Béhar
- Angelo Benedetto
- Camille Blin
- Harry Bloch
- Diego Bontognali
- Ronan and Erwan Bouroullec
- Pierre Charpin
- Kim Colin
- Alexandra Cunningham Cameron
- Konstantin Grcic
- Marva Griffin
- Mette Hay
- Jaime Hayon
- Anniina Koivu
- Max Lamb
- Sabine Marcelis
- Alberto Meda
- Guy Meldem
- Stéphanie Moisdon
- Adeline Mollard
- Marcello Morandini
- Paolo Moretti
- Ravi Naidoo
- Karim Noureldin
- Hans Ulrich Obrist
- Jonathan Olivares
- Eugenio Perazza
- Alice Rawsthorn
- Aurèle Sack
- Inga Sempé
- Wieki Somers
- Deyan Sudjic
- Alexander Taylor
- Yorgo Tloupas
- Skylar Tibbits
- Nicole Udry
- Patricia Urquiola
- Sebastian Wrong

== Exhibitions ==
An exhibition titled How to best teach design today? which explored the teaching methods and outcomes of the school was staged at the Vitra Design Museum in 2022. The book The ECAL manual of style: How to best teach design today? was published at the same time.

== Publications ==
- Bovier, Lionel (2007). ECAL: A Success Story in Art and Design. JRP Ringier. ISBN 978-3-90577-090-2.
- Georgacopoulos, Alexis; Herschdorfer, Nathalie; Keller, Milo; Broomberg, Adam (2013). ÉCAL photography. Ostfildern: Hatje Cantz. ISBN 978-3-7757-3725-8. OCLC 864435633.
- Benedetto, Angelo; Bovier, Lionel; Devaud, Vincent; Gavillet, Gilles; Dusinberre, Deke (2016). ECAL graphic design. Zurich: JRP Editions. ISBN 978-3-03764-455-3. OCLC 948440406.
- Olivares, Jonathan; Georgacopoulos, Alexis (2022). The ECAL manual of style: how to best teach design today?. London: Phaidon Press. ISBN 978-1-83866-517-3. OCLC 1280602474.

== See also ==
- List of universities in Switzerland
- List of art schools
- List of institutions offering type design education
