= Pernilla Ohrstedt =

London-based Swedish architect

- Born: 1980 (age 45–46)
- Education: Central Saint Martins College of Art and Design; Bartlett School of Architecture
- Occupation: Architect
- Website: Pernilla Ohrstedt Studio

Elin Pernilla Ohrstedt (born December 1980) is a London-based Swedish architect.

== Early life ==
Elin Pernilla Ohrstedt was born in December 1980. She grew up in Stockholm, and is the daughter of architect parents. She took a foundation course at the Central Saint Martins College of Art and Design, followed by the Bartlett School of Architecture.

== Career ==
She founded the London-based Pernilla Ohrstedt Studio in 2012.

In September 2013, the London Evening Standard included her in the ES Power 1000.

Her work has included the Coca-Cola Beatbox in collaboration with Asif Khan, a London 2012 Olympic Park interactive pavilion that can be played like a musical instrument. Together with Asif Khan, she designed the Future Memory Pavilion for the British Council and the Royal Academy of Arts in Singapore in 2011, "a two-coned structure made predominantly of rope". She created the Topshop Showspace 2014, "an indoor catwalk covered in real grass". At the 2014 London Design Festival, she created a stand for the MINI Frontiers exhibition to show how driverless cars will visualise 3D data and gradually produce a perfect digital model of a city.

Other clients and collaborators The Architecture Foundation, Storefront for Art and Architecture, Mark Ronson, the Canada Pavilion at the Venice Architecture Biennale, DAKS and Antipodium.

Ohrstedt was shortlisted for Emerging Woman Architect of the Year by the Architects' Journal.
