= Alexis Georgacopoulos =

Greek-French and Swiss industrial designer (born in 1976)

- Αλέξης Γεωργακόπουλος
- Born: 9 July 1976 (age 50); Athens
- Education: École cantonale d'art de Lausanne
- Occupations: Designer, university teacher, academic administrator
- Website: georgacopoulos.com

Alexis Georgacopoulos (born in 1976) is a Greek-French and Swiss industrial designer who is the director of the École cantonale d'art de Lausanne (ECAL).

Georgacopoulos has been actively engaged in the international design community, serving on juries such as the "Design of the Year" at the London Design Museum, "Designer of the Future" award for Design Miami, and the ‘’Design made in France at Maison & Objet’’.

== Biography ==
He was born in Athens in 1976, coming from a multicultural background. His father, a lawyer, is of Greek origin, and his mother, an interior architect, is from France.

He graduated from the Greek-French school, Lycée Franco-Hellénique Eugene Delacroix in Athens. In 1999, he got his Bachelor's degree in Product Design from the École cantonale d’art de Lausanne (ECAL).

In 2000, Georgacopoulos became the youngest department head in Switzerland, by assuming the position of leading ECAL's Industrial Design department. In 2006, he was awarded the prestigious Leenaards Foundation Cultural Grant.

In July 2011, Georgacopoulos assumed the role of director of ECAL design school. Since 2011, he has been actively involved in several projects, including the award-winning "Delirious Home" showcased at the Milan Furniture Fair in 2014. The Wallpaper magazine has recognized his contributions by naming him as one of the "100 most influential persons in the world of design" in 2015.

== Personal life ==
He lives permanently in Lausanne.
