= Black Crows Skis =

French independent high end ski brand

Black Crows Skis logo

Black Crows (stylized as blackcrows) is a French independent high end ski brand based in Chamonix, France, that designs skis, poles and technical outerwear.

== History ==
Black Crows was founded in 2006 by French professional skiers Camille Jaccoux and Bruno Compagnet, along with ski industry leader Christophe Villemin. Black Crows was born out of a desire to collide beauty and efficiency into skis.

== Products ==
Black Crows launched its first line of skis, the Corvus, in 2006. Since then, Black Crows has developed a range of skis for different skiers and styles, with the brand becoming known for their high-altitude skis. In 2012 Black Crows launched the freebird range for ski touring, in 2013 its first range of ski poles, in 2014 its first women's range, birdie, and in 2015, Black Crows presented its first outerwear range, Corpus. They also feature ski poles, like the Meta, and feature an extensive clothing line, with hoodies, base layers, and jackets.
