= Verne Ullom =

American athlete and coach (1922–1976)

Biographical details
- Born: March 16, 1922; Cincinnati, Ohio, U.S.
- Died: August 11, 1976 (aged 54); San Francisco, California, U.S.

Playing career

Football
- 1940–1943: Cincinnati
- Position: End

Coaching career (HC unless noted)

Football
- 1945–1952: Taylor HS (OH)
- 1953: Virginia (freshman backfield)
- 1954: Virginia (ends)
- 1955: Virginia (line)
- 1956–1957: Bates (line)
- 1958–1959: Principia Upper School (MO)
- 1960: Principia College (line)
- 1961: Columbia (line)
- 1963–1965: Colby (freshmen)
- 1966: Colby (defense)

Wrestling
- 1954: Virginia

Basketball
- 1945–1953: Taylor HS (OH)
- 1956–1958: Bates
- 1958–1960: Principia Upper School (MO)
- 1960–1961: Principia College
- 1962–1963: Bates
- 1963–1965: Colby (freshmen)
- 1965–1967: Colby

Baseball
- 1946–1953: Taylor HS (OH)
- 1961: Principia College
- 1964–1965: Colby (freshmen)

Administrative career (AD unless noted)
- 1958–1960: Principia Upper School (MO)

Accomplishments and honors

Championships
- Basketball; 2 MIAA (1966–1967)

Verne R. Ullom (March 16, 1922 – August 11, 1976) was an American football player and coach. Ullom played end for the Cincinnati Bearcats football team and was drafted in the fifth round of the 1944 NFL draft. He went on to have a career as an assistant football coach at the high school and college level and was also the head wrestling coach at Virginia and the head men's basketball coach at Bates, Principia, and Colby.

== Playing career ==
Ullom lettered in football, baseball, and basketball at the University of Cincinnati. He was drafted by the Brooklyn Tigers in the fifth round of the 1944 NFL draft.

== Coaching ==
From 1945 to 1953, Ullom was the head football, basketball, and baseball coach at Taylor High School. His football teams compiled a 59-13-1 record and his basketball teams won 89% of their games.

In 1953, he became the freshman backfield coach and varsity wrestling coach at Virginia. He became the varsity end coach in 1954 and was the defensive line coach in 1955. In 1955, he was a scout for the Cincinnati Redlegs. In 1956, he became the head basketball coach and assistant football coach at Bates. In 1958, Ullom became the athletic director at the Principia Upper School, succeeding Jim Crafton. He later moved to Principia College, where he was the head baseball and basketball coach and was an assistant football coach. He was the line coach at Columbia during the 1961 season. He returned to Bates during the 1962–63 season to fill in for head basketball coach Bob Peck, who was on sabbatical. When Peck returned, Ullom moved to Bates' rival, Colby, as freshman football, basketball, and baseball coach. He became the varsity basketball coach in 1965 and led the Mules to two Maine Intercollegiate Athletic Association titles. In 1967, he moved to intramural sports.
