= Brad Newsham =

American writer

Brad Newsham (born September 15, 1951) is a travel writer and activist from San Francisco, US. His books include Take Me With You in which he travels across the Philippines, India, Egypt and Kenya with the intention of taking one person whom he meets on his travels back to America with him, and All The Right Places.

== Life ==
Born the second of four children in Washington, D.C., Newsham grew up in Alexandria, Virginia, with his parents. His father was a CIA cartographer and both parents were Christian Scientists. As a boy of limited academic aptitude he was sent to the Christian Scientist Principia Upper School in St. Louis, Missouri, before attending Principia College in Elsah, Illinois, where he gained a degree in history and sociology in 1972.

After a brief spell as an asphalt paver and then the driver for a touring concert harpist, he spent seven months touring Morocco, Turkey, Iran, and Afghanistan in 1973. For the following eight years he worked as a dishwasher, school bus driver, construction worker, waiter, underground molybdenum miner, and small town newspaper reporter in Colorado, Idaho, and Arizona. In 1977, he built a log house in Idaho, with two friends to whom he later sold his share.

Newsham married his first wife, Beverly, in 1980 and spent six months traveling around the world visiting Hong Kong, Thailand, India, USSR, and Greece in 1982. Upon their return the couple moved to San Francisco, where he became a secretary at Wells Fargo Bank. The marriage ended in 1984 and Newsham traveled to Japan, China, and the Trans-Siberian Railroad before spending nine months writing about the journey. In 1985 he first drove a taxicab, a job he continued part-time until 2013. Random House published All the Right Places, the story of his Trans-Siberian adventure, in 1989.

In the same year he took his third trip around the world and subsequently wrote his second book, Take Me With You. The manuscript was completed in 1993 but it was rejected by a score of publishers. In 1995 Newsham married Rhonda Gillenwaters, and they had a daughter in 1996. Take Me With You was published by Travellers' Tales in 2000 and released in paperback by Ballantine (US) and Bantam (UK) in 2002.

In summer 2001 he received Philippine rice farmer Tony Tocdaan, whom he had met in 1988, as a guest in his San Francisco home. They then spent a month driving across America in a borrowed taxicab. This attracted significant press attention, and Newsham was able to send Tocdaan enough money to build a guest house to accommodate some of the many people who wished to visit him. On September 11, 2002, Newsham launched "Backpack Nation", a program in which backpackers bring donated funds to help people that they meet on their travels. He rapidly raised $20,000 (of which half would fund the travels of the "ambassadors" of Backpack Nation and the rest would be given to the "compelling Situations" that they found). The disbursement did not go smoothly so, in 2004, Newsham changed his process and invited backpackers to submit candidate recipients for which readers could vote. He selected twenty stories for selection and the top five each received $1000 donated by Newsham. In January 2005 he solicited more stories, from which he selected a shortlist of twelve to yield four $1000 donations. On June 1, 2005, the $4000 was disbursed and in September Newsham recognized that with no progress towards a project infrastructure Backpack Nation was too dependent upon his efforts and put the project "on the back burner".

=== 2006–07 – "The Beach Impeach Project" ===
Newsham spent the entire year of 2006 taking notes for a book he intends to write. The working title: "One Free Ride -- A year behind the wheel of a San Francisco taxicab."

But in October 2006, Newsham veered away from the book project and threw himself into the movement to impeach US President George Bush and Vice-President Dick Cheney. Six months before the November 2006 election (which gave the Democratic Party control of both branches of Congress), San Francisco's elected representative Nancy Pelosi, a Democrat, had famously said that "impeachment is off the table." Many Americans, including Newsham, passionately believed that the Bush administration should be held accountable for its misconduct in office, and considered Pelosi's "off the table" declaration to be an enormous—even unconstitutional—blunder.

Early on the clear, calm morning of January 6, 2007—just two days after Pelosi was sworn in as Speaker of the US House of Representatives—Newsham and a crew of volunteers outlined the message "IMPEACH!" in 100-foot letters that stretched for 400 feet across the sands of San Francisco's Ocean Beach – "Pelosi's backyard." At the appointed hour, a crowd of 1,000 people ranging in age from elderly to infant—men, woman, kids, combat veterans, people of color and alternative lifestyles—arrived and laid their bodies down inside the lettering. Photographers in two helicopters, including one from ABC News, captured spectacular images that were within hours published worldwide (on ABC, CNN, and in numerous newspapers), giving the Impeachment Movement some oomph—and some badly needed visuals.

Later in the year Newsham organized three more Beach Impeach events at various spots around San Francisco Bay. Photos and video from these events were used by Reuters, the Associated Press, the Christian Science Monitor, the San Francisco Chronicle, and in newspapers, magazines, and websites around the globe. Imagery and more details available at beachimpeach.org. Activists such as Cindy Sheehan and Cynthia McKinney joined him.

Newsham repeated the event during the presidency of Donald Trump.
