= Jim Crafton =

American football coach and athletics administrator (1924–2003)

Frank Koon
Biographical details
- Born: October 23, 1924; Kansas City, Missouri, U.S.
- Died: February 18, 2006 (aged 81); Godfrey, Illinois, U.S.

Playing career

Football
- 1947–1948: Arkansas

Coaching career (HC unless noted)

Football
- 1949–1951: Harrison HS (AR)
- 1952–1954: Arkansas State Teachers
- 1955–1957: Principia School (MO)
- 1958–1979: Principia

Basketball
- 1955–1958: Principia School (MO)

Track and field
- 1949–1952: Harrison HS (AR)
- 1955–1958: Principia School (MO)

Administrative career (AD unless noted)
- 1958–?: Principia

Head coaching record
- Overall: 77–133–6 (college football)

Accomplishments and honors

Championships
- Football; 9 Prairie (1959–1967)

James Blair Crafton (October 23, 1924 – February 18, 2006) was an American football, basketball, and track and field coach, college athletics administrator, and educator. He served as the head football coach at Arkansas State Teachers College (ATSC)—now known as University of Central Arkansas—in Conway, Arkansas from 1952 to 1954 and Principia College in Elsah, Illinois from 1958 to 1979, compiling a career college football head coaching record of 77–133–6.

Crafton was born on October 23, 1924, in Kansas City, Missouri, and grew up in Little Rock, Arkansas, where attended Little Rock Central High School. He earned an athletic scholarship to Louisiana State University (LSU), but was drafted into the United States Army after one year at the school.

During World War II, Crafton served in Europe as an officer in the Army. He played football at the University of Arkansas before graduating in January 1949 with a master's degree. Crafton began his coaching career later that year as football coach at Harrison High School in Harrison, Arkansas. He coached football and track for three years at Harrison. In 1952, Craft was hired as the head football coach at Arkansas State Teachers, succeeding Howard Montgomery. After three years at Arkansas State Teachers, Crafton went to the Principia School in Missouri as football and basketball coach. He also coached track and taught physical education at the Principia School. In 1958, Crafton was appointed men's athletic director and head football coach at Principia College. He also coached golf and track at Principia College before retiring in 1981.

Crafton died on February 18, 2006, at his home in Godfrey, Illinois. The Coach Crafton Athletic Center at Principia College was named in his honor. Crafton was buried at Arlington National Cemetery.

== Head coaching record ==
=== College football ===
Year	Team	Overall	Conference	Standing	Bowl/playoffs
Arkansas State Teachers Bears (Arkansas Intercollegiate Conference) (1952–1954)
1952	Arkansas State Teachers	1–8			
1953	Arkansas State Teachers	4–6			
1954	Arkansas State Teachers	1–9			
Arkansas State Teachers:		6–23			
Principia Indians (Prairie College Conference) (1958–1966)
1958	Principia	3–4	1–2		
1959	Principia	4–3–1	1–0–1	T–1st	
1960	Principia	5–3	2–0	1st	
1961	Principia	3–3–2	1–0–1	T–1st	
1962	Principia	4–4	2–0	1st	
1963	Principia	6–2–1	2–0	1st	
1964	Principia	6–3	2–0	1st	
1965	Principia	5–3	1–1	T–1st	
1966	Principia	7–1	2–0	1st	
1967	Principia	4–3–1	2–0	1st	
Principia Indians (NCAA College Division / NCAA Division III independent) (1968–1973)
1968	Principia	7–2			
1969	Principia	3–6			
1970	Principia	2–6–1			
1971	Principia	1–7			
1972	Principia	3–6			
1973	Principia	0–9			
Principia Indians (Collegiate Athletic Conference) (1974–1978)
1974	Principia	2–7	1–3	5th	
1975	Principia	1–9	0–4	5th	
1976	Principia	2–6	1–3	T–3rd	
1977	Principia	2–6	1–3	T–3rd	
1978	Principia	0–9	0–4	5th	
Principia:		71–110–6			
Total:		88–81–7			
National championship Conference title Conference division title or championship game berth
