= Principia College Historic District =

Historic district in Illinois, United States

- U.S. National Register of Historic Places
- U.S. National Historic Landmark District
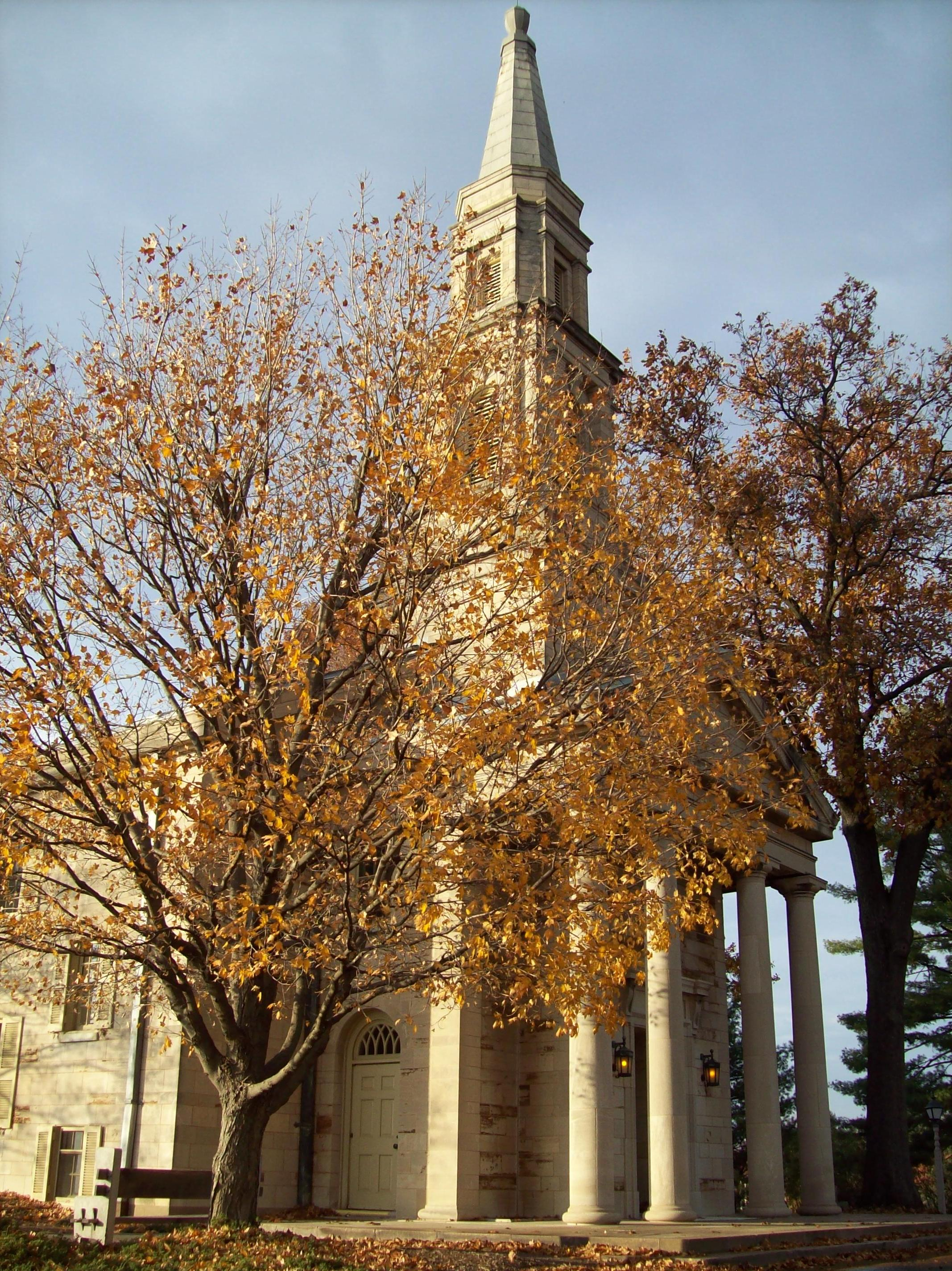
- Principia College Chapel

- Location within Illinois Location within the United States
- Location: Principia College, Elsah, Illinois, United States
- Coordinates: 38°56′56″N 90°20′51″W
- Area: 290 acres (120 ha)
- Built: 1940
- Architect: Bernard Maybeck; Henry Gutterson
- Architectural style: Colonial Revival, Tudor Revival
- NRHP reference No.: 93001605

Significant dates
- Added to NRHP: April 19, 1993
- Designated NHLD: April 19, 1993

The Principia College Historic District is a National Historic Landmark District encompassing the central portion of the campus of Principia College in Elsah, Illinois. The campus master plan, as well as eleven of its buildings, are important late designs of architect Bernard Maybeck, best known for his influential architecture in the American West. The Principia was declared a National Historic Landmark in 1993, and was also placed on the National Register of Historic Places that same year.

== Description and history ==
The Principia was founded by Mary Kimball Morgan in 1898 as an educational institution primarily serving the needs of Christian Scientists. Beginning with primary and secondary schools, the organization (unaffiliated with the Church of Christ, Scientist but operating with its approval) established Principia College in the early 20th century. Initially based in St. Louis, Missouri, the organization in the 1910s began to search for a suitable campus location for the college. A former country estate overlooking the Mississippi River just south of Elsah was purchased, and college president Frederic E. Morgan hired West Coast architect Bernard Maybeck to develop the campus master plan and buildings. Maybeck used the existing roads on the estate as a foundation, and laid out what resembles an English country village.

The centerpiece and first permanent building of the campus is the chapel. It was built in 1931–34 in Maybeck's conception of an American Colonial Revival structure, with a limestone exterior. Most of the other buildings Maybeck designed have steel frames and use concrete extensively inside, but have exteriors of stone, brick, and timbering. In the later phases of the campus construction, the onsite work was supervised by Henry Gutterson, who also contributed designs for several of the buildings. One architectural oddity on the campus is what is called the "Mistake House", which was used as a design and materials test vehicle by Maybeck.

== See also ==
- List of National Historic Landmarks in Illinois
- National Register of Historic Places listings in Jersey County, Illinois
