= Principia Astronomical Observatory =

Observatory in Illinois, US

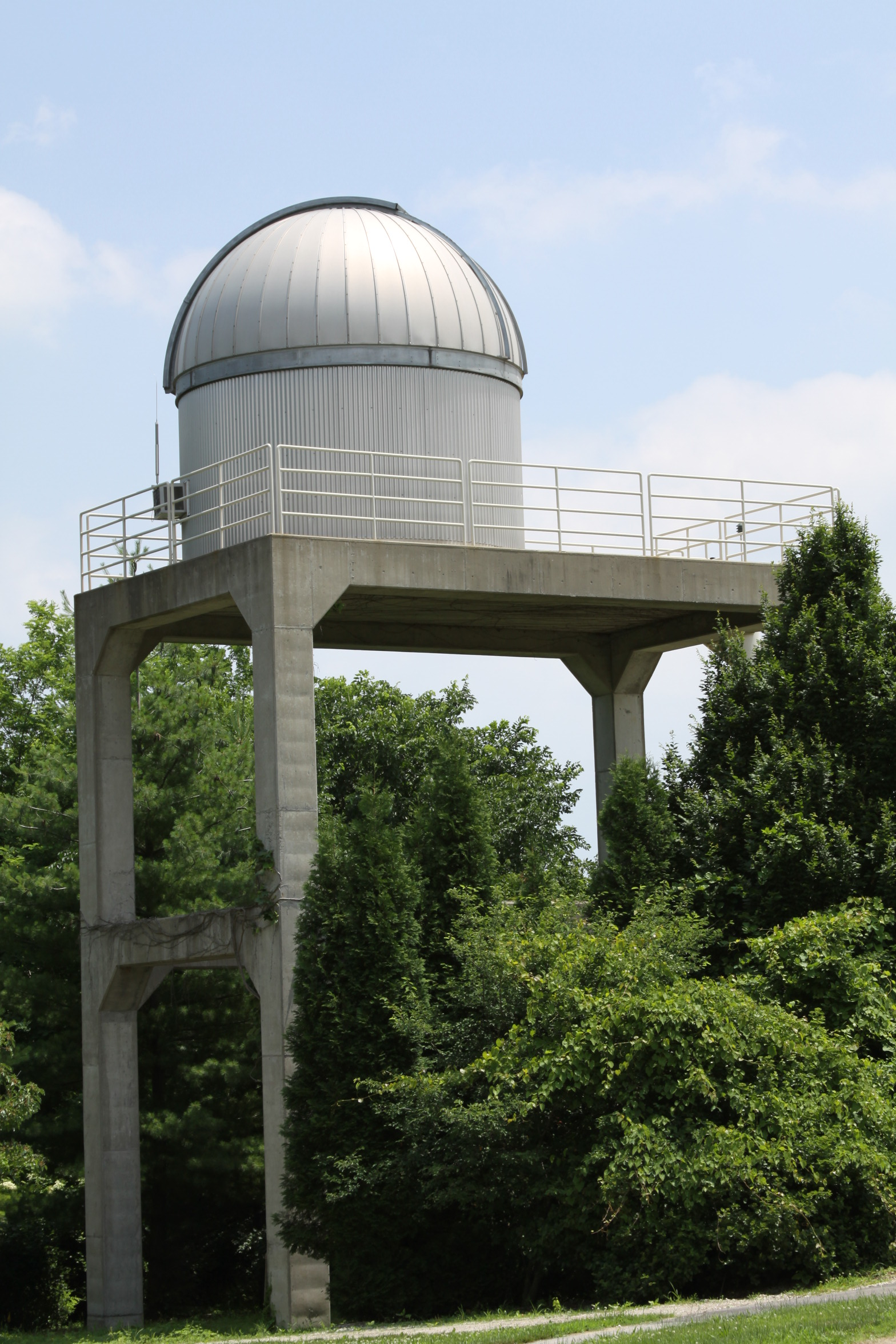
- Organization: Principia College
- Observatory code: 846
- Location: 1 Maybeck Place, Elsah, IL
- Coordinates: 38.950198°N 90.345101°W
- Established: June 18, 1998

Telescopes
- Ritchey-Chretien: 16 in mirror

The Principia Astronomical Observatory is an observatory located on the campus of Principia College, in Elsah, Illinois, United States. The observatory was installed on June 18, 1998. It features a 16 inch mirror and is of a Ritchey-Chretien design. The objective focal length of the telescope is 4000 mm. The control software is by the Telescope Control System written by Dave Harvey of Comsoft Software (of Tucson, AZ). The mirror was ground and certified by Don Loomis, former chief optician at Kitt Peak National Laboratories. The telescope was manufactured by Optomechanics Research.

It is the largest academic telescope in the region.

== See also ==
- List of astronomical observatories
