= Formula Sun Grand Prix 2013 =

FSGP 2013 was held at Circuit of the Americas in Austin, Texas. Oregon State University's Phoenix took first place overall, while Illinois State University's Mercury IV finished one lap behind in second place, and Iowa State University's Hyperion finished one lap behind them in third place.

| Rank | Team | Total Laps | Day 1 Laps | Day 2 Laps | Day 3 Laps | Penalty Laps | Fast Lap |
|---|---|---|---|---|---|---|---|
| 1 | Oregon State University | 193 | 65 | 66 | 63 | 1 | 5:26.565 |
| 2 | Illinois State University | 192 | 64 | 65 | 64 | 1 | 4:59.886 |
| 3 | Iowa State University | 191 | 61 | 52 | 78 | | 4:42.289 |
| 4 | Principia College | 184 | 56 | 54 | 74 | | 4:46.005 |
| 5 | Western Michigan University | 183 | 66 | 64 | 53 | | 5:36.894 |
| 6 | University of Texas | 121 | 34 | 42 | 60 | 15 | 5:02.661 |
| 7 | University of Waterloo | 20 | 0 | 0 | 20 | | 6:33.359 |
| 8 | Southern Illinois University Edwardsville | 10 | 7 | 1 | 2 | | 7:25.008 |
| 9 | Georgia Tech | 1 | 0 | 0 | 3 | 2 | N/A |
