= Mary Kimball Morgan =

Educator, school and college founder and president (1861-1948)

- Born: December 8, 1861; Janesville, Wisconsin
- Died: October 13, 1948 (aged 86)
- Occupation: Educator
- Known for: Founded The Principia
- Spouse: William Edgar Morgan (m. 1885)
- Children: 2

Mary Kimball Morgan (8 December 1861 – 13 October 1948) was an American educator and the founder of The Principia, a K–12 school in St. Louis, Missouri, and Principia College, a four year college in Elsah, Illinois.

== Biography ==
Nellie May Kimball, who went by Mary, was born in Janesville, Wisconsin on December 8, 1861. Her family moved to St. Louis when she was six years old, where she went to school and was active in the Methodist Church. She planned on attending college but was prevented by health issues. She married William Edgar Morgan in December 1885, but her health continued to decline rapidly. She was a founding member of First Church of Christ, Scientist, St. Louis, and in 1896 became a practitioner.

She began homeschooling her two sons, and soon was asked by other parents at her church to teach their children as well. She opened a home school in October 1898, hiring an assistant to teach the older children, and teaching the younger ones herself. Morgan called her school The Principia. In 1910 she added a two-year college, one of the first in America, which expanded to a four year college in 1932.

Kimball served as president of the school and college until 1937 when her son Frederic took over and she was named president emeritus. She died 13 October 1948.
