= Davis Allen (designer) =

American architect and designer (1916–1999)

- Born: Davis Brewster Allen; July 13, 1916; Ames, Iowa, U.S.
- Died: May 13, 1999 (aged 81); Fort Lauderdale, Florida, U.S.
- Education: Brown University; KTH Royal Institute of Technology; Yale University
- Occupations: Architect; Furniture designer; Interior designer

Davis Brewster Allen (July 13, 1916 – May 13, 1999) was an American architect, interior, and furniture designer. He was noted as a pioneer in the design of interior corporate environments and had a forty-year tenure at Skidmore, Owings & Merrill.

== Life and career ==
Davis Brewster Allen was born in Ames, Iowa and then lived in Illinois. He was educated at Brown University, the Royal Institute of Technology in Stockholm, and the Yale School of Architecture. He served in the US Army during World War II.

After first working at Knoll, and then with the architectural firm Harrison & Abramovitz, he moved to Skidmore, Owings & Merrill in 1950. He became a partner in 1965, and remained at that firm until his retirement in 1990. Paola Antonelli of the Museum of Modern Art described Allen's "contribution to defining the modern office" as "enormous".

In 1983 he designed the "Andover" chair for Stendig International. After Stendig was acquired by Burlington Industries, which eventually went out of business, this design was reintroduced by Knoll in 1993 as the "Exeter" chair. Allen also designed furniture for Steelcase, GF, Stow Davis, Bernhardt, and Hickory Business Furniture.

David Rowland, the designer of the 40/4 chair, gives credit to Allen, who "liked the design and immediately" and "put me in touch with GF", the 40/4 chair's eventual manufacturer.

In 1985, Allen was inducted into the Interior Design Magazine Hall Of Fame.

Examples of Allen's designs are in held in museums such as the Art Institute of Chicago, sought by collectors, and sold for large sums at auction.

== Publications ==
- Slavin, Maeve (1990). Davis Allen: 40 Years of Interior Design at Skidmore, Owings & Merrill. New York: Rizzoli. ISBN 9780847812554.
- Banham, Joanna (1997). Encyclopedia of Interior Design. Milton Park, UK: Routledge. ISBN 9781884964190.
