= Charles Stendig =

American furniture importer (1924–2024)

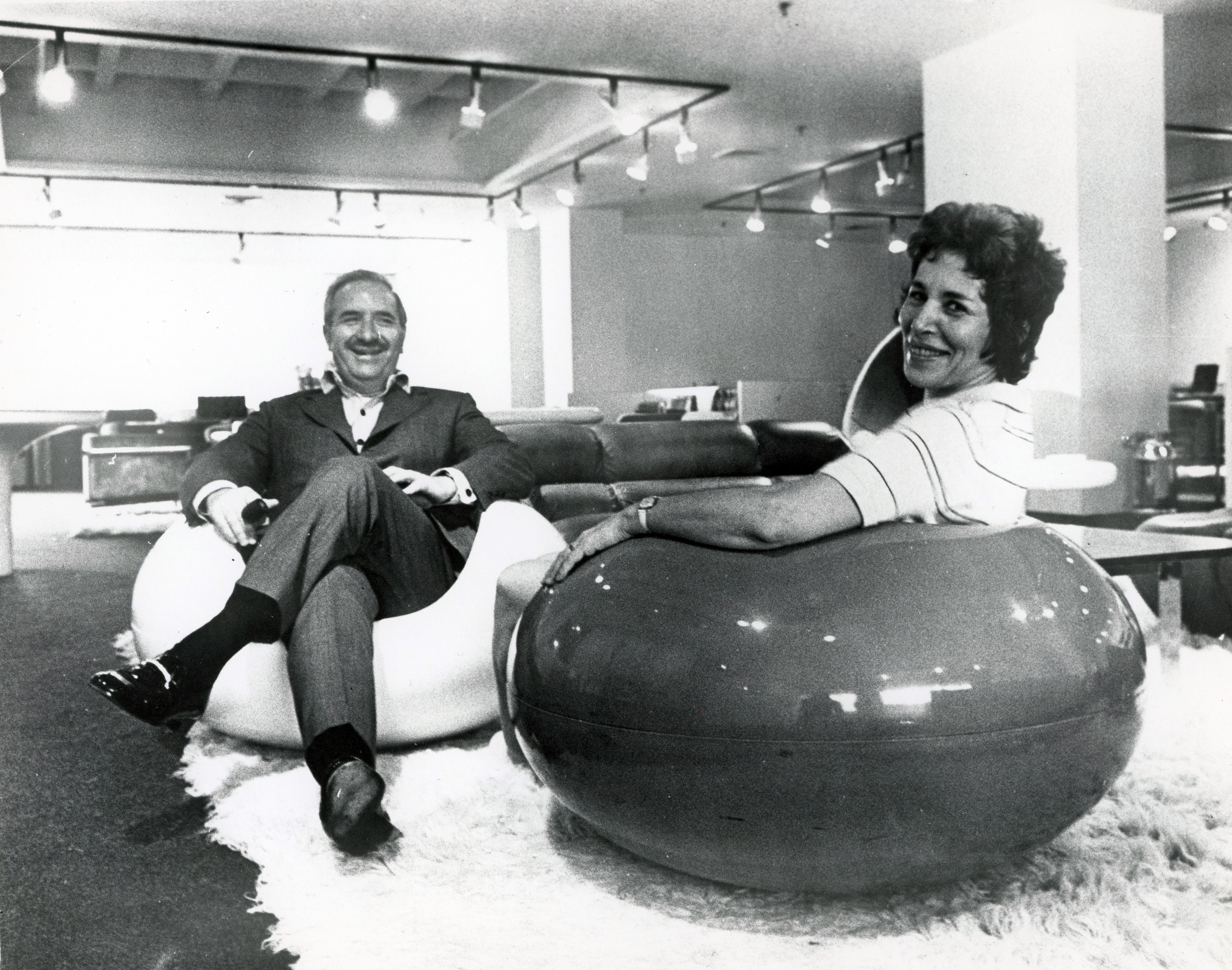
Charles and Eleanore Stendig at the Stendig, Inc. showroom, New York City, c. 1970. Photographer unknown, Charles Stendig Collection, R & Company Archives.

Charles William Stendig (October 25, 1924 – February 11, 2024) was an American businessman and philanthropist who was the founder of Stendig, Inc. The company was active between 1955 and 1976 and imported a unique selection of modern European furniture to the United States, focusing on contract-grade pieces suitable for commercial use (such as libraries, colleges, hotels, and offices). Stendig was among the pioneers of the movement that would later become known as mid-century modern.

== Early life ==
Charles William Stendig was born in Brooklyn, New York, on October 25, 1924, the only child of a union electrician and a homemaker. He served in an airborne division of the American armed forces during World War II and later studied international business at New York University (NYU), the City College of New York (CCNY), and the National Autonomous University of Mexico.

Stendig started his professional career as a "tail end" tradesman and eventually became a furniture road salesman, then a manufacturer's representative for several California furniture makers. During that time, he collaborated with Allan Gould Designs and Raymor, a distribution company that focused on modern china, glass, and accessories, best known for selling Russel Wright's famous "American Modern" line.

== Career ==
Stendig decided to start his own business in 1955. After a chance encounter at a bar, he connected with Finnish furniture company Asko, who invited him to Lahti, Finland, to work with the company's designers on developing marketable furniture to be sold on the American market. Joseph Carreiro, then Director of Dimensional and Interior Design at the Philadelphia College of Art (now University of the Arts), accompanied him on the trip as a design consultant, and shortly after that, Stendig, Inc. began importing Finnish furniture to the United States. The partnership lasted as long as Stendig was in business and included distribution agreements for works from Ilmari Tapiovaara, Tapio Wirkkala, and Eero Aarnio.

The company's first showroom was in midtown Manhattan in a brownstone building at 600 Madison Avenue, which opened in 1956. Stendig's wife Eleanore became the head of operations and stayed in the company until the couple's retirement.

On a trip to Zürich in 1957, Stendig stumbled upon a store with Bauhaus-inspired chrome-and-leather furniture by three Swiss designers—Hans Eichenberger, Kurt Thut, and Robert Haussmann—the last of whom owned and ran the shop with his brother. Until that point, their furniture was sold only in Switzerland, but Stendig became their exclusive U.S. importer thereafter.

That same year, Stendig negotiated a formal government invitation to travel to Communist Czechoslovakia, where one of the centenary Thonet bentwood furniture factories was located. This trip yielded him the right to import model B9 armchair, used by Le Corbusier in the 1925 Pavillon de l'Esprit Nouveau, and for which they found a signed mold at the Czech factory. He also secured the model 811 side chair, often attributed to Josef Hoffmann, and four other models, which ultimately contributed to a widespread appreciation of these designs in the American market.

In 1960, Stendig met Dino Gavina, founder of Gavina SpA, a furniture factory in Bologna, Italy. Soon after, Gavina came to America and obtained the distribution rights to Marcel Breuer's Bauhaus-era designs, including the Cesca, Wassily, and Laccio chairs and tables. Stendig then got the exclusive distribution of these pieces in the U.S. until Knoll acquired Gavina's company in 1968.

Throughout the 1960s, Stendig gained access to several other important Italian manufacturers and became the major source for radical design for designers and architects. He acquired exclusive distribution rights for the American market to models made by Poltronova, which produced designs by Archizoom, Gae Aulenti, Ettore Sottsass, Superstudio, and Massimo Vignelli and his wife, Lella. He also acquired Jonathan De Pas, Donato D'Urbino, and Paolo Lomazzi's Joe chair in 1970, which was a favorite for magazine photoshoots.

In the early 1970s, Stendig discovered Gufram, founded by the Gugliermetto brothers in Turin, and began importing the pop designs of Giuseppe Raimondi, Guido Drocco Franco Mello and Studio65, and others, icons of the Anti-Design movement in Italy. In 1973, Ceretti-DeRossi-Rosso's Puffo stool and Piero Gilardi's foam carpets were added to the collection. Other designers represented by Stendig, Inc. over the years included the Swiss Ubald Klug, Americans Davis Allen and Andrew Morrison, and the Swede father-and-son duo Carl Erik and Jan Ekselius.

Stendig believed that the company's visual identity should be at the same level as the furniture, so he hired innovative graphic designers to create promotional materials for the company. In its first years, Stendig relied on Ivan Chermayeff and Tom Geismar of Chermayeff & Geismar, who created the iconic S logo. Later, Massimo Vignelli took over and, in 1966, created the Stendig promotional calendar, a 3-foot-by-4-foot black-and-white grid of numbers and letters. The calendar was acquired by the Museum of Modern Art for its permanent collection that same year and has remained in print since.

In the late 1960s, Stendig's Manhattan showroom moved to a new location at 410 East 62nd Street in a 10,000 square feet space, while the operation expanded to include showrooms in Chicago, Los Angeles, and San Francisco.

Burlington Industries acquired Stendig, Inc. in 1971, and Charles and Eleanore continued running the business for five years before retiring in 1976.

== Death ==
Stendig died on February 11, 2024, at the age of 99.
