= Herbert G. Giberson =

American politician

Herbert Greeley Giberson (April 29, 1872 – August 21, 1930) was an American businessman and politician.

Giberson was born in Jersey County, Illinois. He lived in Elsah, Illinois with his family and went to the Elsah public school. In 1888, Giberson moved with his family to Alton, Illinois. He worked with his father in the merchandising business in Alton. Giberson also worked for a St. Louis, Missouri shoe company. Giberson took a business course at Shurtleff College in Alton. In 1899, Giberson served on the Alton Board of Education. He served on the Alton City Council from 1902 to 1904. Then, Giberson served on the Madison County Board of Supervisors from 1913 to 1915. Giberson was a Democrat. He then switch to the Republican Party. in 1924, He serve in the Illinois Senate from 1923 to 1927. Gibeson died at St. Joseph's Hospital in Alton, Illinois from complication after undergoing surgery for appendicitis.
