= Elsah Historic District =

Historic district in Illinois, United States

- U.S. National Register of Historic Places
- U.S. Historic district
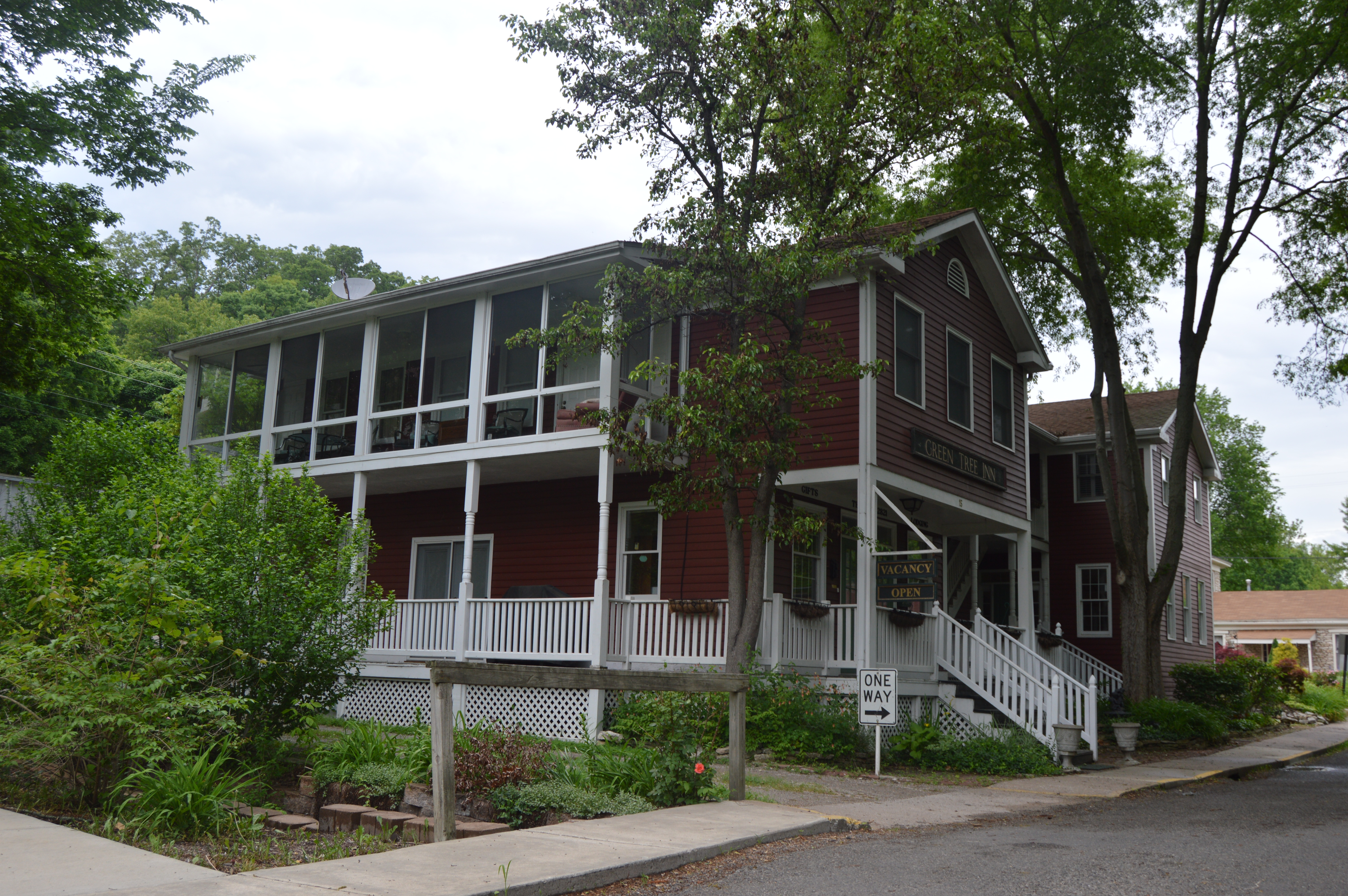
- Building at Mill and Selma Streets

- Location within Illinois Location within the United States
- Location: N of McAdams Hwy., Elsah, Illinois
- Coordinates: 38°57′15″N 90°21′37″W
- Area: 352.5 acres (142.7 ha)
- NRHP reference No.: 73000706
- Added to NRHP: July 27, 1973

The Elsah Historic District is a 350-acre (140 ha) historic district in Elsah, Illinois. The district includes 48 contributing buildings which reflect the village's period of growth in the 1850s. Elsah was founded in 1853 as a riverfront town on the Mississippi River; by 1861, it had grown to its current size, as geographic and economic limitations prevented further expansion. The town's 1861 appearance is well-preserved, and three distinct areas of the town have gone almost entirely unchanged since. The historic commercial district on LaSalle Street, which extends three blocks inward from the river, consists mainly of stone buildings; all but one of its pre-1861 buildings, including all four of the village's historic taverns, still stand. The other two districts are both located on Mill Street and are primarily residential; the larger one is three blocks long and has an assortment of stone and brick houses, while the smaller section has a single block of Greek Revival homes.

The district was added to the National Register of Historic Places on July 27, 1973.
