= David Rowland (industrial designer) =

American inventor and designer (1924–2010)

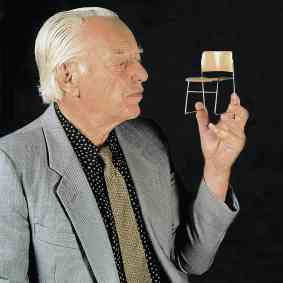
- Rowland holding a scale model of his 40/4 chair
- Born: David Lincoln Rowland; February 12, 1924; Los Angeles, California, U.S.
- Died: August 13, 2010 (aged 86); Marion, Virginia, U.S.
- Education: Principia College; University of Southern California; Cranbrook Academy of Art
- Occupations: Industrial designer Inventor
- Known for: 40/4 Stacking Chair; Softec Chair
- Spouse: (Miss) Erwin Wassum (m. 1971–2010, his death)
- Awards: Grand Prix, Milan Triennale for "40/4 Chair", 1964; First Prize, American Institute of Designers (AID), 1965; Austrian Gold Medal Award for Furniture, 1969; Gold Medal, Institute of Business Designers (IBD), 1979
- Military career
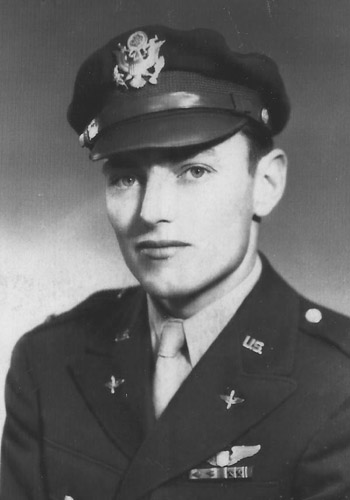
- Allegiance: United States of America
- Branch: United States Army Air Corps
- Service years: 1943–45
- Rank: 1st Lieutenant
- Conflicts: World War II
- Website: davidrowland.design ———————————

Signature
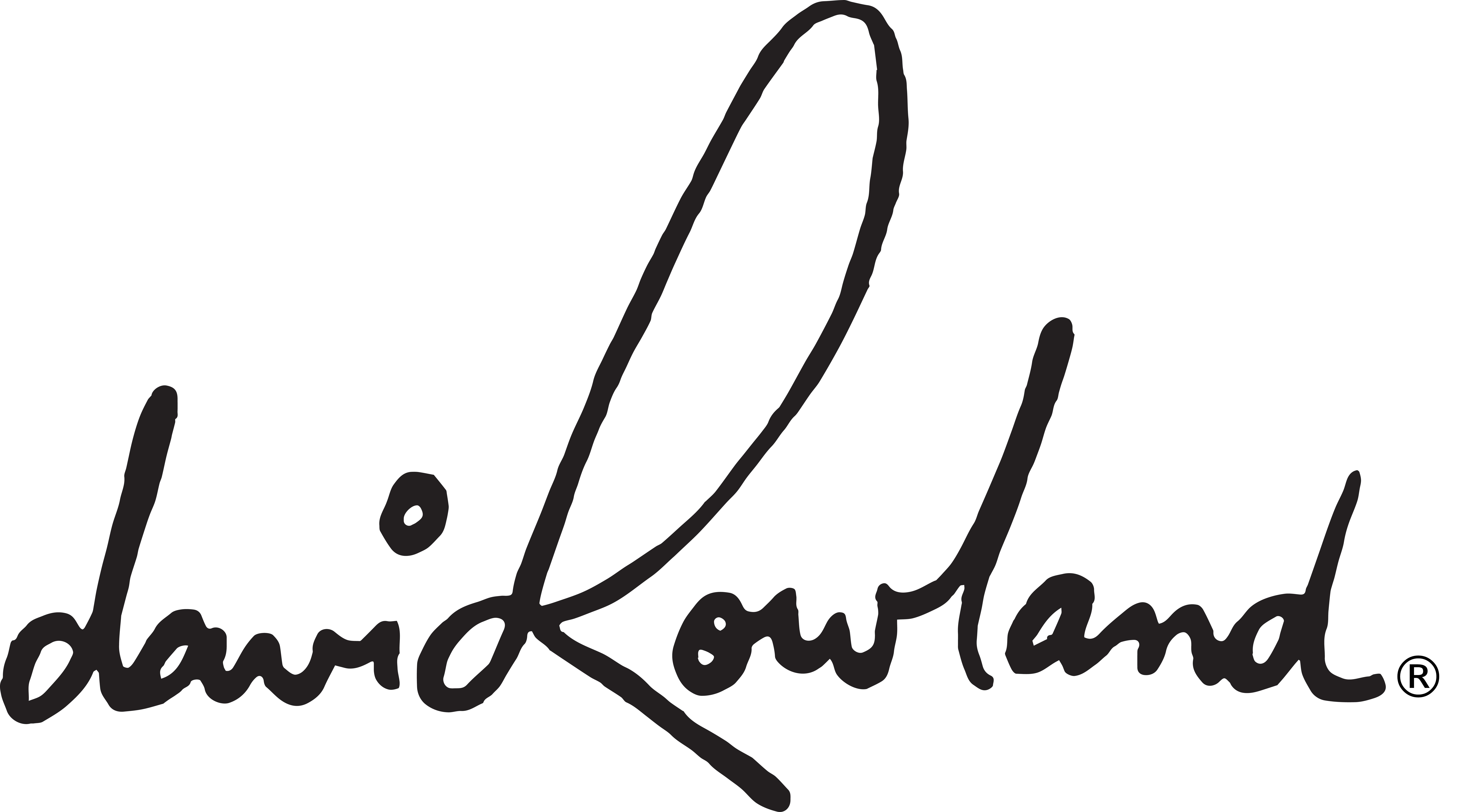

David Lincoln Rowland (February 12, 1924 – August 13, 2010) was an American industrial designer noted for inventing the 40/4 Chair. It was the first compactly stackable chair invented, and is able to stack 40 chairs 4 feet (120 cm) high.

== Early life and education ==
David Lincoln Rowland was born on February 12, 1924, in Los Angeles, California, the only child of Neva Chilberg Rowland, a violinist and W. Earl Rowland, an artist, lecturer and teacher. In 1936, he moved with his parents to Stockton, California, where his father became director of the Haggin Museum.

In the summer of 1940, at the age of 16, Rowland took a course with László Moholy-Nagy, one of the founders of the Bauhaus school, at Mills College in Oakland, California, on Basic Bauhaus Design. After graduation from Stockton High School in 1942, he studied drafting, and worked as a draftsman for the Rheem Manufacturing Co., drawing plans for war munitions, before entering military service in World War II.

From 1943 through 1945, Rowland was a 1st lieutenant in the United States Army Air Corps, the 8th Air Force, 94th Bomb Group, and 333rd Squadron, as a B17 ("Flying Fortress") pilot. He was stationed in Bury St. Edmunds, England, and conducted 22 combat missions. Rowland was awarded the Air Medal with several clusters.

After the end of the war, Rowland studied at Principia College in Elsah, Illinois, graduating in 1949. He went on to study industrial design at the University of Southern California and afterwards at Cranbrook Academy of Art in Bloomfield Hills, Michigan, earning a master's degree in Industrial Design in 1951.

== Early career ==
After graduating, Rowland worked outside of the design field and worked on his own designs in his spare time. He later took a job as head draftsman doing architectural renderings for Norman Bel Geddes.

Rowland also designed commercial interiors, including a Transparent Chair for the No-Sag Spring Co., a Zig Zag Cantilever Chair that was exhibited in 11th Milan Triennale in 1957 and a Drain Dry Cushion, licensed to Lee Woodard & Sons.

In 1956, the royalty income from the Drain Dry Cushion allowed Rowland to open his own office.

== The 40/4 chair ==
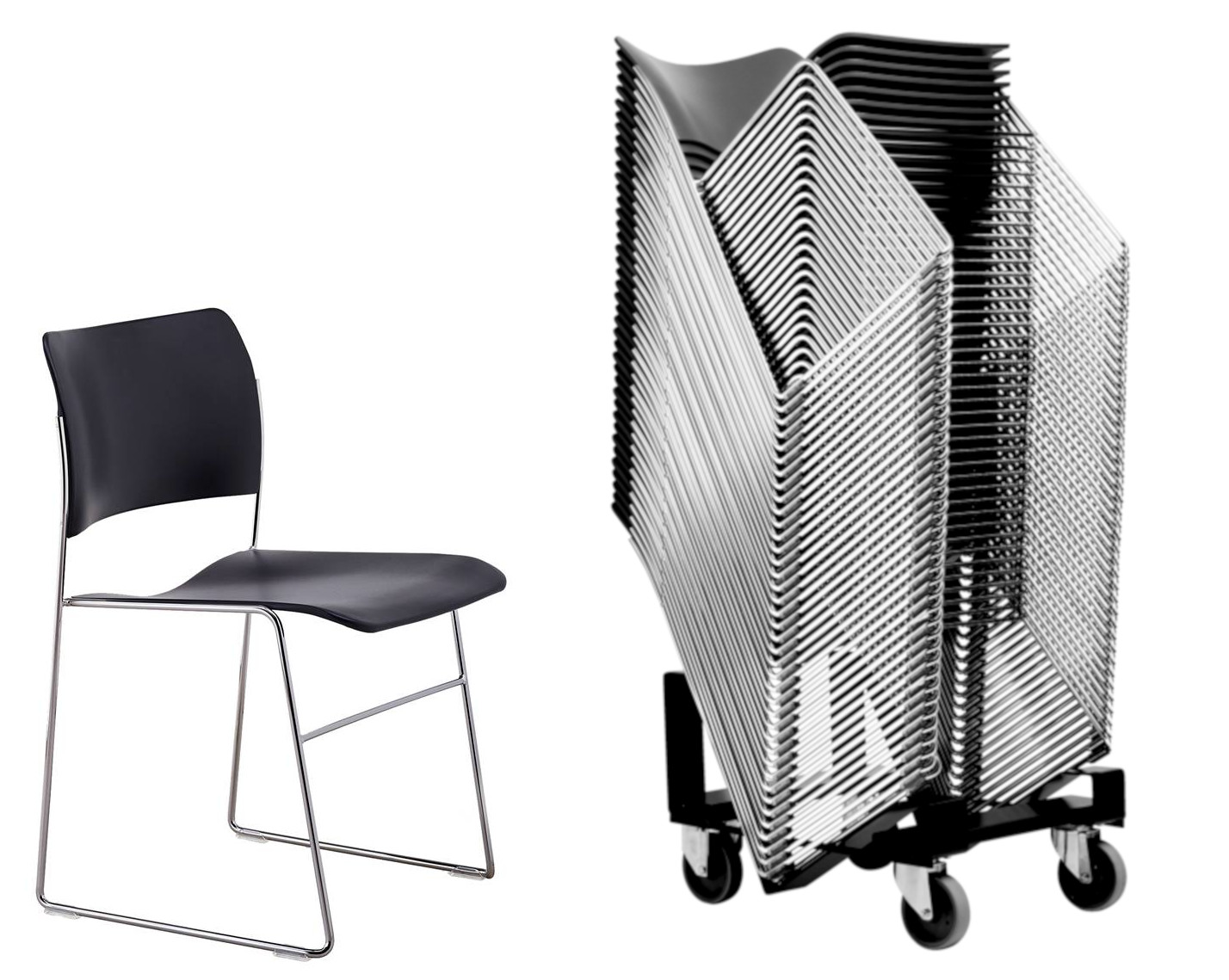
40/4 Chair with stack

Rowland developed the 40/4 Chair over a period of eight years, and was awarded a patent on it in 1963.

Initially, Rowland showed the chair to many companies in an effort to license the design. In 1961, Florence Knoll licensed the chair for her company, Knoll Associates, however canceled a license after six months. Rowland later showed the chair to Davis Allen, head of interior design at the architectural firm of Skidmore, Owings & Merrill (SOM). Allen requested 17,000 chairs for the a campus SOM was designing for the University of Illinois at Chicago (UIC). To fulfill the request, Rowland licensed the design to General Fireproofing Co. (GF) in Youngstown, Ohio. In May 1965, While the first order for was still being produced, 250 chairs were hand assembled and installed in the Museum of Modern Art (MOMA) in New York City for the opening of its new wing. MOMA also included the 40/4 in its permanent collection.

The 40/4 was an immediate success. It won the grand prize at the 13th Milan Triennale, and has been included in museum collections and exhibitions internationally.

Clement Meadmore, in his 1975 book The Modern Chair, described the chair as having "beautiful simplicity and total appropriateness". Twenty-five hundred 40/4s were installed in St. Paul's Cathedral in London in 1973, site of the wedding of Prince Charles and Princess Diana, and remain in use. The chair has been in continuous production since its introduction and has sold more than 8 million units.

General Fireproofing held the license for the chair from 1963 until 2002, when the company was taken over by OSI Furniture LLC. In 2013, Howe Europe (now Howe a/s) of Denmark, which had had a sublicense to the chair in Europe, Africa, Australia, New Zealand and Asia (except for Indonesia), acquired the license for the 40/4 in the United States and Canada.

In 2010, Contract Design Magazine named the 40/4 chair number one of the top 10 commercial interiors products of the past 50 years.

== Personal life ==
Rowland married Miss Erwin Wassum, a crafts designer, in 1971. They lived in New York City, before moving to Marion, Virginia, in 2001.

== Honors and awards ==
- 37 U.S. Patents and numerous international patents
- 1964 Grand Prix, 13th Milan Triennale for "40/4 Chair"
- "40/4 Chair" named No. 1 of The Top 10 Commercial Interiors Products of the Past 50 Years by Contract Design Magazine, 2010
- Design in America: The Cranbrook Vision. 1984 exhibition at the Metropolitan Museum in New York.
- Design in America: The Cranbrook Vision, 1984 book
- International Council of Societies of Industrial Design (ICSID) Exhibition, 1980
- Best of Competition Gold Medal, Institute of Business Designers (IBD) and Contract Magazine, 1979
- Design in America: The Cranbrook Vision. 1984 Exhibition at the Metropolitan Museum in New York.
- Gold Award for Product Design Excellence (Seating), Institute of Business Designers (IBD) and Contract Magazine, 1979,
- Meadmoore, The Modern Chair, 1975
- Austrian Government Gold Medal Award for Furniture 1968
- Master Design Award 1965, Product Engineering Magazine
- National Cotton Batting InstituteAward, 1958 for chair design
- Illuminating Engineering Society Award, for lighting design, 1951
- Best Piece of Business Furniture award from American Institute of Designers (AID)

== Museum collections containing Rowland's work ==
- The Museum of Modern Art, New York, New York
- The Metropolitan Museum of Art, New York, New York
- Philadelphia Museum of Art, Philadelphia, Pennsylvania
- The Art Institute of Chicago, Chicago, Illinois
- Brooklyn Museum, Brooklyn, New York
- Palais du Louvre, Musée des Arts Decoratifs, Paris, France
- Design Museum, London, England
- Victoria and Albert Museum, London
- Museu de Arte Moderna, Rio de Janeiro, Brazil

== Publications ==
- Rowland, Erwin; Schenone, Laura; Magnussen, Carl (2024). David Rowland: 40/4 Chair. London: Phaidon Press. p. 224. ISBN 9781838668129.

== Education ==
- Die Neue Sammlung, Munich, Germany

== Patents ==
- 1956 U.S. patent 2,731,076 Furniture Seating
- 1956 U.S. patent 2,739,010 Automobile License Plate and Fuel Tank Filler Spout Arrangement
- 1957 U.S. patent 2,784,773 Weatherproof Cushion
- 1957 U.S. patent 2,803,293 Spring Assembly
- 1963 U.S. patent 3,080,194 Compactly Stackable Chair
- 1966 U.S. patent 3,275,371 Compactly Stackable Chair
- 1966 U.S. patent 3,278,227 Compactly Stackable Chair
- 1967 U.S. patent 3,338,591 Dolly for Stacking Chairs
- 1968 U.S. patent 3,404,916 Compactly Stackable Chair
- 1969 U.S. patent 3,446,530 Nested Armchair
- 1969 U.S. patent 3,468,317 Collapsible and Stackable Paper Ash Receptacle for Cigarettes
- 1968 U.S. patent 3,408,179 Dispensing Package for Paper-Cup Ashtrays and the Like
- 1972 U.S. patent 3,683,938 Ash Tray
- 1972 U.S. patent 3,700,282 Seating Unit
- 1973 U.S. patent 3,709,559 Furniture for Seating People
- 1973 U.S. patent 3,720,568 Seating and Sub-Assembly for Seats and Backs
- 1973 U.S. patent 3,747,977 Seating Unit
- 1973 U.S. patent 3,767,261 Seating and Sub-Assembly for Seats and Back and Method for Making Same
- 1973 U.S. patent 3,774,967 Seating and Sub-Assembly for Seats and Backs
- 1974 U.S. patent 3,845,984 Folding Chair
- 1974 U.S. patent 3,845,986 Stackable Seating Units
- 1981 U.S. patent 4,304,436 Stackable Chairs
- 1982 U.S. patent 4,318,556 Chair and seat-back unit therefor
- 1983 U.S. patent 4,366,980 Stackable Armchair
- 1984 U.S. patent 4,456,296 Stackable Armchair
- 1987 U.S. patent 4,648,653 Stackable Armchair
- 1994 U.S. patent 5,320,049 Tubular Pedestal Assembly
- 2005 U.S. patent 6,886,890 Panel
- 2011 U.S. patent 7,871,131 Improved Panel
- 1981 U.S. patent D258480 Combined Seat and Backrest Unit for a Chair
- 1982 U.S. patent D262675 Armchair
- 1982 U.S. patent D262677 Chair
- 1983 U.S. patent D268798 Counter Armchair
- 1983 U.S. patent D271066 Armchair
- 1985 U.S. patent D280681 Tablet-Arm Chair
- 1993 U.S. patent D337003 Chair
- 2005 U.S. patent D503560 Stacking Chair
