= 40/4 Chair =

Type of stackable chair

40/4 chair
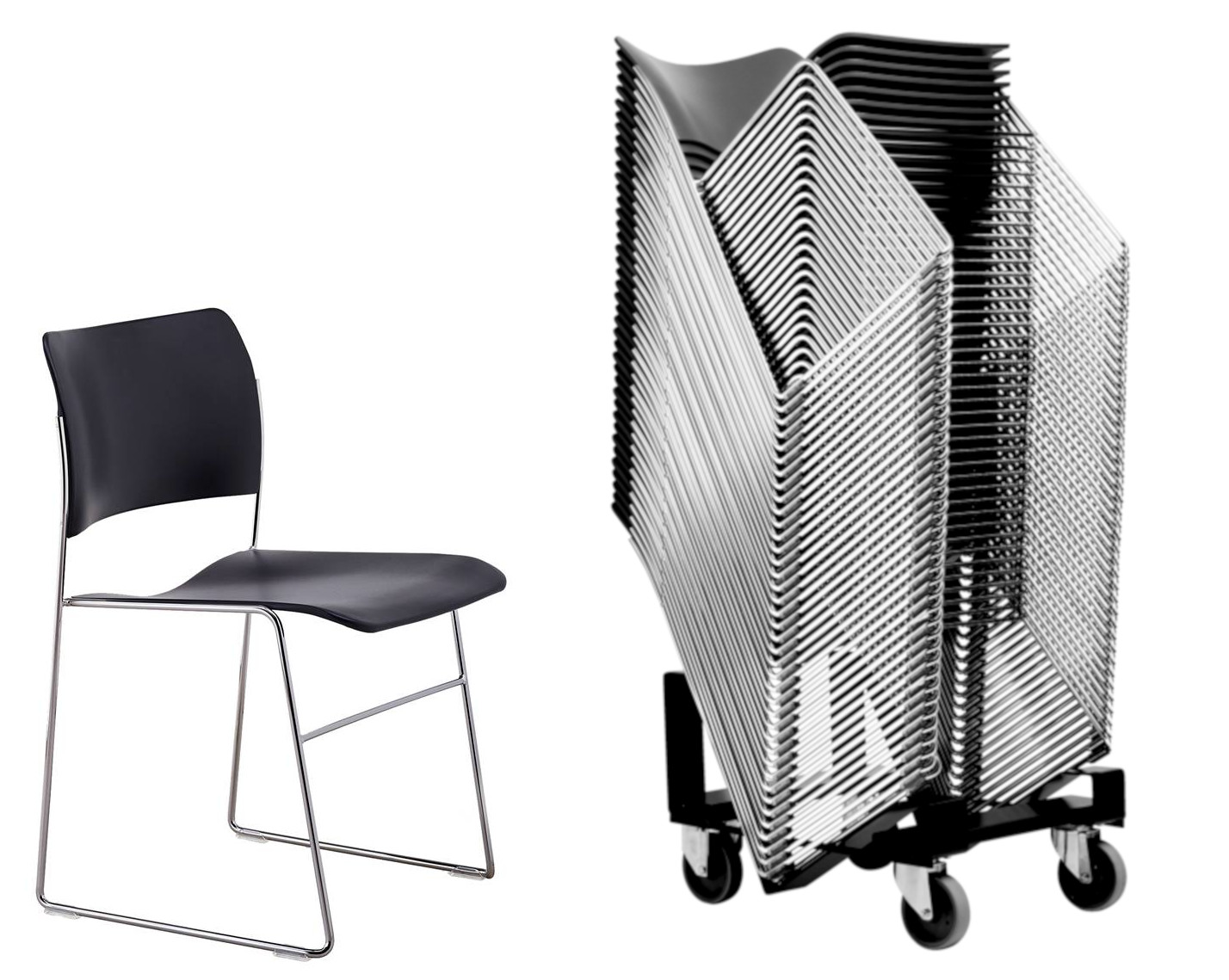
- The 40/4 stacking chair
- Designer: David Rowland
- Date: 1964
- Materials: Frame: steel rod; seat and back: coated steel, wood veneers, plastic resin, or upholstery (depending on model)
- Style / tradition: Modern
- Sold by: Howe a/s

The 40/4 chair is a compactly stackable chair designed by David Rowland in 1964. Forty chairs can be stacked to a height of 4 feet (120 cm), giving the chair its name. It has received many design awards and is in the permanent collection of the Museum of Modern Art in New York.

== Description ==
The frame of the chair is made of a 7/16" solid steel rod. The seat and back are formed from sheet metal with 3/16" rolled edges and coated in vinyl. Some models substitute wood veneers, plastic resin, and upholstery over wood as components.

Chairs can be stacked on specially designed dollies for storage and movement. Various configurations allow the chairs to be stacked in several ways to minimize the floor space utilized.

In 2004 Rowland worked with Howe a/s to introduce an expanded family of the 40/4 chair.

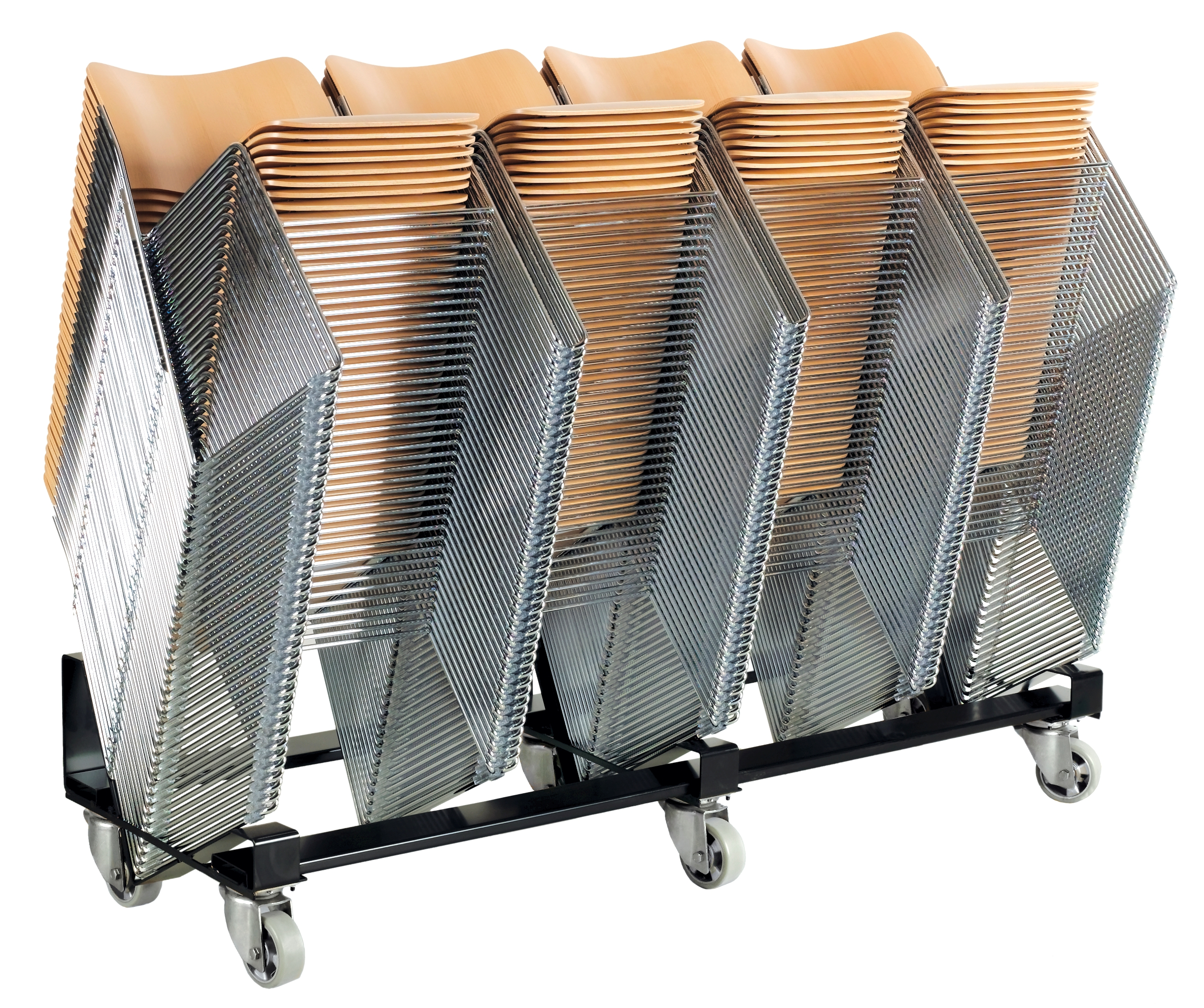
160 chairs on a quadruple dolly

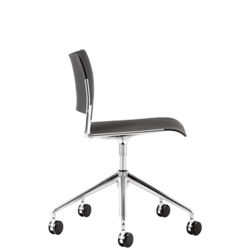
40/4 swivel chair

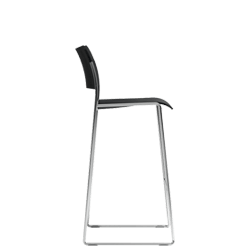
40/4 barstool

== History ==
Rowland developed the 40/4 chair over a period of eight years. In 1963, he was awarded a patent for the chair's design.

Initially, Rowland showed the chair to many companies in an effort to license the design. In 1961, Florence Knoll licensed the chair for her company, Knoll Associates; however, she canceled the license after six months. Rowland later showed the chair to Davis Allen, head of interior design at the architectural firm of Skidmore, Owings & Merrill (SOM). Allen requested 17,000 chairs for the campus SOM that was being designed for the University of Illinois at Chicago (UIC). To fulfill the request, Rowland licensed the design to General Fireproofing Co. (GF) in Youngstown, Ohio. In May 1965, while the first order was still being produced, 250 chairs were hand assembled and installed in the Museum of Modern Art in New York City for the opening of its new wing.

The 40/4 was an immediate success. It won the grand prize at the prestigious 13th Milan Triennale, and has been included in museum collections and exhibitions internationally.

In the book The Modern Chair, Clement Meadmore described the chair as having "beautiful simplicity and total appropriateness." In 1973, 2,500 of the chairs were installed in St. Paul's Cathedral in London, which was in 1981 the site of Prince Charles and Princess Diana's wedding. In 2001, it was named #1 of "The Top 10 Commercial Interiors products of the Past 50 Years" by Contract Design Magazine.

The chair has been in continuous production since its introduction and has sold over 8 million units.

General Fireproofing held the license for the chair from 1963 until 2002 when the company was taken over by OSI Furniture LLC. In 2013, Howe Europe, (now Howe a/s), of Denmark, which had had a sublicense to the chair in Europe, Africa, Australia, New Zealand and Asia (except for Indonesia) acquired the license for the 40/4 in the United States and Canada. In Indonesia, PT. Indovickers Furnitama holds the license, and also produces the 40/4 in a rattan version.

== Awards and recognition ==
- Grand Prize at the 13th Triennale in Milan, Italy, 1964
- International Design Award, American Institute of Interior Designers (A.I.D.), 1965
- Master Design Award from Product Engineering Magazine, 1965
- Gold Medal Award for Furniture from the Austrian Government, 1968
- Industrial Design Award, International Biennial Exhibition, Rio de Janeiro, 1968
- Design in America: The Cranbrook Vision 1925–1950 exhibition, Metropolitan Museum of Art, New York, 1984
- "The Modern Chair" exhibition, The Art Institute, Chicago, Illinois
- "Please Be Seated" exhibition, Smithsonian Institution, Washington D.C.
- U.S. Industrial Design exhibit at XIX Olympiad Games, Mexico City
- Dimensions of Design exhibition – 100 Classical Seats, Vitra Design Museum
- The Product of Design exhibition, Katonah Gallery, Westchester, New York
- Number 1 of The Top 10 Commercial Interiors Products of the Past 50 Years, Contract Magazine, 2010

== Curated examples ==
- The Museum of Modern Art (MoMA), New York, New York
- The Metropolitan Museum of Art, New York, New York
- The Palais du Louvre, Musée des Arts Decoratifs, Paris, France
- The Victoria and Albert Museum, London, England
- The Design Museum, London, England
- The University of Dundee Museum, Dundee, Scotland
- Die Neue Sammlung, Munich, Germany
- The Museu de Arte Moderna, Rio de Janeiro, Brazil
- The Art Institute of Chicago, Chicago, Illinois
- The Philadelphia Museum of Art, Philadelphia, Pennsylvania
- Cranbrook Academy of Art Museum, Bloomfield Hills, Michigan
- Musée des Arts Decoratifs, Montreal, Canada

== See also ==
- Industrial design
