= Robert Bruegmann =

Robert Bruegmann is an historian of architecture, landscape and the built environment. He is a professor at the University of Illinois at Chicago, and a specialist on the Chicago school of architecture. Bruegmann is best known for his research on the architectural firm of Holabird & Root, and is also a commentator on urban sprawl.

== Life and career ==
Bruegmann received his B.A. from Principia College in 1970 and his Ph.D. from the University of Pennsylvania in 1976 with a dissertation on late 18th and early 19th century European hospitals and other institutions. In 1977 he became assistant professor in the Art History Department at the University of Illinois at Chicago, where he is currently professor with appointments in the School of Architecture and Urban Planning and Policy. He also taught at the University of Pennsylvania, Philadelphia College of the Arts, the Massachusetts Institute of Technology and Columbia University, and has worked for the Historic American Buildings Survey of the National Park Service.

Bruegmann's fields of research and teaching are architectural, urban, landscape, and planning history and historical preservation. He has received scholarships and fellowships from the National Endowment for the Humanities, the Graham Foundation, the Buell Center for the study of American Architecture at Columbia University and the Institute for the Humanities and the Great Cities Institute at the University of Illinois at Chicago. His research on Holabird & Root (earlier known as Holabird & Roche) in the 1980s improved public awareness of that firm's contributions to the commercial architecture of Chicago and other cities. A comprehensive three-volume catalog of the firm's commissions from 1910-1940 was followed by a book describing the firm's first four decades and influence on Chicago.

In recent years Bruegmann has been examining the issue of urban sprawl. His 2005 book, Sprawl: A Compact History, takes a contrarian view, offering statistical and historical arguments to challenge the most frequently offered criticisms of dispersed development patterns as environmental harmful, unhealthy, and undesirable. The book was widely discussed.

Other works by Bruegmann recount the architectural history of Benicia, California, and of the United States Air Force Academy.

== Partial bibliography ==
- Benicia: Portrait of an Early California Town: An Architectural History 1846 to the Present San Francisco: 101 Productions, 1980.
- A Guide to 150 Years of Chicago Architecture (With Paul Florian and Cynthia Weese). Chicago Review Press, 1985
- Holabird & Roche/Holabird & Root, Catalog of Work 1910-1940 Three volumes, New York: Garland Publishing Co., 1991.
- Modernism at Mid-Century: The Architecture of the United States Air Force Academy (editor). University of Chicago Press, 1994.
- Ralph Johnson of Perkins & Will: Buildings and Projects (with Ralph Johnson). New York: Rizzoli, 1995
- The Architects and the City: Holabird and Roche of Chicago 1880-1918 University of Chicago Press, 1997
- Sprawl: A Compact History University of Chicago Press, 2005
- The Architecture of Harry Wees New York: W. W. Norton, 2010
