= The Principia =

Christian Scientists educational institute

- Motto: As The Sowing, The Reaping
- Type: Private school, private college
- Established: 1898
- Undergraduates: 480
- Location: Elsah Campus Elsah, Illinois and St. Louis Campus Town and Country, Missouri, United States
- Campus: 2 campuses
- Colors: Blue & gold
- Website: The Principia

The Principia is an educational institution historically affiliated with Christian Science. It is located on two campuses in the St. Louis, Missouri metropolitan area of the United States. Principia School, located in Town and Country, West St. Louis County, serves students from early childhood through high school, and Principia College, located about 30 miles away, is on the bluffs overlooking the Mississippi River in Elsah, Illinois.

== History ==
Founded by Mary Kimball Morgan, Principia School was officially opened in 1898 in St. Louis. By 1906, Principia had graduated its first high school class and in 1912, the Junior College was added, becoming one of the first such colleges in America. The year 1917 marked the first graduation ceremony of alumni from the Junior College. In 1934 Principia College awarded its first bachelor's degrees. Principia College students moved to Elsah, Illinois, in February, 1935. Principia School later moved to its current location in the St. Louis suburb of Town and Country, Missouri in 1959.

Connection with other schools

When two other schools began, Claremont Fan Court School and Huntingtower School, they used the ideas which Principia is founded on as an example.

== Institutions ==
=== Principia School ===
All three schools of Principia School are located on a 360-acre campus in the St. Louis suburb of Town and Country. Principia School follows a British-style organization and as such its schools are as follows:

- Lower School
- Middle School
- Upper School

=== Principia College ===
Principia College is a private liberal-arts undergraduate college located on the bluffs of the Mississippi River in Elsah, Illinois. The college does not offer graduate programs. The school offers various B.A. and B.S. majors, comprehensive experiential programs, and study abroad and field programs. It has a high participation in athletic programs, and is remarkable for its small size.

Distinguished architect Bernard R. Maybeck, of Maybeck and White, worked through his largest design commission during the original construction phases of Principia College. Principia College was designated a National Historic Landmark and placed on the Registrar of Historic Places in 1993.

== Alumni ==
This is a list of notable Principia alumni. (US) refers to Principia Upper School and (C) refers to Principia College. For another list of Principia College alumni, see Principia College.

- John Andrews (US, C), politician
- Robert Bruegmann (C), historian
- Chandler Burr (C), journalist and author
- Ron Charles (US, C), book critic
- Candy Crowley (attended C), news anchor
- Ann Dunnigan (attended C), actor and translator
- Robert Duvall (US, C), actor and filmmaker; Academy Award and Golden Globe Awards nominee
- Christie Enke (C), chemist
- Joe Fitzgibbon (US, C), politician
- Ketti Frings (attended C), author, playwright, and screenwriter
- Aaron Goldsmith (US, C), sportscaster
- Larry Groce (C), singer-songwriter and radio host
- Peter Horton (attended C), actor and movie director
- Kipp Keller, professional soccer player
- Egil Krogh (US, C), lawyer
- Arend Lijphart (C), political scientist
- David Lovegren (US, C), film producer
- Ngozi Mwanamwambwa (C), Zambian sprinter
- Joy Osmanski (C), actress
- Charles Remington (C), entomologist
- David Rowland (C), industrial designer
- Chris Shays (C), former US representative
- Dean Smith (attended C), pioneer pilot
