= Principia College =

Private liberal arts college in Elsah, Illinois, U.S.

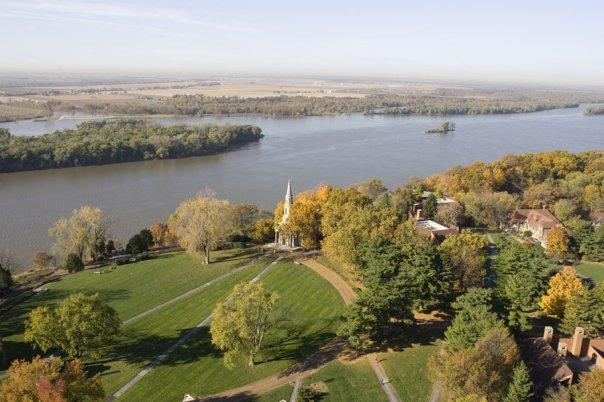
- Principia's campus sits on the bluffs overlooking the Mississippi River.
- Motto: As The Sowing, The Reaping
- Type: Private liberal arts college
- Established: 1912; 114 years ago
- Religious affiliation: Church of Christ, Scientist
- Endowment: $963.4 million (2025)
- President: Meggan Madden
- Administrative staff: 120
- Students: 348 (fall 2023)
- Location: Elsah, Illinois, United States; 38°56′56″N 90°20′56″W
- Campus: 2,600 acres (1,100 ha); Rural, 2,500 acres (10 km^{2})
- Mascot: Panther, Thunder Chicken (Rugby)
- Colors: Blue and Gold
- Website: principiacollege.edu

Principia College is a private liberal arts college in Elsah, Illinois. It was founded in 1912 by Mary Kimball Morgan with the purpose of "serving the Cause of Christian Science." Morgan wrote in her book Education at the Principia that, "Although the College is not affiliated with the Christian Science Church, the practice of Christian Science is the cornerstone of campus life." Principia no longer requires its students or their parents to be students of Christian Science or Christian Science Church members. Presently, its student body represents 26 countries and a variety of faith backgrounds.

Principia sits on bluffs overlooking the Mississippi River between Alton and Grafton in the Metro East region of Southern Illinois, thirty miles north of St. Louis. A portion of the school's 2,500-acre (1,000 ha) campus is a designated National Historic Landmark District, for its many buildings and design by architect Bernard Maybeck.

== History ==
Although Principia College was born out of The Principia, founded by Mary Kimball Morgan in 1898, the name Principia was not adopted until 1898. As Morgan's school grew, the founder of Christian Science, Mary Baker Eddy, approved The Principia's reference as a Christian Science school. Emerging from the Principia Lower, Middle, and Upper Schools founded between 1898 and 1906, Principia College was established with a purpose of "serving the Cause of Christian Science through appropriate channels open to it as an educational institution." The college, however, has no official affiliation with the Christian Science Church, and Christian Science is not taught as a subject, but its teachings form the basis of community life at Principia. The first Upper School class graduated in 1906 and it is from this class that a junior college was established, whose first alumni graduated in 1917. Principia College has been accredited by the Higher Learning Commission since 1923. The Junior College was formally recognized and accredited by the University of Missouri in 1916.

Architect Bernard Maybeck was commissioned to design a new college campus in Elsah, Illinois. By 1931, ground was broken on what would become his largest commission.

On the Principia College grounds is Eliestoun House, designed by Alexander Wadsworth Longfellow Jr. and completed in 1890. When Principia began moving to Elsah, guests stayed there, including Mary Kimball Morgan and Bernard Maybeck.

In 1934, Principia College graduated its first class as a full four-year institution. From February 28 to March 2, 1935, the college was officially moved to its present-day location in Elsah.

The Principia College campus was once considered as the site for the United States Air Force Academy though ultimately the Air Force chose a location in Colorado Springs, Colorado, instead.

On April 19, 1993, about 300 acres (120 ha) of the campus was designated a National Historic Landmark by the United States Department of the Interior. The year 1998 marked centennial celebrations by the school.

In the 21st century, the school's enrollment size has declined due to the dwindling number of Christian Scientists. As of 2024, the school began accepting students with no affiliation with Christian Science.

== Campus ==
=== Housing and student life facilities ===
There are ten student dormitories on campus: Anderson Hall, Rackham Court, Howard House, Sylvester House, Buck House, Brooks House, Ferguson House, Joe McNabb, Lowrey House, and Clara McNabb. The first six mentioned were designed by former University of California, Berkeley professor and AIA Gold Medal winner Bernard Maybeck in 1935, as was the campus' chapel. Maybeck attempted to use different architectural styles and building techniques for each of these dormitories and for the chapel. In an effort to ensure success with his designs and materials, he experimented with them through the creation of a small building known affectionately by Principians as the "Mistake House." In celebration of the 2018 Illinois Bicentennial, the Principia College Campus was selected as one of the Illinois 200 Great Places by the American Institute of Architects Illinois component (AIA Illinois).

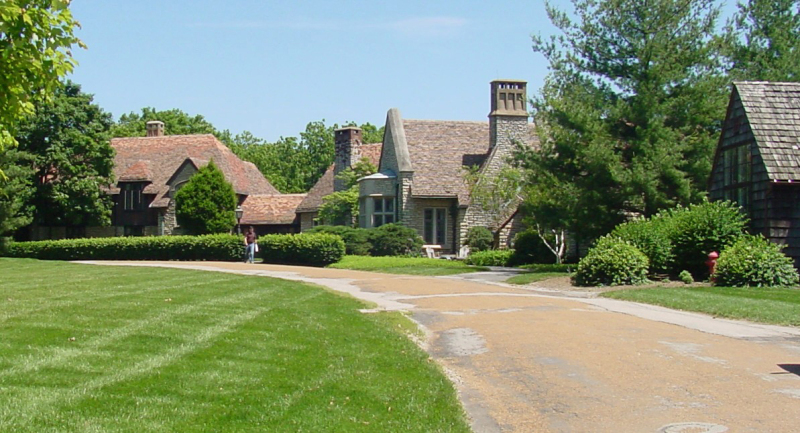
Buck House

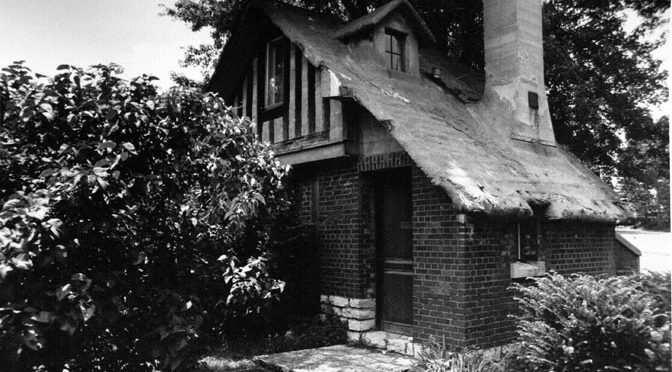
Mistake House

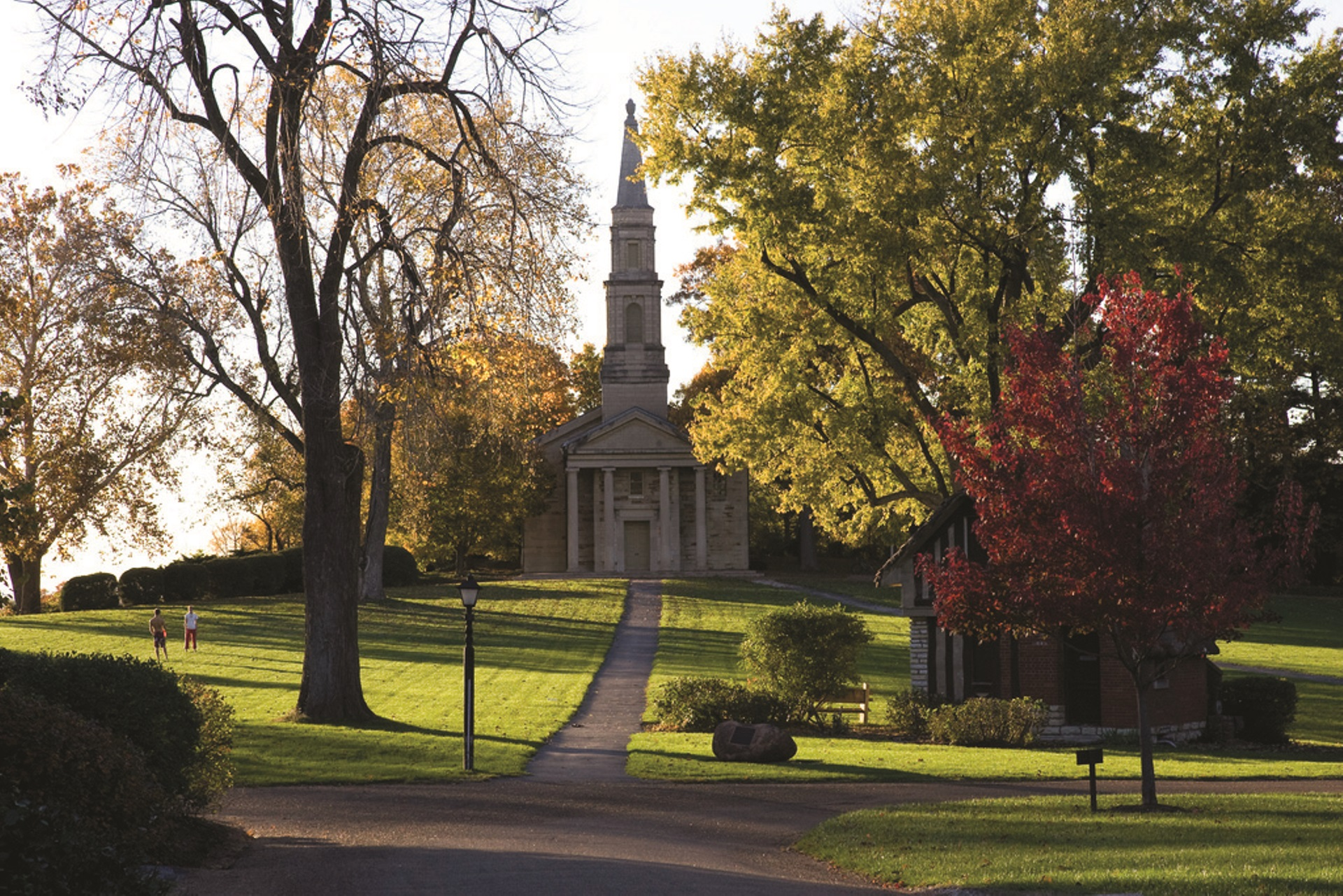
Principia College Chapel

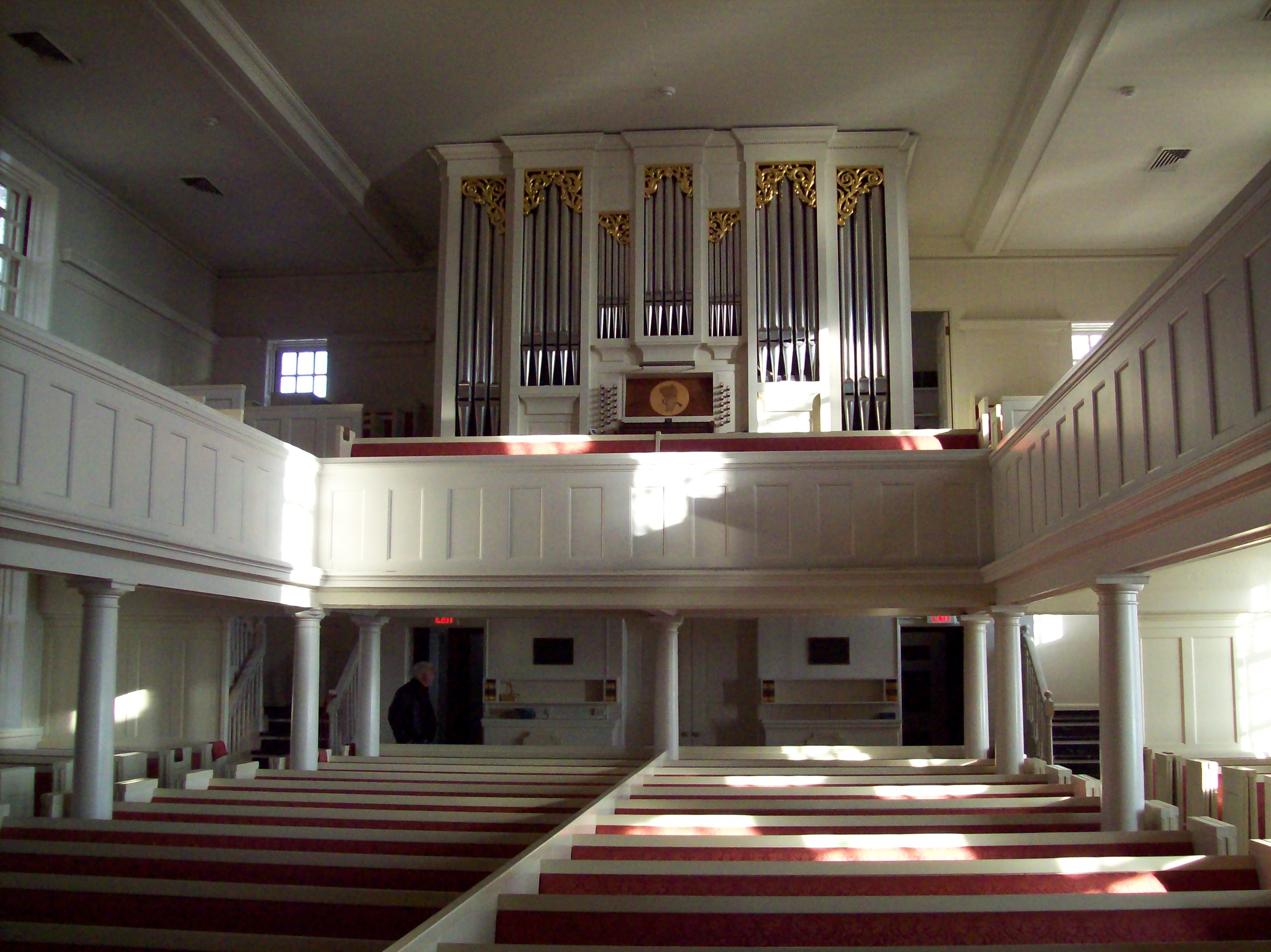
Interior of the chapel

== Organization and administration ==
Principia had an endowment of $696.2 million as of June 2020. The endowment size declined by more than $100 million in the decade prior to 2018.

== Academics ==
Principia College offers twenty-seven majors in the liberal arts and sciences. The academic majors are housed in one of five Academic Centers: Center for Narrative, Meaning & Media, Center for Business & Computer Science, Center for Civic & Global Engagement, Center for Sustainability, Ecology & Chemistry, and Center for the Arts. The college does not currently offer a graduate program. The most popular majors include mass communication, biology, sociology, anthropology, studio and fine art, and business administration.

Principia offers Study Abroad & Field Programs, International Student Programs, Conferences, and International Student Experiences. Recent Study Abroad programs have traveled to Finland, Malawi, Spain, Nepal, Greece, Italy & Malta, and Peru.

In their 2025 rankings, U.S. News & World Report ranked Principia tied for #66 (up from #83 in 2019 and #139 in 2014) among all National Liberal Arts Colleges, and #2 in the category of "Best Value Schools". For the 2026–2027 academic year, Principia College's annual tuition costs were $34,800, with additional costs of $15,000 for living expenses and fees. In 2024, the school had an acceptance rate above 45%.

== Student life ==
Principia College has a diverse student composition and amount of organizations given its size. 41% of its students are international. The college has 24 student clubs and organizations, among these Half the Sky, Friends of English, and Fire Brigade. The Public Affairs Conference at the college is one of oldest student-led conferences in America and has been held annually since 1939. The Principia College Speaker Series has featured former United States president Barack Obama, statesman and retired four-star general Colin Powell, former United States president George H. W. Bush, former United States president Jimmy Carter, author and poet Maya Angelou, David McCullough, Elie Wiesel, actor and director Robert Duvall, Val Kilmer, Coretta Scott King, and Margaret Thatcher. In addition to the Public Affairs Conference, Principia College holds an International Perspectives Conference with a focus on global issues such as human rights in Africa.

=== Technology ===
Of the technological programs present at Principia College, most prevalent and distinguished is its study in solar energy. The college has competed in solar car world events since 1995 and finished second in the North American Solar Challenge of 2008 and seventh in the World Solar Challenge of 2009.

=== Athletics ===
Principia athletics monogram

Principia College teams, named the Panthers, participate as a member of the National Collegiate Athletic Association's Division III in the St. Louis Intercollegiate Athletic Conference (SLIAC). The Principia Panther is the mascot of Principia College and has been since its change from the Indian in 1984. There are 14 varsity athletic teams at Principia College. Men's sports are baseball, basketball, cross country, soccer, tennis, track & field, and rugby; women's sports include basketball, cross country, soccer, softball, tennis, track & field and volleyball.

In 1983, the women's tennis team won the NCAA Division III national championship.

In 2013, the men's rugby team won the first ever Open Division USA Rugby 7s Collegiate National Championship, beating the University of Wisconsin-Stout 27–12 in the championship match.

In 2022, the men's rugby team completed an undefeated season by winning the Division II National Collegiate Rugby Championship XVs title, defeating Indiana University of Pennsylvania 47–16 in the championship match.

== Notable alumni ==
- Robert Bruegmann — architectural historian
- Chandler Burr — author
- Ron Charles (B.A. 1984) — Washington Post book critic
- Candy Crowley (attended) — CNN political correspondent
- Robert Duvall (B.A. 1953) — actor: Academy Award for Best Actor winner (1983, Tender Mercies)
- Emily Fridlund — author of History of Wolves
- Ketti Frings — author, writer: Pulitzer Prize for Drama winner (1958, Look Homeward, Angel)
- Aaron Goldsmith — MLB color commentator for the Seattle Mariners, commentator for Fox Sports 1 for college basketball
- Larry Groce — host of public radio's Mountain Stage
- Peter Horton (attended) — actor and movie director
- Mindy Jostyn (attended) — singer / songwriter
- Egil Krogh — part of U.S. President Richard Nixon's administration; convicted in the Watergate scandal
- Joanne Leedom-Ackerman (B.A. 1968) – novelist
- Arend Lijphart — political scientist
- David K. Lovegren — film producer
- Miye Matsukata — jewelry designer
- Terry Melcher — record producer and son of Doris Day
- Ngozi Mwanamwambwa — first woman to compete for Zambia at an Olympics
- Sara Nelson (B.A. 1995) — union leader
- Brad Newsham (B.A. 1972) — writer
- Haru M. Reischauer — author of Samurai and Silk
- James Rosebush (B.A. 1971) — former chief of staff to the First Lady under Nancy Reagan
- John H. Rousselot (B.A. 1949) — United States congressman from California (1961–1962, 1969–1982)
- David Rowland — industrial designer, created the 40/4 stacking chair
- Christopher Shays (B.A. 1968) — United States congressman from Connecticut (1987–2009)

== See also ==
- Principia College Historic District
- Principia Astronomical Observatory
