= Elsah, Illinois =

Elsah
- Village
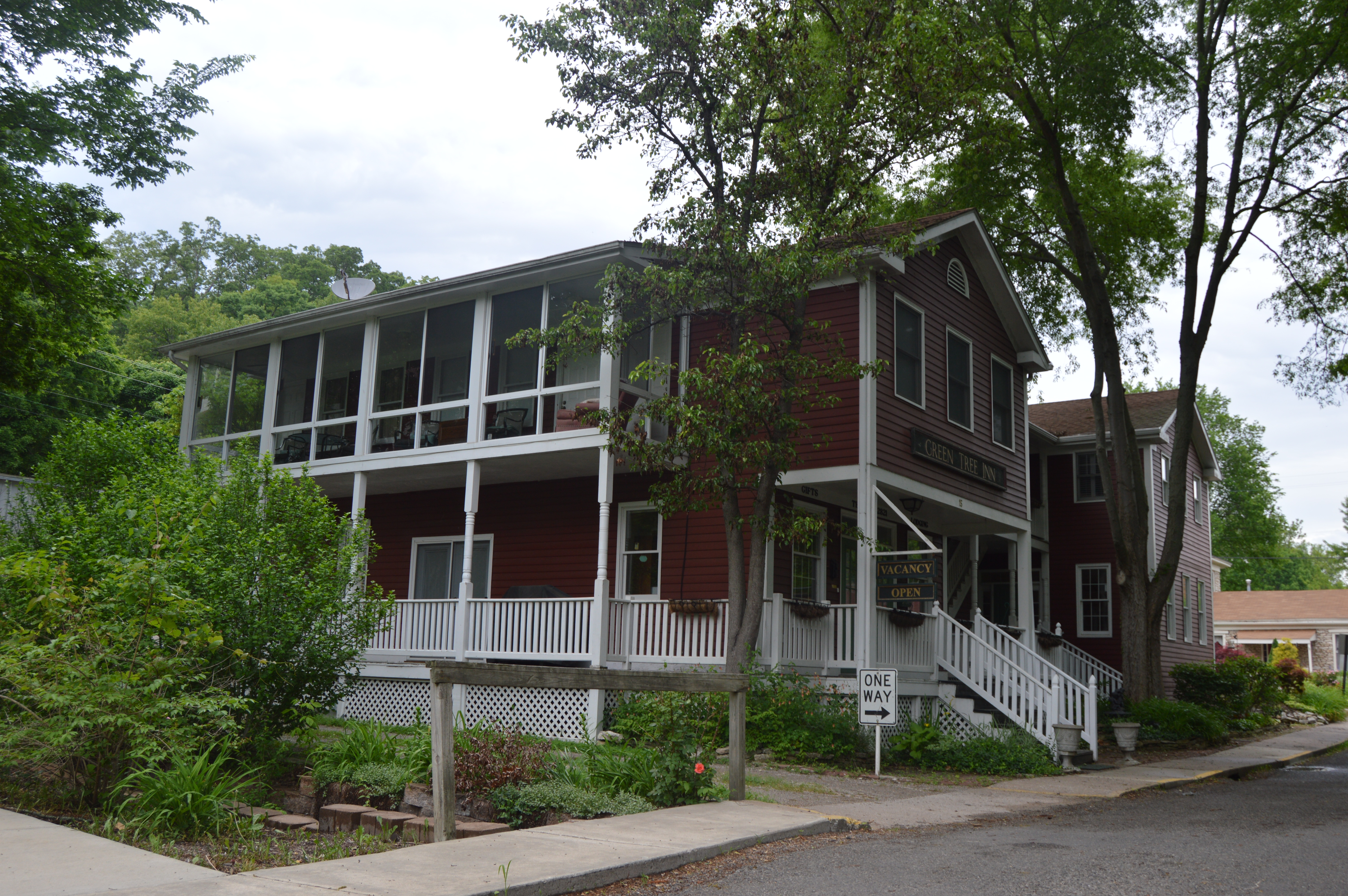
- Green Tree Inn of Elsah at Mill and Selma Streets, Elsah

- Location of Elsah in Jersey County, Illinois.
- Coordinates: 38°57′15″N 90°21′19″W
- Country: United States
- State: Illinois
- County: Jersey
- Township: Elsah

Government
  - Type: Mayor-Council

Area
  - Total: 1.09 sq mi (2.83 km^{2})
  - Land: 1.09 sq mi (2.83 km^{2})
  - Water: 0 sq mi (0.00 km^{2})
- Elevation: 489 ft (149 m)

Population (2020)
  - Total: 519
  - Density: 475.2/sq mi (183.47/km^{2})
- Time zone: UTC-6 (CST)
  - Summer (DST): UTC-5 (CDT)
- ZIP code: 62028
- Area code: 618
- FIPS code: 17-23776
- GNIS feature ID: 2398818
- Website: http://www.elsah.org/

Elsah is a village in Jersey County, Illinois. As of the 2020 census, the village had a total population of 519.

Elsah is a part of the Metro-East region and the St. Louis Metropolitan Statistical Area.

== History ==
James Semple, a local lawyer, prominent politician and United States Senator from Illinois, founded Elsah in 1853 and offered free lots to anyone who built houses with stone from his quarry. It is believed that he named the village of Elsah after Ailsa Craig, the last outcropping his family saw as they departed Scotland for the United States. By 1861, the village had grown to its current size, as geographic and economic limitations prevented further expansion.

Although Elsah has been described as the "New England of the Midwest," the village is not a New England prototype derived from 18th century colonial styles. Rather, the architecture found in Elsah demonstrates 19th century styles and fashions including Greek Revival, Gothic Revival, Mansard, Italianate, Saltbox, and Gambrel. Elsah prospered as the main shipping point for the agricultural goods produced by the farmers of Jersey County. The village's importance diminished with the coming of the railroad, later being revitalized when Principia College was established in the 1930s.

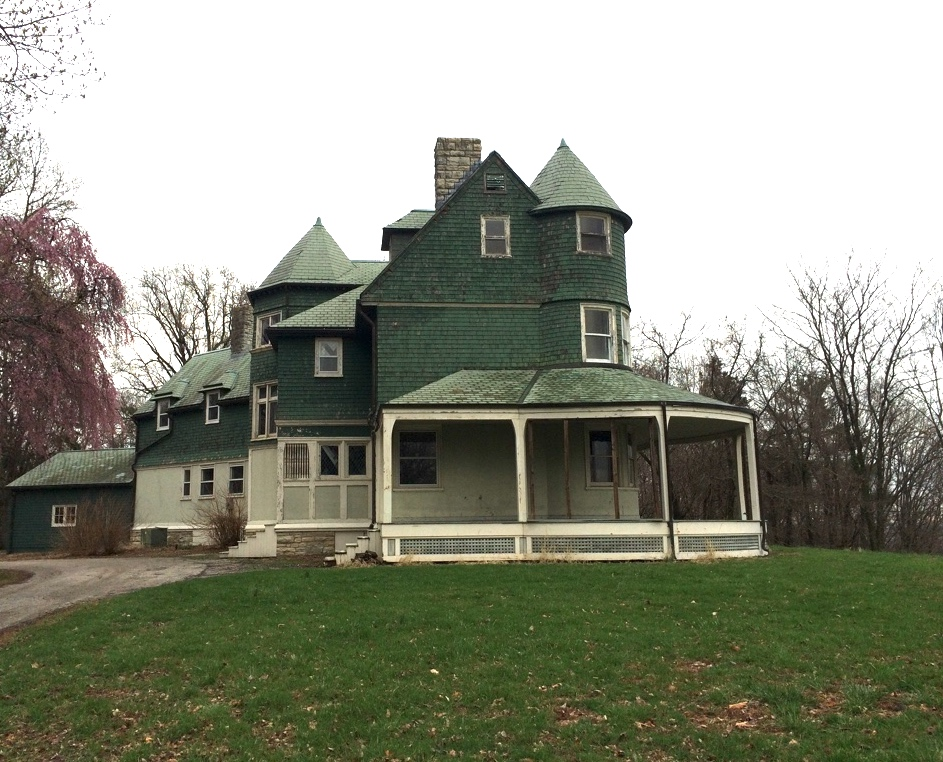
Eliestoun House was designed by Alexander Wadsworth Longfellow Jr. It was completed in 1890 and is on the Principia College campus. Photographed in 2014.

Eliestoun House was completed in 1890 by Alexander Wadsworth Longfellow Jr. The house is on the grounds of Principia College and named after "'Elliestoun Tower' on Castle Semple Loch" which is part of the Lands of Elliston in Scotland. Henry Turner and his wife Ada Ames had the house built. Ada is a descendant of James Semple.

Elsah remained mainly a quiet village until the opening of the Great River Road (Illinois Route 100) in 1964. Elsah is a community whose homes are privately owned. In 1973, the entire village was placed on the National Register of Historic Places.

The Great Flood of 1993 caused significant damage to many of the village's structures.

The historic commercial district on LaSalle Street, which extends three blocks inward from the river, consists mainly of stone buildings; all but one of its pre-1861 buildings, including all four of the village's historic taverns, still stand. The other two districts are both located on Mill Street and are primarily residential; the larger one is three blocks long and has an assortment of stone and brick houses, while the smaller section has a single block of Greek Revival homes.

Today, Elsah's proximity to bald eagle watching locations make it a popular destination during the fall and winter seasons. Elsah's location on the Sam Vadalabene Bike Trail also makes it a popular stop for bicyclists enjoying the Great River Road in any season.

== Geography ==
According to the 2021 census gazetteer files, Elsah has a total area of 1.09 square miles (2.82 km^{2}), all land.

The Meeting of the Great Rivers Scenic Byway passes through Elsah. The Elsah area was also one of the two finalists for the site of the Air Force Academy in 1954.

== Demographics ==
Historical population
Census	Pop.	Note	%±
1880	250		—
1890	271		8.4%
1900	220		−18.8%
1910	267		21.4%
1920	167		−37.5%
1930	137		−18.0%
1940	175		27.7%
1950	520		197.1%
1960	507		−2.5%
1970	928		83.0%
1980	990		6.7%
1990	851		−14.0%
2000	635		−25.4%
2010	673		6.0%
2020	519		−22.9%
Decennial US Census

As of the 2020 census there were 519 people, 64 households, and 39 families residing in the village. The population density was 475.27 inhabitants per square mile (183.50/km^{2}). There were 93 housing units at an average density of 85.16 per square mile (32.88/km^{2}). The racial makeup of the village was 78.81% White, 10.79% African American, 0.00% Native American, 2.70% Asian, 0.58% Pacific Islander, 0.00% from other races, and 7.13% from two or more races. Hispanic or Latino of any race were 5.59% of the population.

There were 64 households, out of which 10.9% had children under the age of 18 living with them, 60.94% were married couples living together, none had a female householder with no husband present, and 39.06% were non-families. 39.06% of all households were made up of individuals, and 23.44% had someone living alone who was 65 years of age or older. The average household size was 2.36 and the average family size was 1.83.

The village's age distribution consisted of 1.0% under the age of 18, 79.9% from 18 to 24, 6.6% from 25 to 44, 5.7% from 45 to 64, and 6.8% who were 65 years of age or older. The median age was 20.7 years. For every 100 females, there were 119.7 males. For every 100 females age 18 and over, there were 117.6 males.

The median income for a household in the village was $97,500, and the median income for a family was $123,125. Males had a median income of $5,104 versus $4,141 for females. The per capita income for the village was $13,499. About 0.0% of families and 6.3% of the population were below the poverty line, including 0.0% of those under age 18 and 6.3% of those age 65 or over.

== Education ==
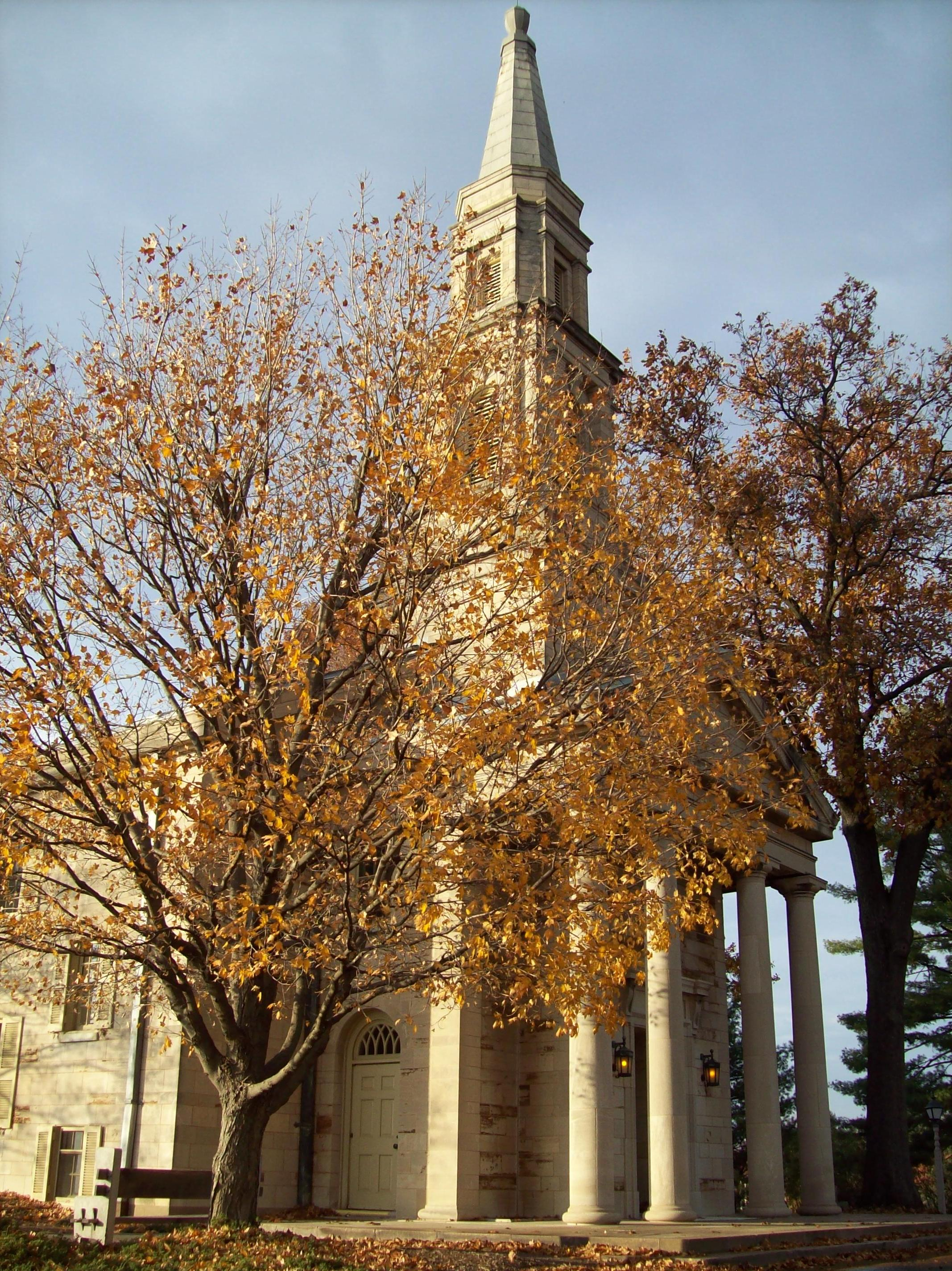
Principia College Chapel

The school district is Jersey Community Unit School District 100.

Elsah includes Principia College, a four-year liberal-arts private college for Christian Scientists. The campus area, known as the Principia College Historic District, was declared a National Historic Landmark in 1993, and was placed on the National Register of Historic Places that same year.

== Notable people ==
- Robert Duvall, Academy Award-winning actor, is an alumnus of Principia College in Elsah
- Herbert G. Giberson, Illinois state senator and businessman
- James Semple, United States Senator from Illinois, diplomat of New Granada, and founder of Elsah

== See also ==
- Elsah Historic District
- Principia Astronomical Observatory
