= List of Italian designers =

Currently available on Wikipedia are the following Italian designers

== A ==
- Franco Albini
- Giorgio Armani
- Sergio Asti
- Gae Aulenti

== B ==
- Mario Bellini
- Claudio Bellini
- Harry Bertoia
- Cini Boeri
- Stefano Boeri
- Osvaldo Borsani
- Andrea Branzi

== C ==
- Robby Cantarutti
- Clino Trini Castelli
- Achille Castiglioni
- Livio Castiglioni
- Pier Giacomo Castiglioni
- Roberto Cavalli
- Aldo Cibic
- Antonio Citterio
- Joe Colombo

== D ==
- Dolce and Gabbana
- Mario Dal Fabbro
- Michele De Lucchi

== F ==
- Battista Farina
- Fendi
- Salvatore Ferragamo
- Anna Castelli Ferrieri
- Andrea Fogli
- Gianfranco Frattini

== G ==
- Eugenio Gerli
- Dante Giacosa
- Roberto Giolito
- Giorgetto Giugiaro
- Gucci

== H ==
- Franca Helg

== I ==
- Giancarlo Iliprandi

== L ==
- Piero Lissoni

== M ==
- Vico Magistretti
- Angelo Mangiarotti
- Enzo Mari
- Paolo Martin
- Stefano Marzano
- Alberto Meda
- Alessandro Mendini
- Bruno Munari
- Missoni
- Moschino

== N ==
- Paola Navone
- Emanuele Nicosia
- Marcello Nizzoli
- Vito Noto
- Fabio Novembre

== P ==
- Cesare Paolini
- Gaetano Pesce
- Roberto Pezzetta
- Marco Piva
- Gio Ponti
- Mario Prada
- Emilio Pucci

== R ==
- Lorenzo Ramaciotti
- Willy Rizzo
- Ernesto Nathan Rogers
- Aldo Rossi

== S ==
- Bruno Sacco
- Afra and Tobia Scarpa
- Mara Servetto
- Walter de Silva
- Ettore Sottsass

== T ==
- Fabio Taglioni
- Massimo Tamburini
- Marco Tencone
- Matteo Thun

== V ==
- Lella Vignelli
- Massimo Vignelli
- Gianni Versace

== Z ==
- Ugo Zagato
- Marco Zanuso
- Ermenegildo Zegna
