= Wildhagen =

Wildhagen is a surname. Notable people with the surname include:

- Andreas Wildhagen (born 1988), Norwegian jazz drummer
- Else Wildhagen (1863–1944), German writer
- Fredrik Wildhagen (1939–1992), Norwegian art historian
- Georg Wildhagen (1920–1990), German screenwriter and film director
- Henry Wildhagen (1856–1920), German-born American architect
