= Denis Santachiara =

Italian designer

- Born: Campagnola Emilia
- Occupation: Car designer, curator, designer
- Website: denisantachiara.it

Denis Santachiara (born 1950) is an Italian artist and designer.

== Biography ==
Santichiara was born 4 May 1950 in Campagnola Emilia. He is an autodidact who worked as a car stylist for De Tomaso and Maserati early in his career.

His work has been exhibited at the Centre Pompidou, Triennale di Milano, Denver Art Museum, Indianapolis Museum of Art, and is held in collections including the Museum or Modern Art and Vitra Design Museum.

He has taught at the Istituto Superiore per le Industrie Artistiche (ISIA) in Florence, Scuola Politecnica di Design, Nuova Accademia di Belle Arti, and the Accademia di Brera in Milan (from which he also received an honorary degree in 2022).

He won a Good Design Award from the Chicago Athenaeum Museum of Architecture and Design in 1999, and in 2010, the Pyramid of Excellence, an award from the Italian Academy of Art, Fashion Design. He was also part of Ezio Manzini's team that won the 1987 Compasso d'Oro award for La materia dell'invenzione, a book the ADI jury described as "a valuable operational document capable of offering designers [...] advances in technical-scientific processes [...] bringing about the conjunction of technical science and art." In 2020, he was the chairman of the jury for the XXVI Compasso d’Oro award.

== Gallery ==
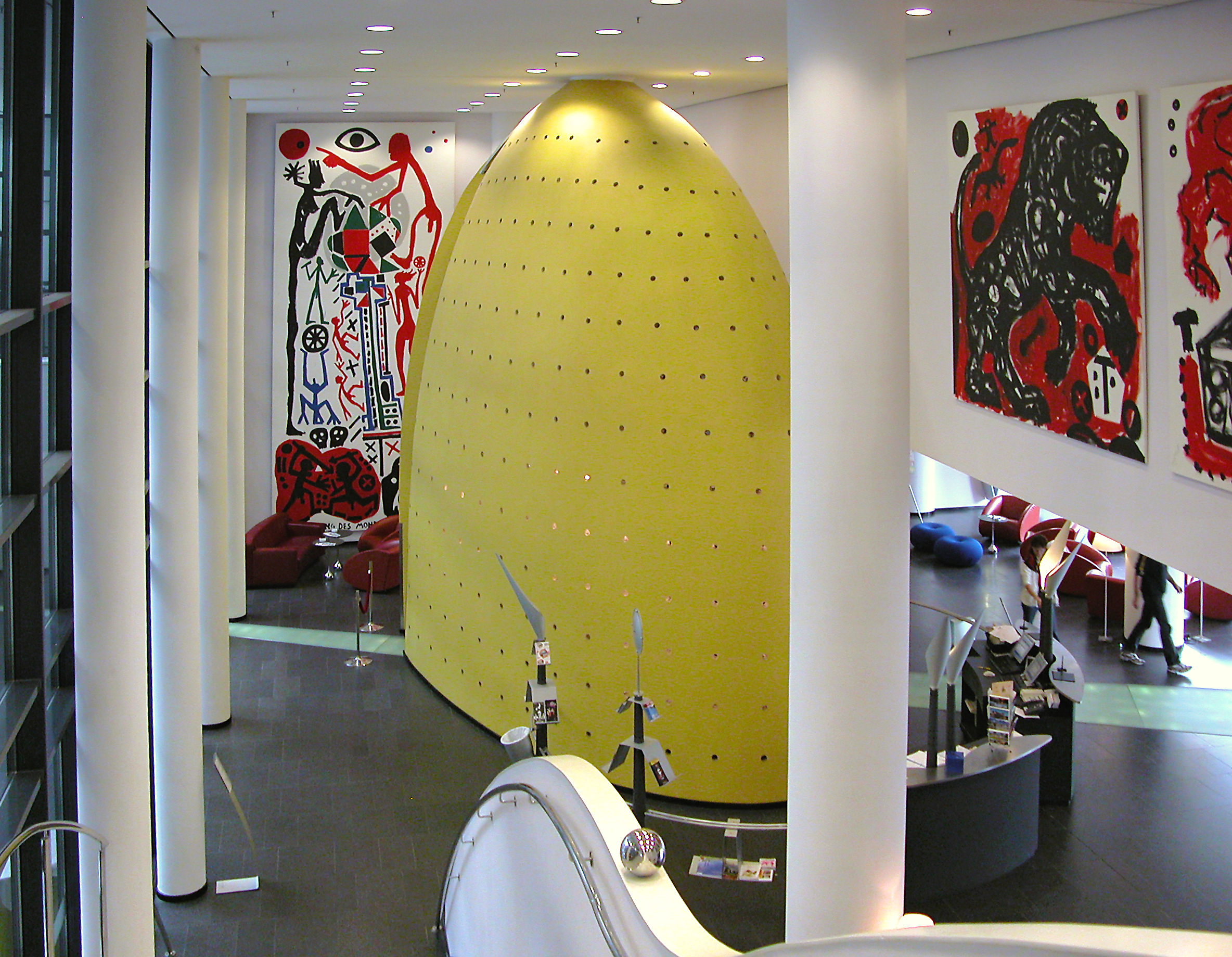
20061031050DR Dresden Art'otel Penck-Hotel
