= Scuola Politecnica di Design =

Design school in Milan, Italy

Coordinates: 45.442°N 9.164°E

SPD
- Scuola Politecnica di Design
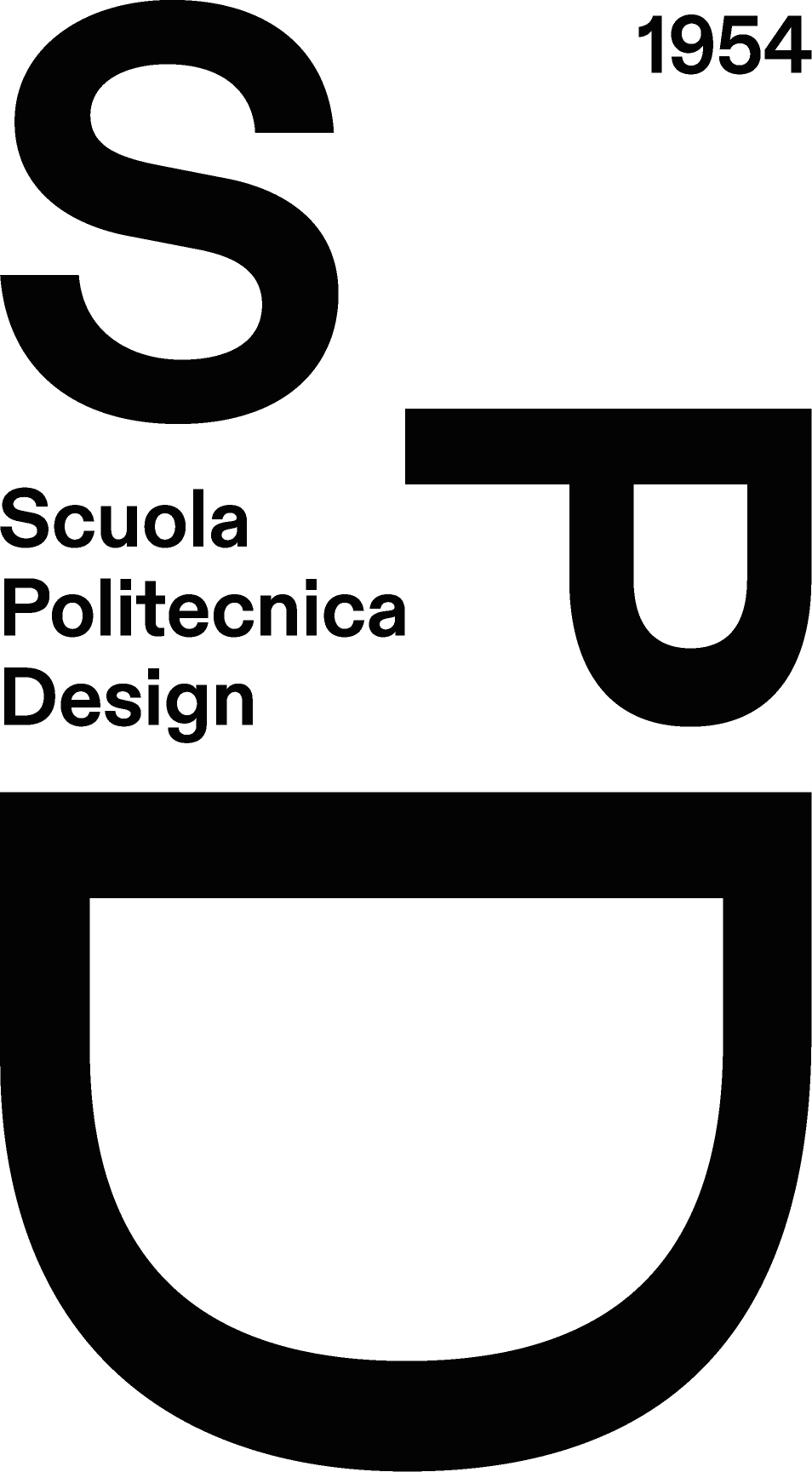
- Type: Private Postgraduate Polytechnic School
- Established: 1954
- Students: 200
- Postgraduates: Transportation and Car Design, Industrial Design, Interior Design, Food Design and Innovation, Visual Design, Web and Digital Design, Event and Exhibition Design
- Location: Milan, ITA
- Website: www.scuoladesign.com

The Scuola Politecnica di Design (SPD) is a Milan-based postgraduate training institution focused on project disciplines in the areas of design and visual communication. The postgrad offering of SPD includes yearly masters in industrial design, interior design, transportation and car design, visual design, "Web Design and Multimedia". Teaching is organized in intensive workshops, labs, theoretical study, seminars and activities in the field; courses end with a professional internship.

== Organizations and associations ==
The Scuola Politecnica di Design is a member of such Italian design associations, like ADI Associazione Disegno Industriale, AIAP (Associazione Italiana Progettisti Grafici), and ASFOR (Associazione Italiana per la Formazione Manageriale). SPD is also member of the Cumulus academic network.

== Certifications ==
In 2009 SPD was certified as UNI EN ISO 9001:2008 compliant. The Scuola Politecnica di Design is officially acknowledged as learning institution by the regional government of Lombardy.

== Exhibitions and awards ==
Venice Biennale exhibition in 1986; Carrousel du Louvre and the Centre Georges Pompidou in Paris. Gold medal at the Tenth Milan Triennal Exhibition; Compasso d'Oro assigned by the Associazione per il Disegno Industriale (Industrial Design Association, ADI) in 1994; Smau Industrial Design Award twice.
