= Claudio Bellini =

Italian architect and designer

Claudio Francesco Bellini
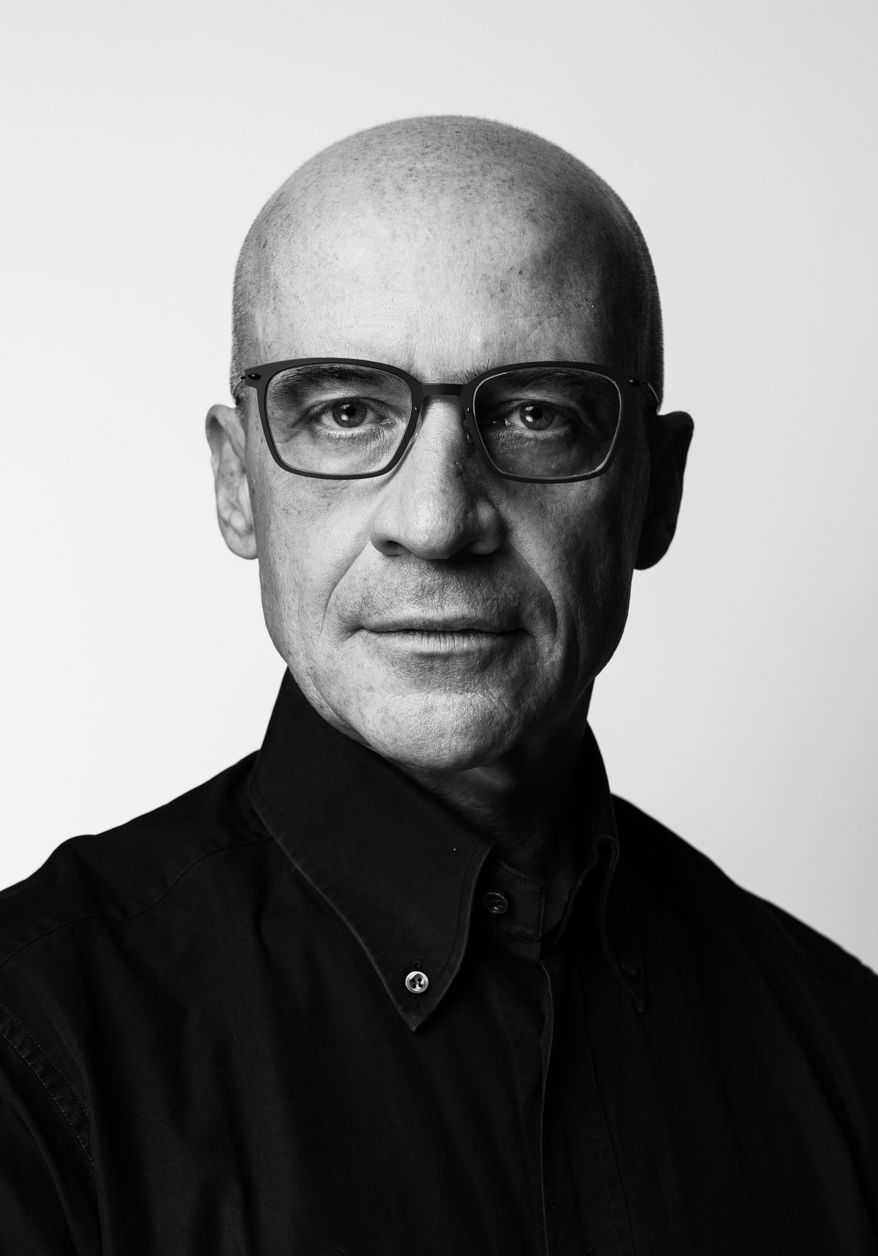
- Born: 3 May 1963 (age 63)
- Occupations: Architect & furniture designer
- Spouse: Lara Bellini

Claudio Bellini (born 3 May 1963) is an Italian-born architect and designer based in Milan. He runs an architecture and design practice, CLAUDIO BELLINI Studio. Bellini, a well-known speaker who has spent many years lecturing at universities, serves as the creative director for a number of major multinational businesses.

== Biography ==
Born and raised in Milan, Bellini's strong fascination with creativity dates back to his early childhood years, growing up with his father, Mario Bellini, who is a pioneer in contemporary design. In 1990, Claudio Bellini graduated from the Politecnico di Milano in Architecture and Industrial Design. After his studies, from 1990 to 1996, he collaborated with his father in Mario Bellini Associates where he took part in research projects in the fields of industrial, architectural and furniture design.

In 1996 Claudio Bellini founded his multidisciplinary design studio, consolidating important collaborations with leading companies such as Artemide, Flou, Poltrona Frau, Vitra, Driade, Frezza and Olivari.

Professor in Furniture Design at the Genoa University from 2004 to 2008, he has held lectures and conferences all over the world.

As a trendsetter in various design fields, he was honored with numerous international design awards, including the Red Dot and iF product design award. He has been also selected for the Compasso d'Oro).

== CLAUDIO BELLINI Studio ==
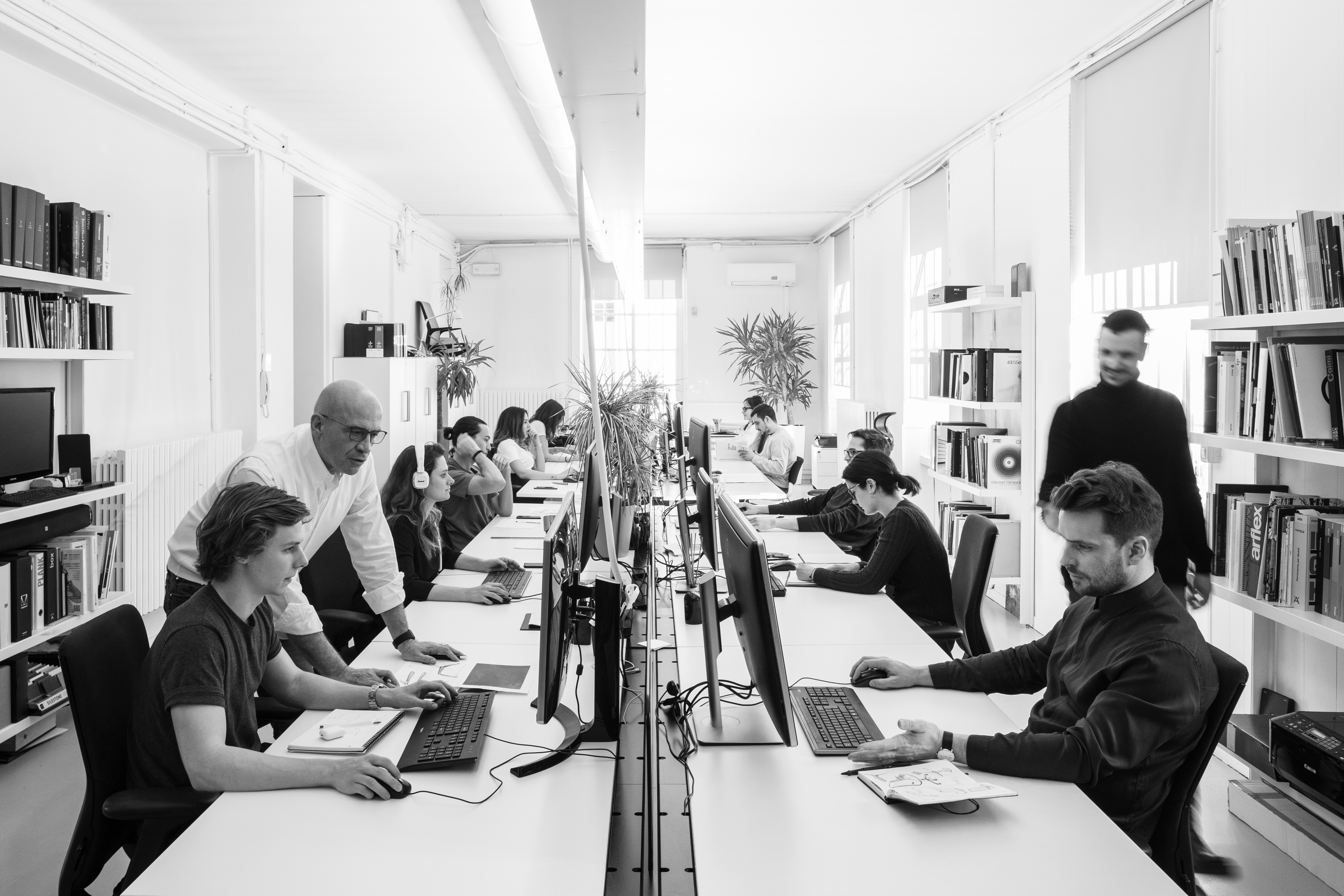
CLAUDIO BELLINI Studio based in Milan

In 1996 Claudio Bellini founded Atelier Bellini, later renamed Claudio Bellini design+design and recently rebranded into CLAUDIO BELLINI Studio: a multidisciplinary design studio shaped by a deep understanding of the creative process.

In 1998, his revolutionary office furniture system, TW Collection for Frezza, introduced a completely new vision to the contemporary workplace. From then on, his research in this field has largely contributed to anticipating behaviors and trends in the evolution of the office environment in recent decades.

Creative director, over the years, for several international companies such as Natuzzi Italia and Fursys Group, since 2003, he has contributed significantly with his creative vision to transform Barazzoni into one of the most important Italian kitchenware companies.

Claudio Bellini's innovative approach contributed to the creation of original projects with companies including Bernhardt Design, Pedrali, Walter Knoll, RH, Riva1920 and Dedon.

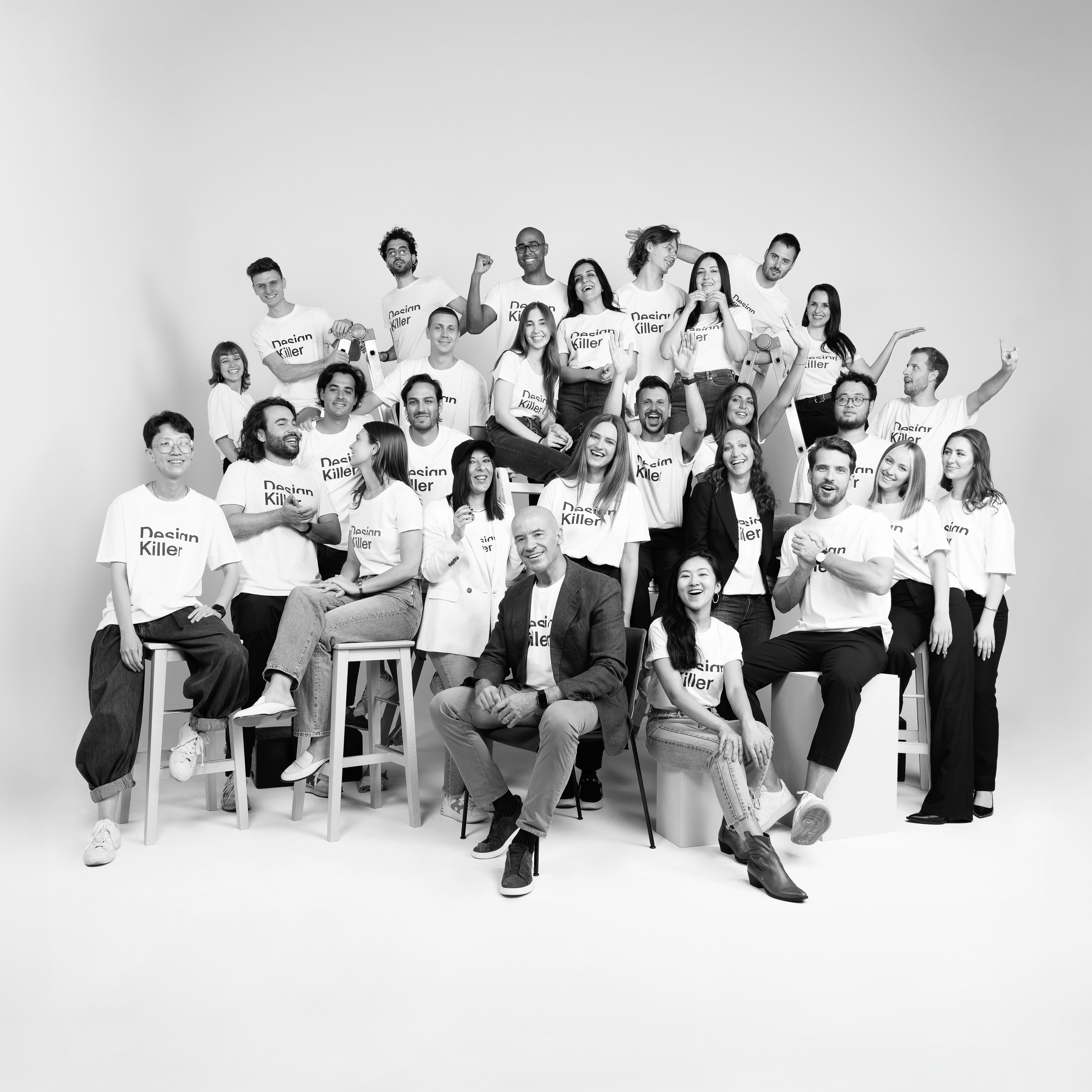
CLAUDIO BELLINI Design Group in 2023 - photo by Felipe Cordeiro

Claudio Bellini's global vision and his understanding of different cultural and markets, supported by a multinational team, have expanded the firm into the CLAUDIO BELLINI Design Group. The firm has worked with clients from the Far East to the United States, and recognized as a European design studio with much influence.

== Achievements & Awards ==
Awards	Year	Project	Client
ADI Design Index Award	2005	B.O.S	Frezza Spa, Italy
ADI Design Index Award	2003	Motus	iGuzzini, Italy
ADI Design Index Award	2001	Y Chair	Vitra, Germany
ADI Design Index Award	2000	Bella	Castaldi Illuminazione, Italy
ADI Design Index Award	1998	TWork Collection	Frezza Spa, Italy
Archiproducts Design Awards	2023	Sospiro Bed	Riva 1920, Italy
Archiproducts Design Awards	2017	Axy	MDF Italia, Italy
Best of Neocon	2024	Blush	OFS, USA
Best of Neocon	2024	Sephen	SitOnIt Seating, USA
Best of Neocon	2024	Clova	SitOnIt Seating, USA
Best of Neocon	2022	Ravel	Bernhardt Design, USA
Best of Neocon	2012	VIA	Steelcase, Italy
Best of Neocon	2010	DR	Frezza Spa, Italy
Best of Neocon	1998	TWork Collection	Frezza Spa, Italy
BigSEE Design Award	2020	Equal	VitrA Bathrooms, Turkey
BigSEE Design Award	2020	HUP	Sunon Furniture, China
Design Center Stuttgart	2006	Headline	Vitra, UK
Design Preis Schweiz	2008	My Lady Utensils	Barazzoni, Italy
Design Preis Schweiz	2003	My Lady	Barazzoni, Italy
German Design Award	2020	UD	Sunon, China
German Design Award	2020	HUP	Sunon, China
German Design Award	2002	Conversa	BN Office Solution
IF Design Award	2023	Winden	Sidiz, South Korea
IF Design Award	2022	Yoco	Kano, China
IF Design Award	2021	Foresty	Fursys, South Korea
IF Design Award	2020	Equal	VitrA Bathrooms, Turkey
IF Design Award	2020	Querencia	Alloso, South Korea
IF Design Award	2019	Playworks	Sidiz, South Korea
IF Design Award	2017	Fungus	Sidiz, South Korea
IF Design Award	2012	My White	Saturn Bath, South Korea
IF Design Award	2011	Silicon Pro Ceramico	Barazzoni, Italy
IF Design Award	2012	Ega	Sidiz, South Korea
IF Design Award	2010	1580 table	Thonet, Germany
IF Design Award	2010	580 chair	Thonet, Germany
IF Design Award	2008	Moon	Barazzoni, Italy
IF Design Award	2006	Butterfly	Barazzoni, Italy
IF Design Award	2003	Motus	iGuzzini, Italy
Red Dot Design Award	2024	Tekno R	Higold, China
Red Dot Design Award	2022	Winden	Sidiz, South Korea
Red Dot Design Award	2022	Olly	Barazzoni, Italy
Red Dot Design Award	2021	Yoco	Kano, China
Red Dot Design Award	2019	Playworks	Sidiz, South Korea
Red Dot Design Award	2015	Fly	HengFeng, China
Red Dot Design Award	2013	Liz Wood	Walter Knoll, Germany
Red Dot Design Award	2013	Liz	Walter Knoll, Germany
Red Dot Design Award	2013	Button (CBS)	Sidiz, South Korea
Red Dot Design Award	2012	EGA	Sidiz, South Korea
Red Dot Design Award	2008	Gio	Walter Knoll, Germany
Red Dot Design Award	2008	Moon	Barazzoni, Italy
Red Dot Design Award	2003	My Lady	Barazzoni, Italy
Red Dot Design Award	2001	Y Chair	Vitra, Switzerland
Red Dot Design Award	2000	Iti	Artemide, Italy
