= Roberto Pezzetta =

Italian artist and industrial designer (born 1946)

Roberto Pezzetta (born 1946, Treviso) is an Italian artist and industrial designer.

== Career ==
Pezzetta began his product design career in 1969 at Zoppas Elettrodomestici, helping to establish its industrial design team. In the late 1970s, after a brief role as chief of design at Nordica, he returned to Zanussi, where he led the Industrial Design Center from 1982. After Zanussi merged with Electrolux in 1984, the Zanussi center became one of Electrolux’s three global design hubs.

Pezzetta became creative director for Electrolux in 2002, holding the title of Vice President of Design. He retired in 2005 and has since served as an industrial design consultant. In 2016, he was awarded the Compasso d'Oro Career Award.

In 2003, the exhibition "La Fabbrica e...i Sogni" (The Factory and...the Dreams) was dedicated to his work in Oderzo, showcasing his designs for Zanussi Electrolux and other companies.

Pezzetta’s design philosophy emphasizes a multidisciplinary approach, incorporating elements of art, engineering, psychology, sociology, and communication.

== Prizes ==
- Compasso d'Oro 1981 at Industrial Design Zanussi.
- Compasso d'Oro alla Carriera 2016.
- Product prize at the Compasso d'Oro del 1987, 1989, 1991, 2008.
- Three honor designations at the Compasso d'Oro 1998, 2001, 2004.
- Two gold medals at the Biennali del Design di Lubiana BIO 12, BIO19.
- Salone delle Arti Domestiche - Paris 1990.
- Goed Industrieel Ontwerp Netherlands 1987, 1991, 1999, 2001.
- Design Prestige in Brno 1997.
- Design Prize MCMXCVIII. XVI Fiera Internazionale di L'Avana, Cuba 1998.
- "Good Design" Awards at the Chicago Athenaeum 1999, 2000, 2001, 2002, 2003, 2004, 2009.
- KBD Award (UK) 2003.
- IF product design award 2005.
- Red Dot design award 2005.

== Expositions ==
=== 1980s ===
- 1987 Compasso D'Oro Exhibition Milan (I)
- 1987 Compasso D'Oro Exhibition Varsaw, Gliwice, Cracovia, Poznan, Stettino (Poland)
- 1988 Design in Europa Stuttgart (D)
- 1988 Compasso D'Oro Exhibition Helsinki (SF)
- 1988 Image & Design Bolzano (I)
- 1988 Bio 12 Biennial of Industrial Design Ljubljana (SLO)
- 1989 Novyj Dom Italia Moscow (URSS)
- 1989 Design Italiano Budapest (H)
- 1989 Compasso D'Oro Exhibition - World Design Expo Nagoja (Jap)
- 1989 Compasso D'Oro Exhibition New York, Orlando, Atlanta, (US)
- 1989 DESIGN REVIEW Design Museum London (GB)

=== 1990s ===
- 1990 Civilta' Delle Macchine Turin (I)
- 1992 Design Future Philosophy Singapore
- 1992 Straordinario Fortezza da basso Florence (I)
- 1992 Organic Design Design Museum London (GB)
- 1992 Bio 13 Biennial of Industrial Design Ljubljana (SLO)
- 1993 Design Review Design Museum London (GB)
- 1994 Bio 14 Biennial of Industrial Design Ljubljana (SLO)
- 1994 Abitare Il Tempo Verona (I)
- 1995 Abitare Il Tempo Verona (I)
- 1996 Design Im Wandel Bremen (D)
- 1996 Bio 15 Biennial of Industrial Design Ljubljana (SLO)
- 1996 Absolut Design Milan (I)
- 1996 Moda Lisboa Lisboa (Portugal)
- 1996 Il Design Ecosensibile International Design Forum Singapore
- 1997 Expo L'Ocio Madrid (E)
- 1997 Vision Brno (CZ)
- 1997 21° Century Home Exhibition Tallinn (Estonia)
- 1997 Thessaloniki Exhibition (Greece)
- 1997 Your Home Vilnius (Lituania)
- 1998 Sinn & Form Berlin (D)
- 1998 Bio 16 Biennial of Industrial Design Ljubljana (SLO)
- 1998 Diseño Italiano Madrid (E)
- 1998 Biennale Internationale du Design de Saint Etienne (F)
- 1999 Milano Capitale del Design: Il Paesaggio Domestico Milan (I)
- 1999 L'arte del Design Italiano Praha (CZ)
- 1999 Roberto Pezzetta Forum for Form Stockholm (S)
- 1999 Chef Design Milan (I)
- 1999 Designing in the Digital Age V&A Museum London (GB)
- 1999 The Shape of Colour "Red" Glasgow (GB)

=== 2000s ===
- 2000 Good Design Exhibition The Chicago Athenaeum (US)
- 2000 Abitare Il Tempo: Cucina come Verona (I)
- 2000 Les Bons Genies de la Vie Domestique Center Pompidou Paris (F)
- 2001 Good Design Exhibition The Chicago Athenaeum (US)
- 2001/2002 Italian Design on Tour Zurich, Milan, New York, Venice, London, Valencia, Coutrai
- 2002 Good Design Exhibition The Chicago Athenaeum (US)
- 2002 Softdesign Venice (I)
- 2003 Steel & Style Salone del Mobile Milan (I)
- 2003 Good Design Exhibition The Chicago Athenaeum (US)
- 2003 Zoomorphic V&A Museum London (GB)
- 2003 La Fabbrica E…i Sogni/ Roberto Pezzetta Industrial Designer Oderzo (I)
- 2004 Design e Nuovi Materiali, Materiali Catalizzatori Per PER L'Innovazione di Prodotto Recanati (I)
- 2005 Sintesi, Guilio Natta e le Materie Plastiche Museo Nazionale della Scienza e della Tecnologia Milan (I)
- 2005 Food Design Macef Milan (I)
- 2005 Simposio Internacional de Diseño Industrial Monterrey (Mexico)
- 2005 IUAV Design Workshop Design Week A Treviso Treviso (I)
- 2005 100 Volti per 100 Progetti Abitare Il Tempo Verona (I)
- 2005 Architetture D'Interni Abitare Il Tempo Verona (I)
- 2008 Eurocucina Salone del Mobile Milan (I)
- 2009 Serie Fuori Serie La Triennale di Milano Design Museum Milan (I)

=== 2010s ===
- 2010 Eurocucina Salone del Mobile Milan (I)
- 2012 Abitare Il Tempo Verona (I)
- 2015- 2016 Cucine & Ultracorpi Triennale Design Museum Milan (I)

=== 2020s ===
- 2022 Eurocucina Salone del Mobile-Design in the Kitchen Milan (I)
- 2022 Cleto Munari- Ossessione per la bellezza Treviso (I)

== Bibliography ==
- Albera, G & Monti, N Italian Modern: A Design Heritage (1989) Ed. Rizzoli International Publications, Inc.
- Ambasz, E The International Design Yearbook 1986/87 (1986) Ed. Thames and Hudson
- Auricchio, V Design in Cucina (2012) Ed. Ottagono Giunti
- Blanca, O N, Niesewand, N & Haines, C The International Design Yearbook 1989/90 (1989) Ed. Thames and Hudson
- Bosoni, G Italy Contemporary Domestic Landscape 1946-2000 (2002) Ed. Skira Editore S.P.A.
- Casotti, A Design The Italian Way (2001) Ed. Editoriale Modo
- Catterall, C Food Design and Culture (1999) Ed. Laurence King Publisher
- Fiell, C J, Field, P M Designing the 21st Century (2001) Ed. Taschen GmbH
- Giacobone, T F, Guide P, Pansera A Dalla Casa Elettrica Alla Casa Elettronica (1989) Ed. Electa
- Guidot, R & Jousset ML Le Bons Genies de la Vie Domestique (2000) Ed. Editios du Centre Pompidou
- King, L The International Design Yearbook 1998 (1998) Ed. Laurence King Publishing
- Langone, J How Things Work: Everyday Technology Explained (2006) Ed. The National Geographic Society
- McDermott, C Twentieth Century Design (1998) Design Museum Ed. Carlton Books Limited
- Mello, P Design Contemporaneo (2008) Ed. Electa
- Mending, A The International Design Yearbook 1996 (1996) Ed. Laurence King Publishing
- Niesewand, N Contemporary Details (1992) Ed. Mitchell Beazley Publishers
- Pansera, A Dizionario Del Design Italiano (2001) Ed. Cantini Editore
- Pansera, A Storia Del Disegno Industriale Italiano (1993) Ed. Laterza
- Pixis, Christian, Abendroth, Ute World Design (1999) Ed. Chronicle Books
- Putman, A The International Design Yearbook 1992 (1992) Ed. Thames and Hudson
- Scevola, A Prodotto Industriale Italiano Contemporaneo (1999) Ed. Edizioni L’Archinvolto
- Sparke, P Italian Design (1988) Ed. Thames and Hudson
- Sudjic D, Law, J The International Design Yearbook 1987/88 (1987) Ed. Thames and Hudson
- Woodham, J A Dictionary of Modern Design (2016) Ed. Oxford University Press
