= Compasso d'Oro =

Italian design award established 1954

- Awarded for: Industrial design excellence
- Sponsored by: Associazione per il Disegno Industriale
- Location: ADI Design Museum (Milan)
- Country: Italy
- Presented by: Associazione per il Disegno Industriale
- Established: 1954
- Website: adidesignmuseum.org

The Compasso d'Oro (Italian pronunciation: [komˈpasso ˈdɔːro]; 'Golden Compass') is an industrial design award which originated in Italy in 1954. Initially sponsored by Milanese department store La Rinascente, the award has been organised and managed by the Associazione per il Disegno Industriale (ADI) since 1964. The Compasso d'Oro is the first and among the most recognized and respected design awards. It aims to acknowledge and promote quality in industrial design in Italy and internationally, and has been called both the "Nobel" and the "Oscar" of design.

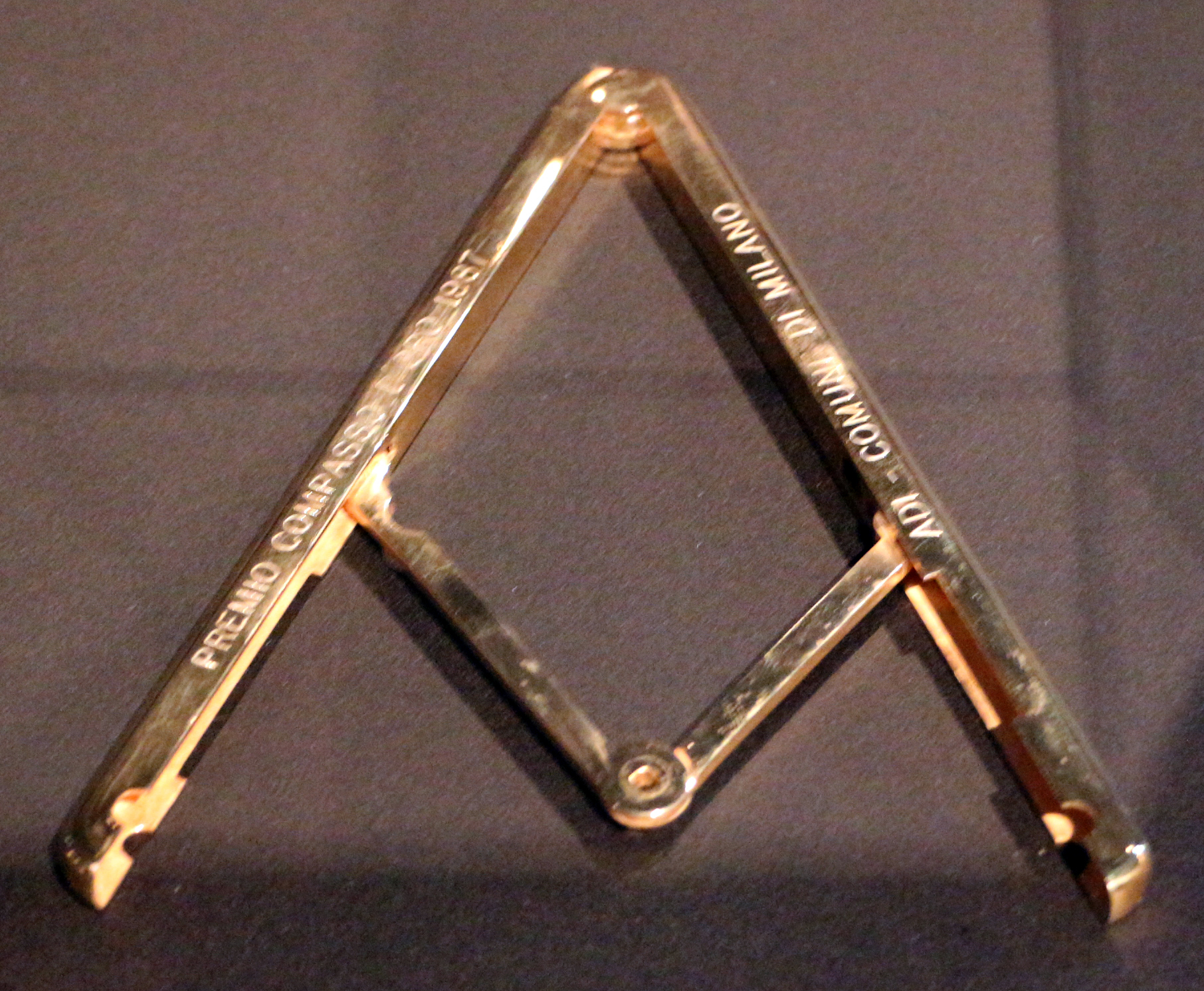
Compasso d'Oro award trophy

== History ==
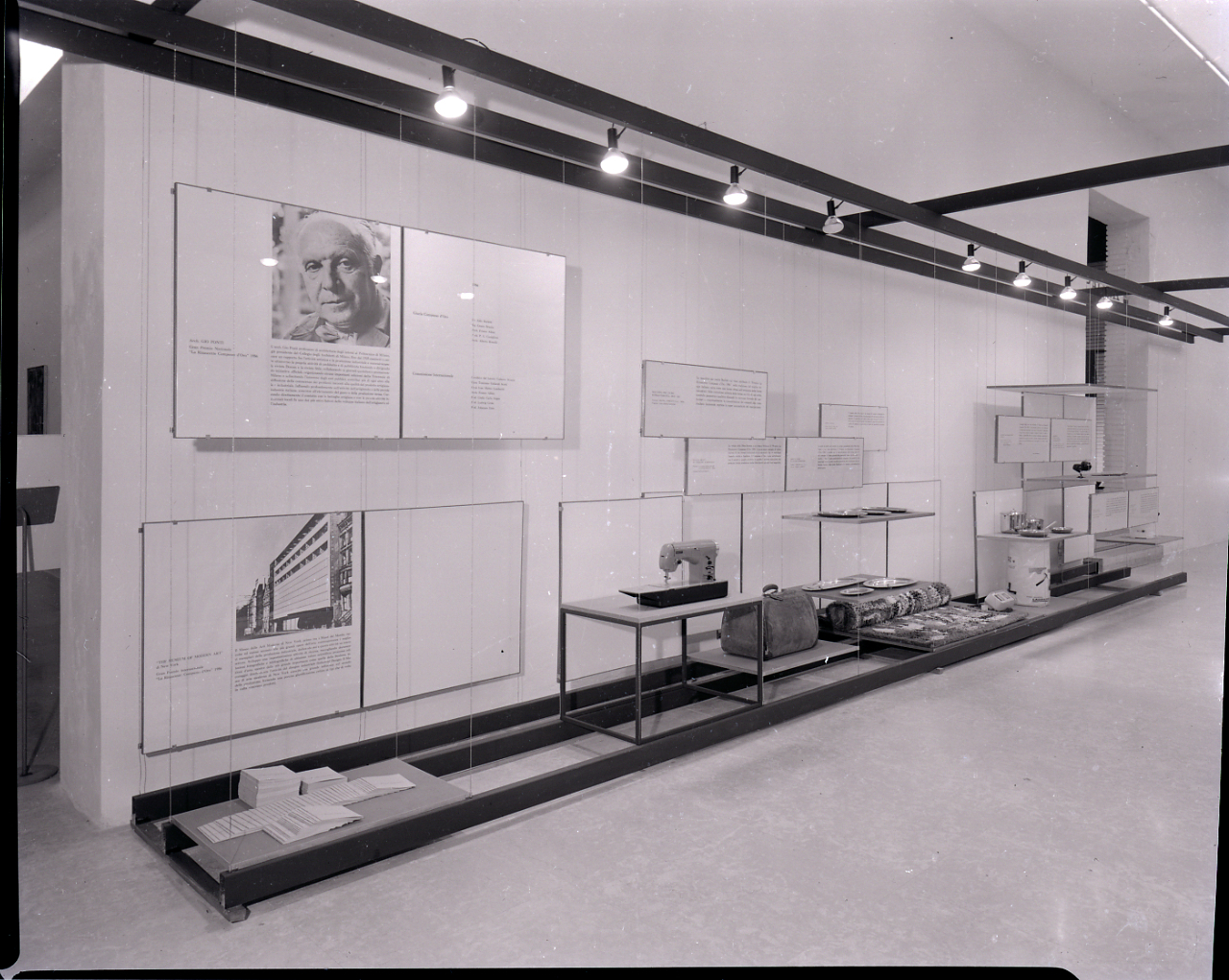
La Rinascente Compasso d'Oro, Edition III, Milan 1956 (Paolo Monti photograph)

The Compasso d′Oro was established in 1954, and it is the highest honour in the field of industrial design in Italy, comparable to other prestigious international awards such as the Good Design award, iF Design Award, Red Dot Award, the Cooper-Hewitt National Design Awards, and the Good Design Award (Japan). It was the first award of its kind in Europe and became internationally significant.

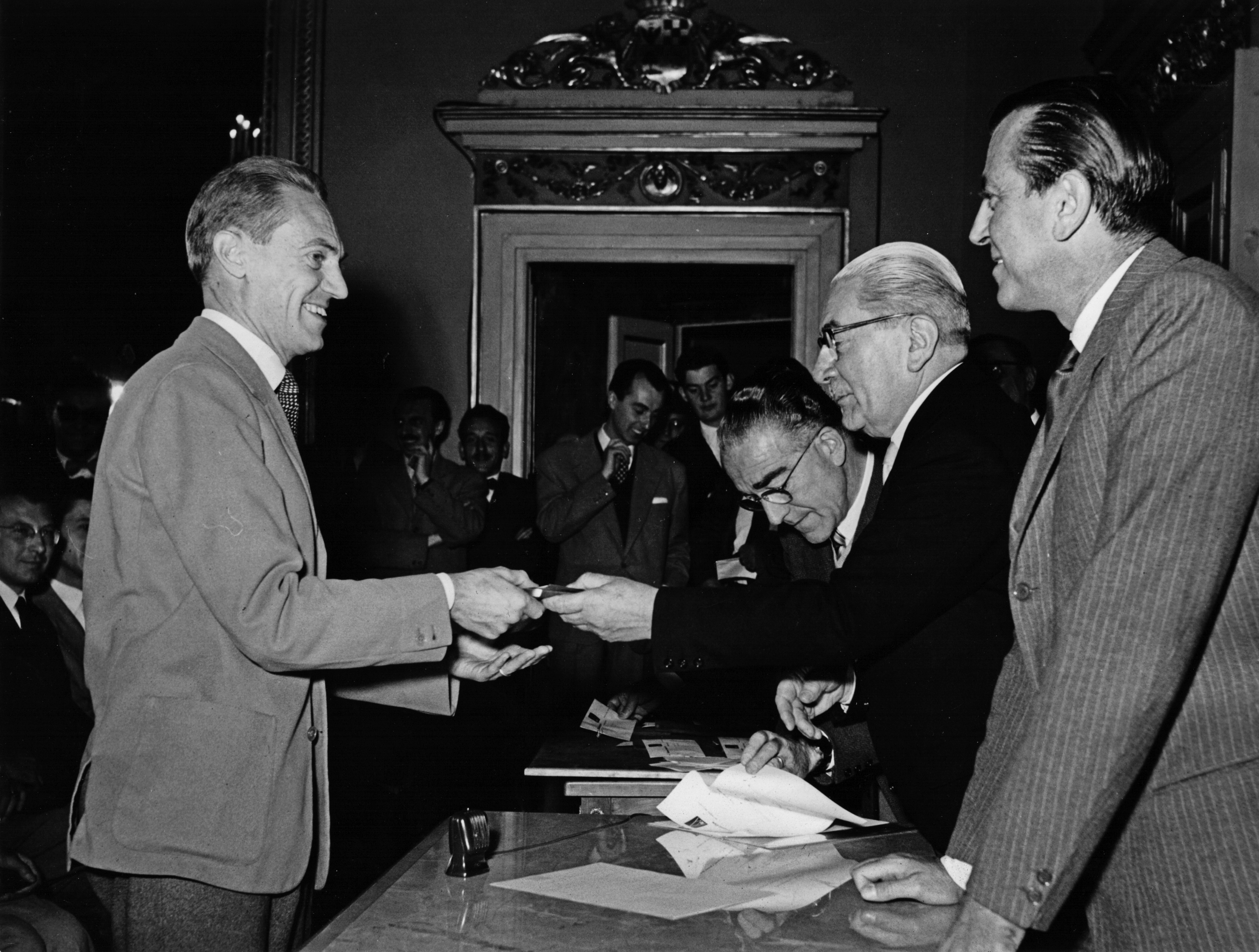
Pier Giacomo Castiglioni receives the Compasso d'Oro for the Luminator floor lamp designed for Gilardi & Barzaghi (1955)

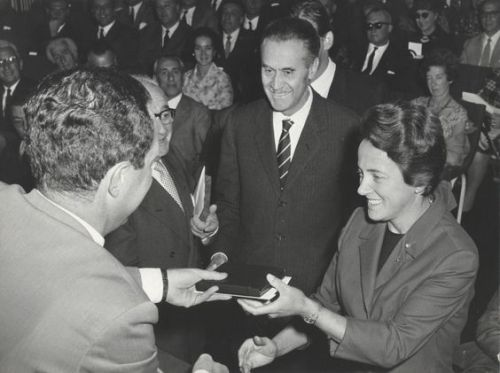
Franca Helg and Franco Albini receive the award for their work on the Milan Metro (1964)

The original idea for the award is credited to designer Gio Ponti and Alberto Rosselli. Many other leading architects and designers of the era, including the Castiglioni brothers (Livio, Pier Giacomo, and Achille), Albe Steiner, Enzo Mari and Marco Zanuso, were involved in aspects of its inception and early development. The Compasso d'Oro logo (designed by Steiner) and award trophy invoke the drafting compass invented by Adalbert Göringer in 1893 to measure the Golden Section.

The Italy Industrial Designing Association manages the Compasso d'Oro, and it is also a member of the International Industrial Designing Committee and the European Designing Bureau.

Since its inception, approximately 350 designers have been honoured with the award, for designs covering a wide range – from automobiles and bicycles to furniture and household objects, portable sewing machines, typewriters, calculators, clocks, lighting as well as concepts and systems, technical equipment, and yachts.

For the first time, the 2020 Compasso d'Oro included a "Products Career Award" which was given to three historical designs that have proven to be highly successful over time but were not awarded at the time of their inception: a 1962 floor lamp, Arco, by Pier Giacomo and Achille Castiglioni; a 1978 bed design, Nahalie, by Vico Magistretti; and the now famous 1968 Sacco bean-bag chair designed by Piero Gatti, Cesare Paolini, and Franco Teodoro.

The ADI Design Museum in Milan houses the historical collection of the ADI Compasso d'Oro Foundation, as well as temporary exhibitions. On 22 April 2004, the Ministry of Cultural Heritage and Activities and Tourism – through its Superintendency for Lombardy – declared the collection of "exceptional artistic and historical interest", thus making it part of the national cultural heritage. In 2020, the Milan square where the ADI Design Museum is situated was renamed "Piazza Compasso d'Oro" to honour the cultural and historical significance of the award.

The inaugural ADI "Compasso d'Oro International Award" will be held at the Expo 2025 in Osaka, Japan. The winning entries will be exhibited in the Italian pavilion.

In 2025, Treccani published a comprehensive history of the Compasso d'Oro. The volume is over 1,000 pages and includes 2,275 images that document the ADI museum's collection dating from its 1954 inception through to 2022. It is published in both Italian and English versions.

== List of Compasso d'Oro Awards ==
	Year	Jury	President	Entries	Winners
1st	1954	Aldo Bassetti, Cesare Brustio, Gio Ponti, Alberto Rosselli, Marco Zanuso		5700	15
2nd	1955	Aldo Bassetti, Cesare Brustio, E. N. Rogers, Alberto Rosselli, Marco Zanuso		1300	12
3rd	1956	Aldo Bassetti, Cesare Brustio, Franco Albini, Pier Giacomo Castiglioni, Alberto Rosselli	Alberto Rosselli (Birth of the ADI)	1450	9
4th	1957	Aldo Bassetti, Cesare Brustio, Franco Albini, Pier Giacomo Castiglioni, Ignazio Gardella	Giulio Castelli	1200	5
5th	1959	Bruno Alfieri, Vico Magistretti, Giulio Minoletti, Augusto Morello, Giovanni Romano	Livio Castiglioni	1200	6
6th	1960	Lodovico Barbiano di Belgiojoso, Vico Magistretti, Augusto Magnaghi, Augusto Morello, Marco Zanuso	Franco Albini	800	10
7th	1962	Giulio Castelli, Franco Momigliano, Augusto Morello, Bruno Munari, Battista Pininfarina	Roberto Olivetti		9
8th	1964	Massimo Vignelli, Dante Giacosa, Vittorio Gregotti, Augusto Morello, Bruno Munari, Gino Valle	Aldo Basetti		6
9th	1967	Aldo Basetti, Felice Dessi, Gillo Dorfles, Tomás Maldonado, Edoardo Vittoria	Marco Zanuso		13
10th	1970	Francesco Mazzucca, Franco Albini, Jean Baudrillard, Achille Castiglioni, Federico Correa, Vittorio Gregotti, Roberto Guiducci, Albe Steiner	Anna Castelli Ferrieri		10
11th	1979	Andrea Branzi, Clino Trini Castelli, Massimo Morozzi, Angelo Cortesi, Gillo Dorfles, Augusto Morello, Arthur Pulos, Yuri Soloviev, Nanni Strada	Enzo Mari	1167	39
12th	1981	François Barrè, Cesare De Seta, Martin Kelm, Ugo La Pietra, Pierluigi Spadolini	Rodolfo Bonetto		16
13th	1984	Cino Boeri, Douglas Kelley, Antti Nurmesniemi, Giotto Stoppino, Bruno Zevi	Giotto Stoppino		11
14th	1987	Angelo Cortesi, Rodolfo Bonetto, Marino Marini, Cara Mc Carty, Philippe Starck	Angelo Cortesi		16
15th	1989	Pierliugi Molinari, Fredrik Wildhagen, Hans Wichmann, Cesare Stevan, Tomás Maldonado	Pierluigi Molinari		12
16th	1991	Silvio Ceccato, Marcello Inghilesi, Victor Margolin, Pierluigi Molinari, Antti Nurmesniemi, Vito Noto	Angelo Cortesi		14
17th	1994	Dante Giacosa, Vittoriano Viganò, Giovanni Anceschi, Paola Antonelli, Uta Brandes, Jacob Gantenbein, Marja Heemskerk, Vittorio Magnago Lampugnani, Marco Migliari, Gianemiglio Monti, Mario Trimarchi, Vito Noto	Augusto Morello		13
18th	1998	Achille Castiglioni, Giuseppe De Rita, Marianne Frandsen, Fritz Frenkler, Sadik Karamustafa, Tomás Maldonado, Marco Zanuso	Augusto Morello		15
19th	2001	Marie-Laure Jousset, Filippo Alison, François Burkhardt, Omar Calabrese, Francisco Jarauta, Maurizio Morgantini, Erik Spiekermann	Giancarlo Iliprandi		17
20th	2004	Tomas Maldonado, Fulya Erdemci, Robert Fitzpatrick, Yutaka Mino, Pietro Petraroia, Richard Sapper, Angela Schönberger, Tomàš Vlček	Carlo Forcolini		15
21st	2008	Mario Bellini, Moh-Jin Chew, Lieven Daenens, Carla Di Francesco, Carlo Forcolini, Norbert Linke, Emanuele Pirella, Richard R. Whitaker,	Miguel Milá		12
22nd	2011	Arturo Dell'Acqua Bellavitis, Chantal Clavier Hamaide, Umberto Croppi, Guto Indio Da Costa, Pierre Keller, Cecilie Manz, Clive Roux, Shiling Zheng			22
23rd	2014	Anders Byriel, Vivian Cheng, Giorgio De Ferrari, Stefan Diez, Defne Koz, Mario Gagnon, Paolo Lomazzi, Laura Traldi			23
24th	2016	Gabriella Bottini, Toshiyuki Kita, Mugendi K. M'Rithaa, Marc Sadler, Cinzia Anguissola d'Altoè Scacchetti, Yossef Schvetz, Walter Maria de Silva			
25th	2018	Carlo Galimberti, Nevio Di Giusto, Yongqi Lu, Francesco Trabucco, Motoki Yoshio	Francesco Trabucco		
26th	2020	Luca Bressan, Virginio Briatore, Jin Kuramoto, Denis Santachiara, Päivi Tahkokallio	Denis Santachiara		18
27th	2022	Mario Cucinella, Stefano Micelli, Cloe Piccoli, Annachiara Sacchi, Mirko Zardini	Annachiara Sacchi	292	20
28th	2024	Maria Cristina Didero, Luciano Galimberti, Francisco Gomez Paz, Renata Cristina Mazzantini, Toshiyuki Kita	Luciano Galimberti		20
29th	2026	Giovanna Carnevali, Lorenza Baroncelli, Giovanni Brugnoli, Luciano Galimberti, Jasper Morrison	Luciano Galimberti		20

== Gallery ==
Selection of winning designs

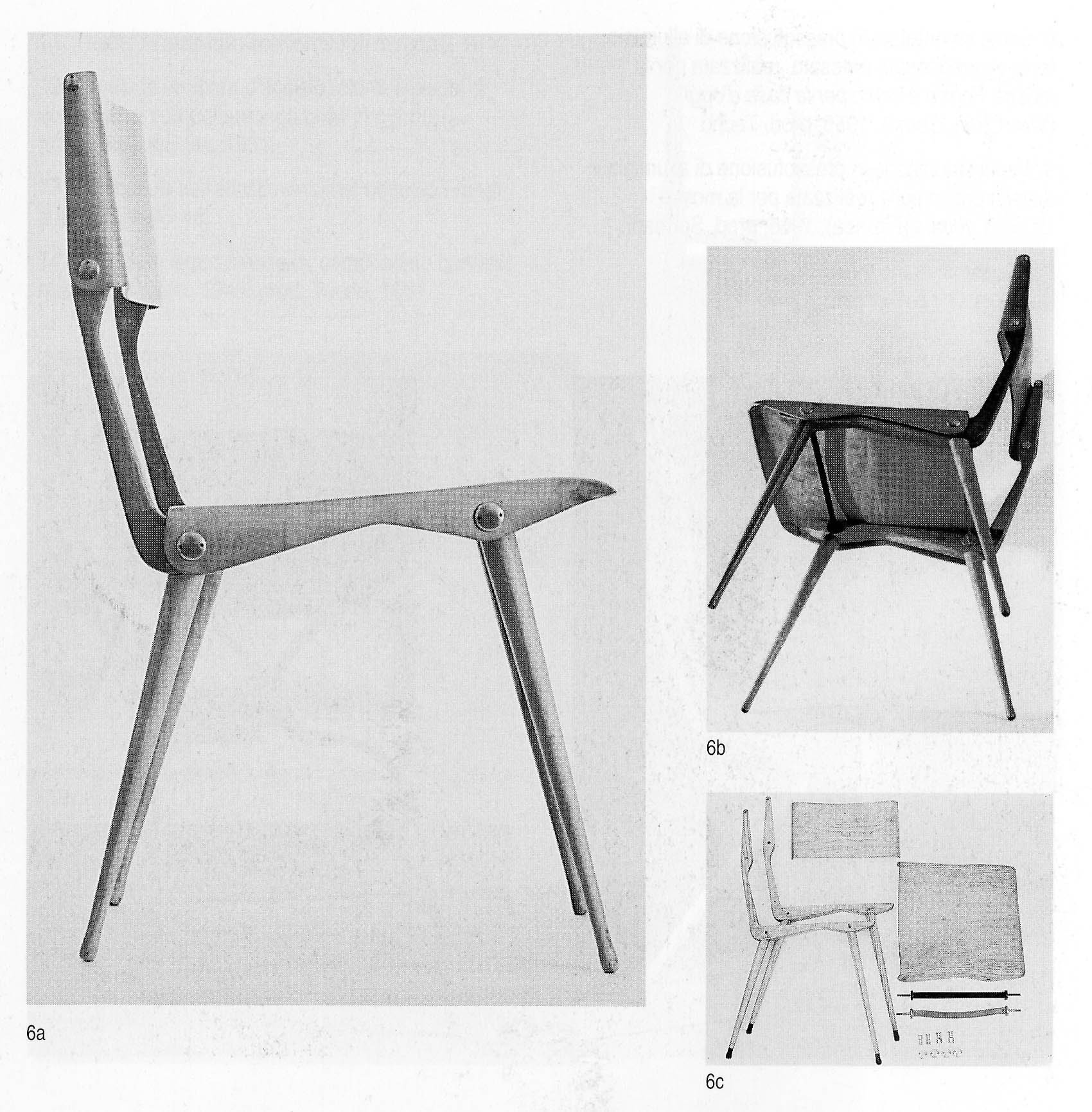
Cassina Model 683 chair by Carlo De Carli (1954 award)

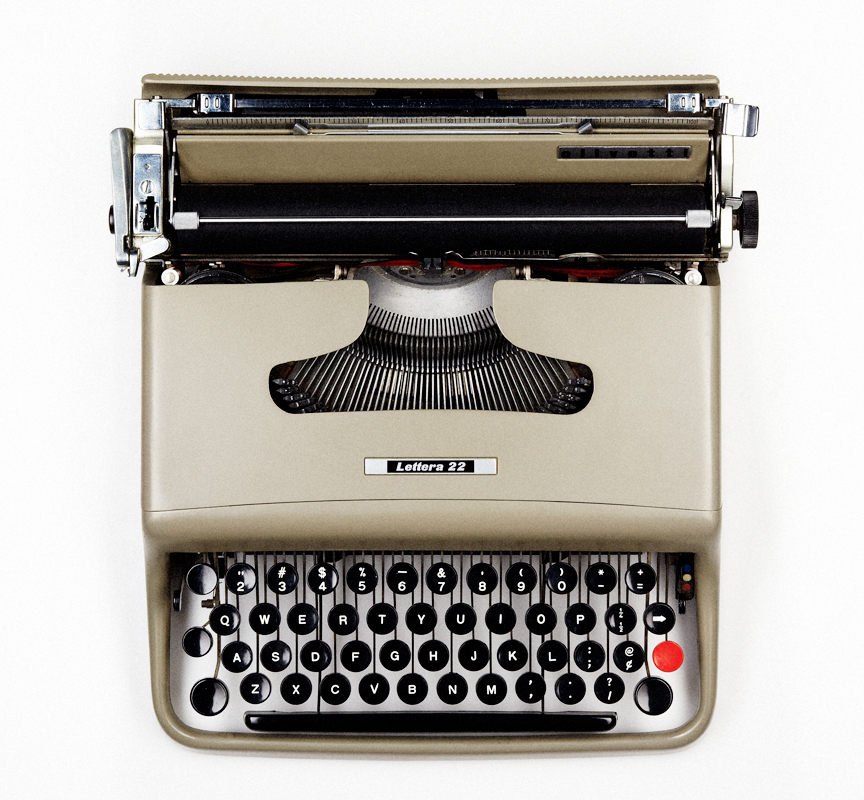
Olivetti Lettera 22 by Marcello Nizzoli (1954 award)

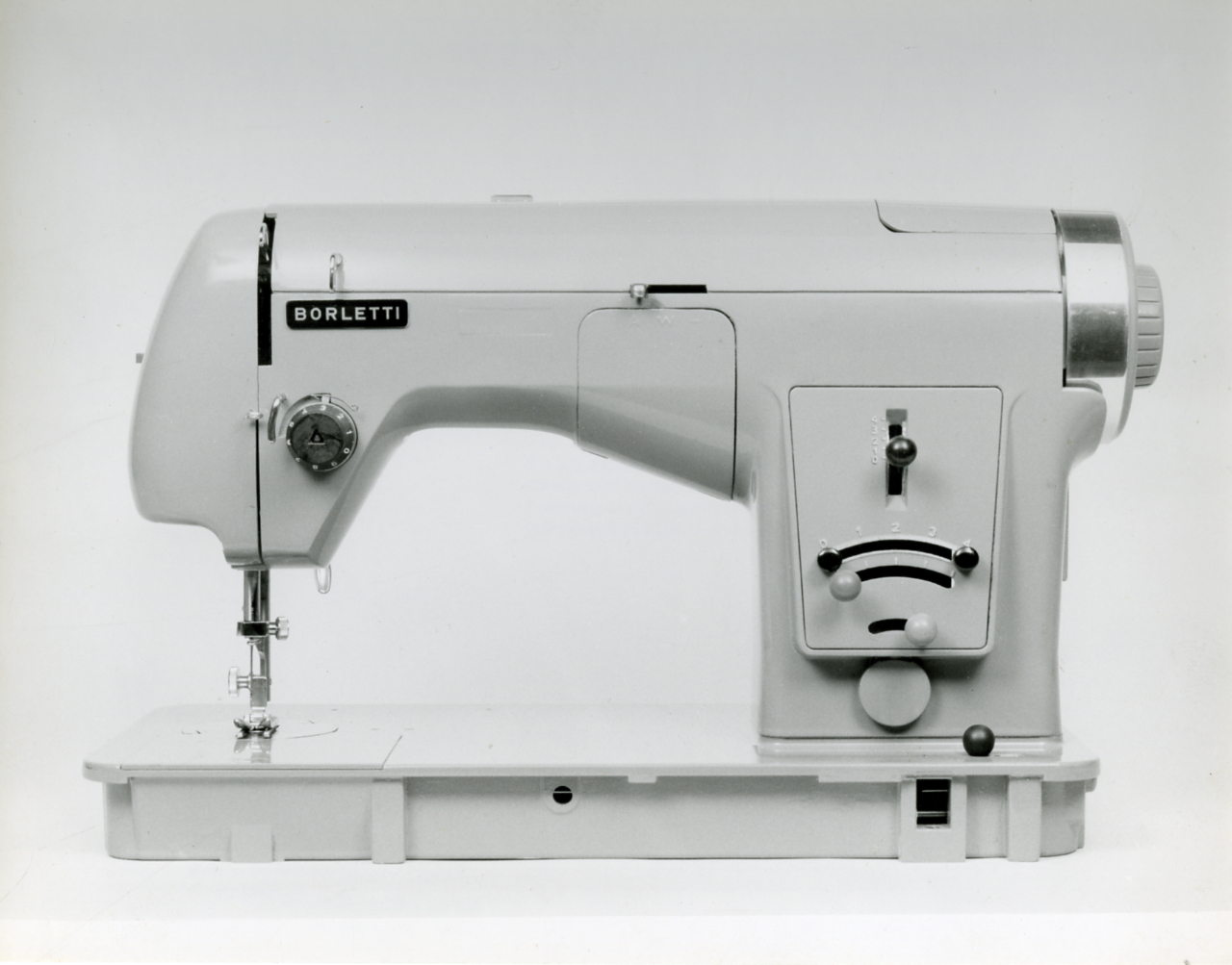
Borletti Model 1102 "Super-automatic" sewing machine by Marco Zanuso (1956 award)

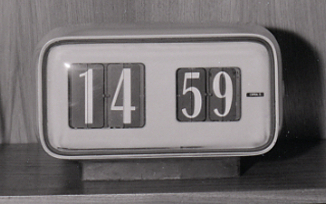
Solari Cifra 5 electric split-flap clock by Nani and Gino Valle (1956 Award)

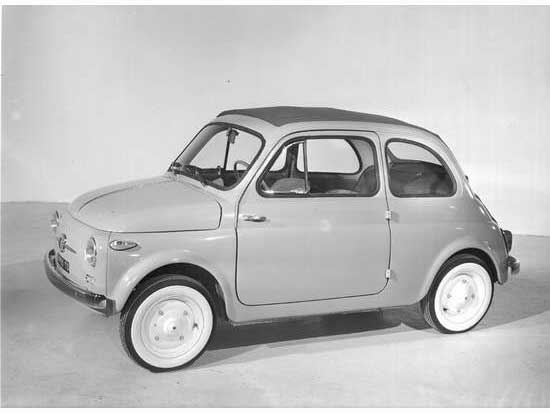
Fiat Nuova 500 by Dante Giacosa (1959 award)

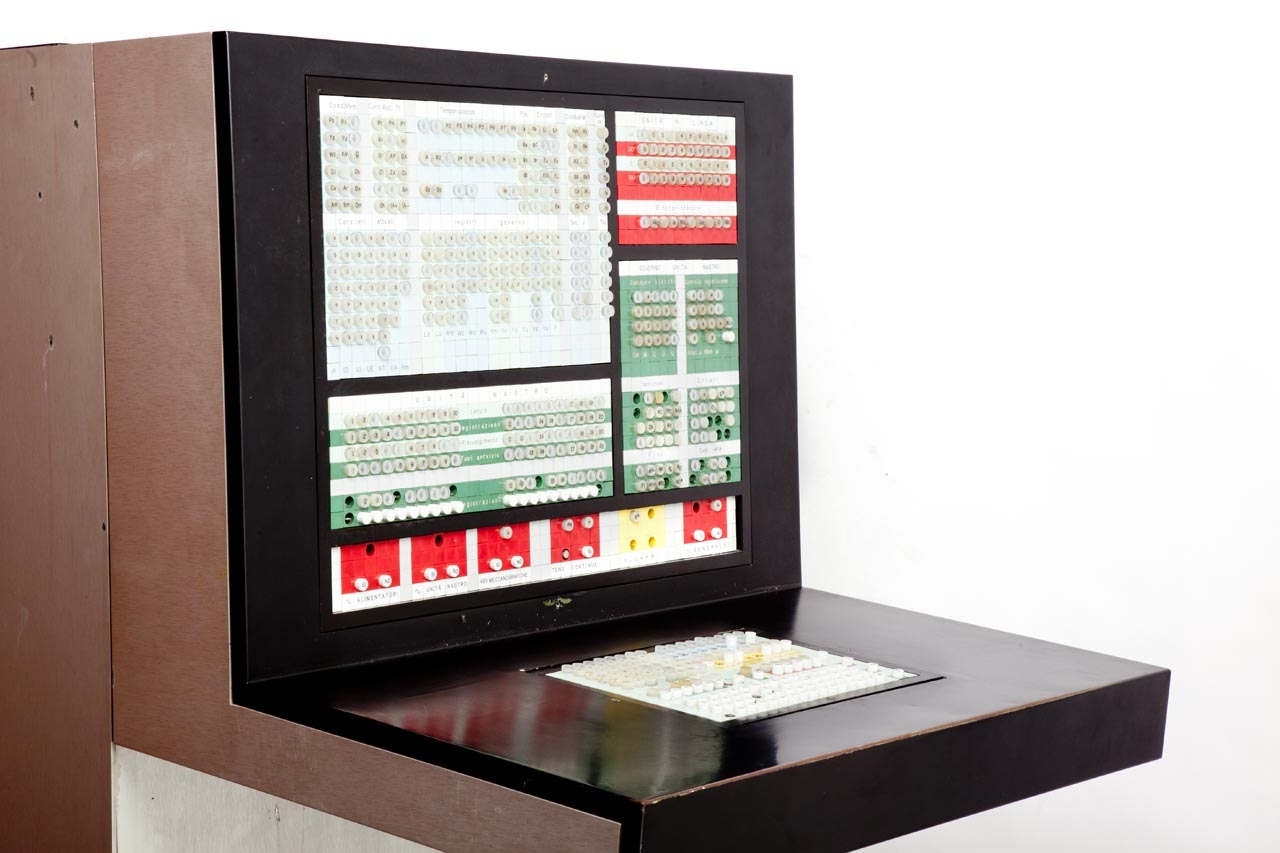
Olivetti ELEA electric calculator by Ettore Sottsass et al. (1959 award)

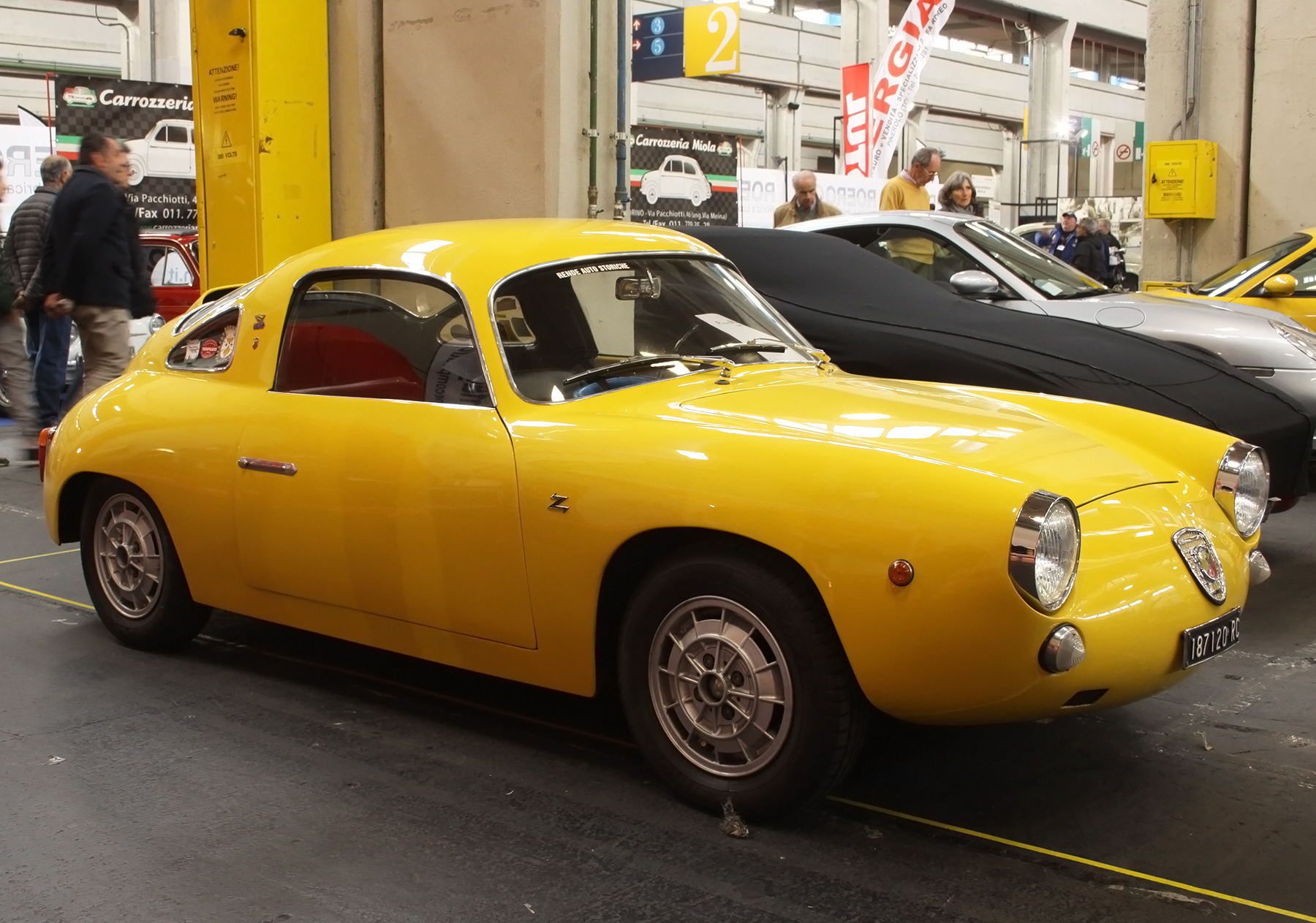
Abarth 1000 Bialbero by Ugo Zagato (1960 award)

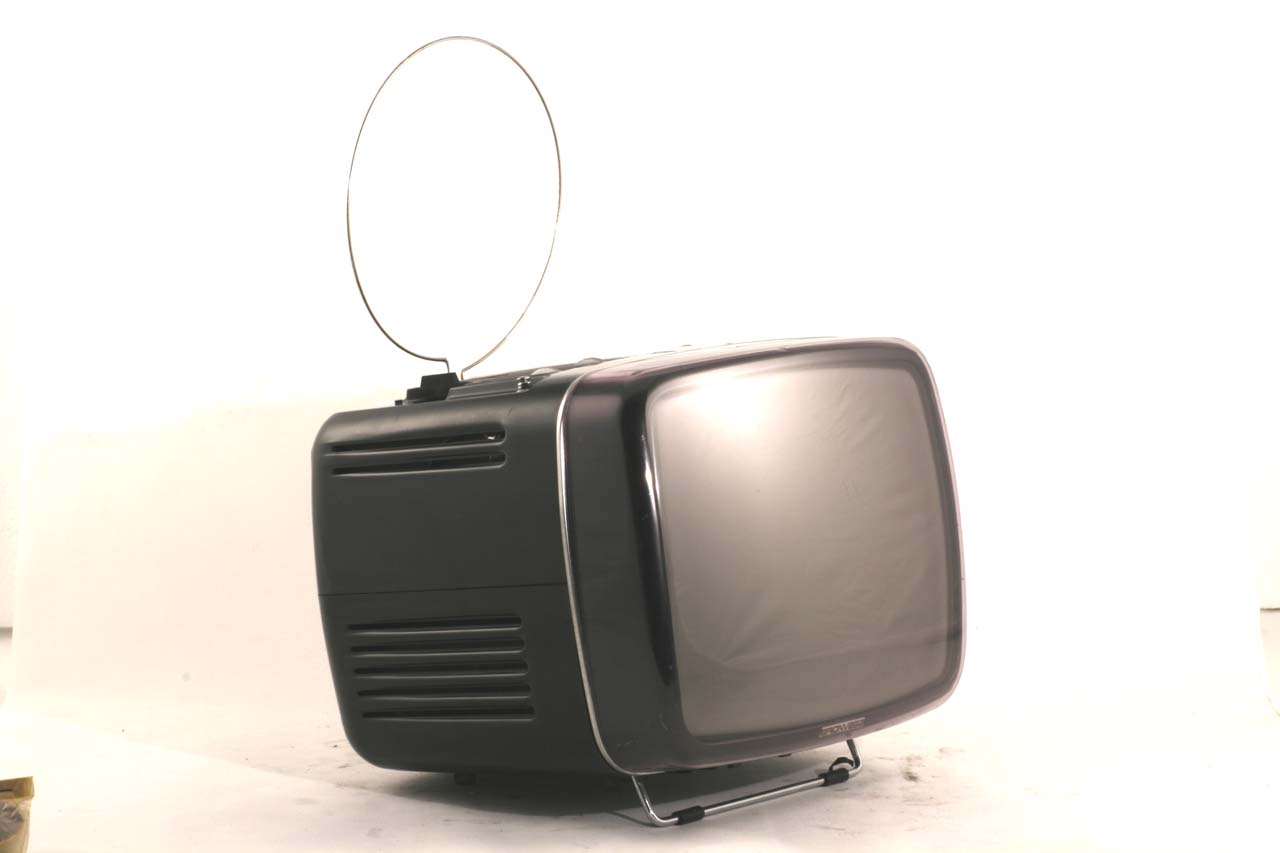
Brionvega Doney portable television by Richard Sapper and Marco Zanuso (1962 award)

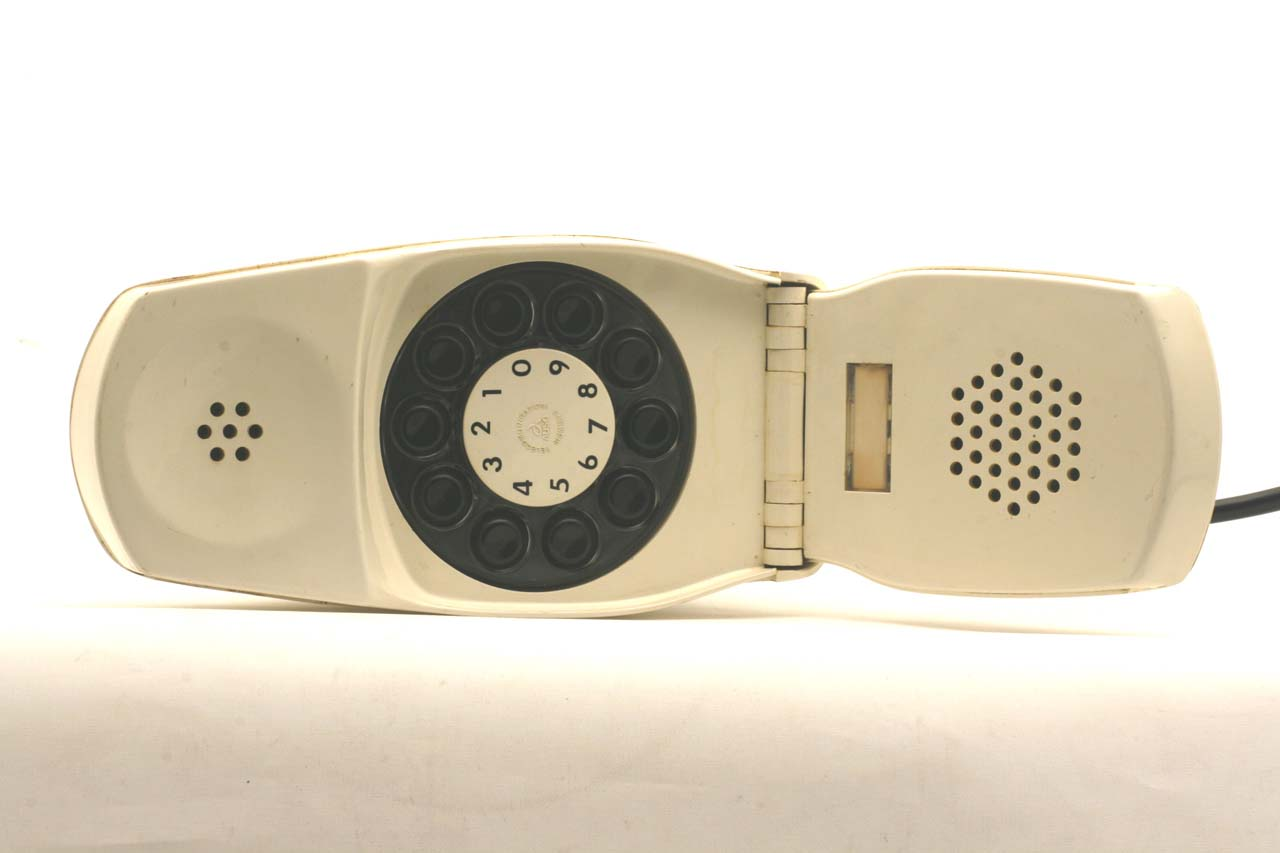
Grillo telephone by Richard Sapper and Marco Zanuso (1967 award)

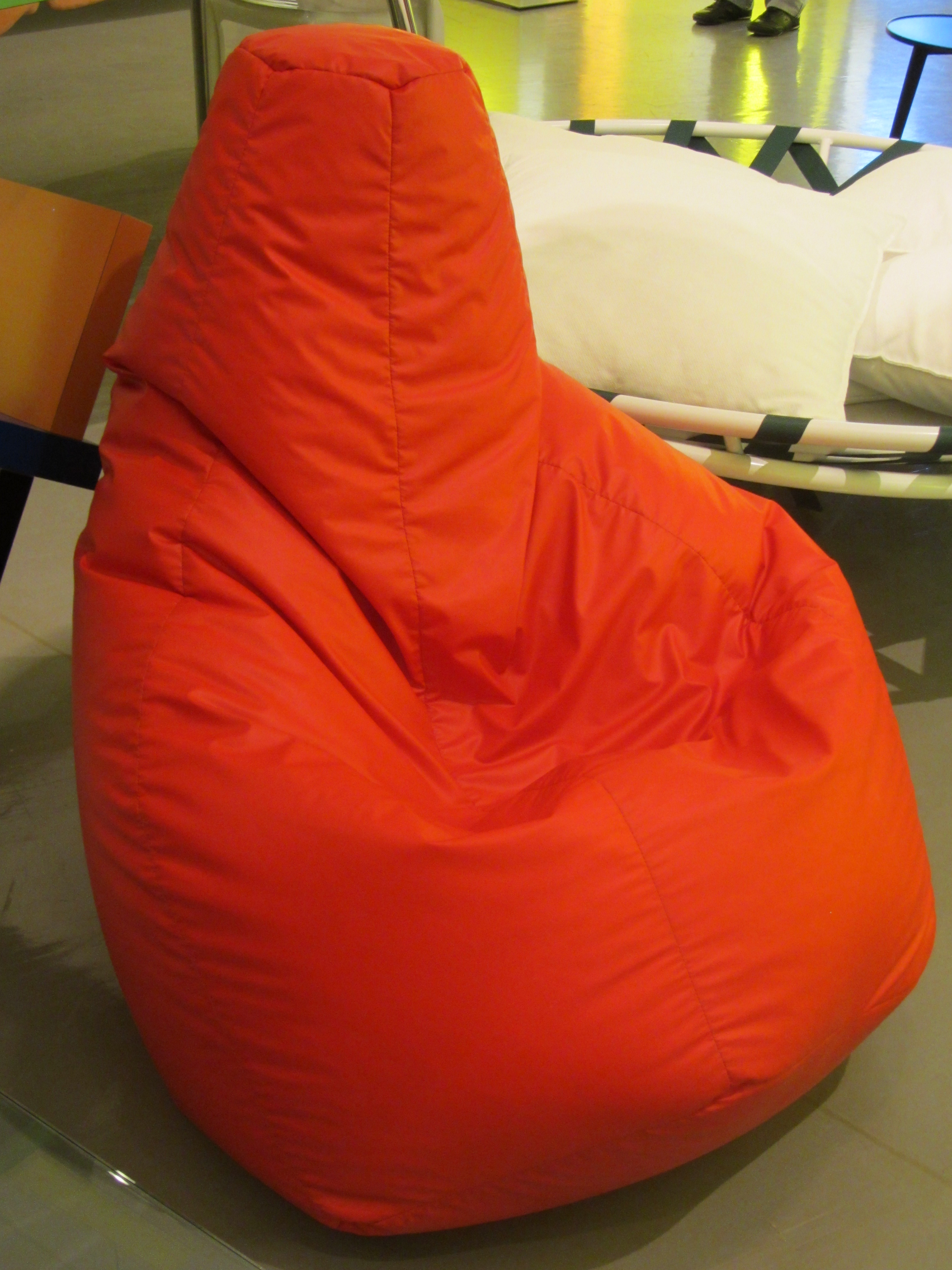
Zanotta Sacco chair by Piero Gatti, Cesare Paolini, Franco Teodoro (1968 design; 2020 award)

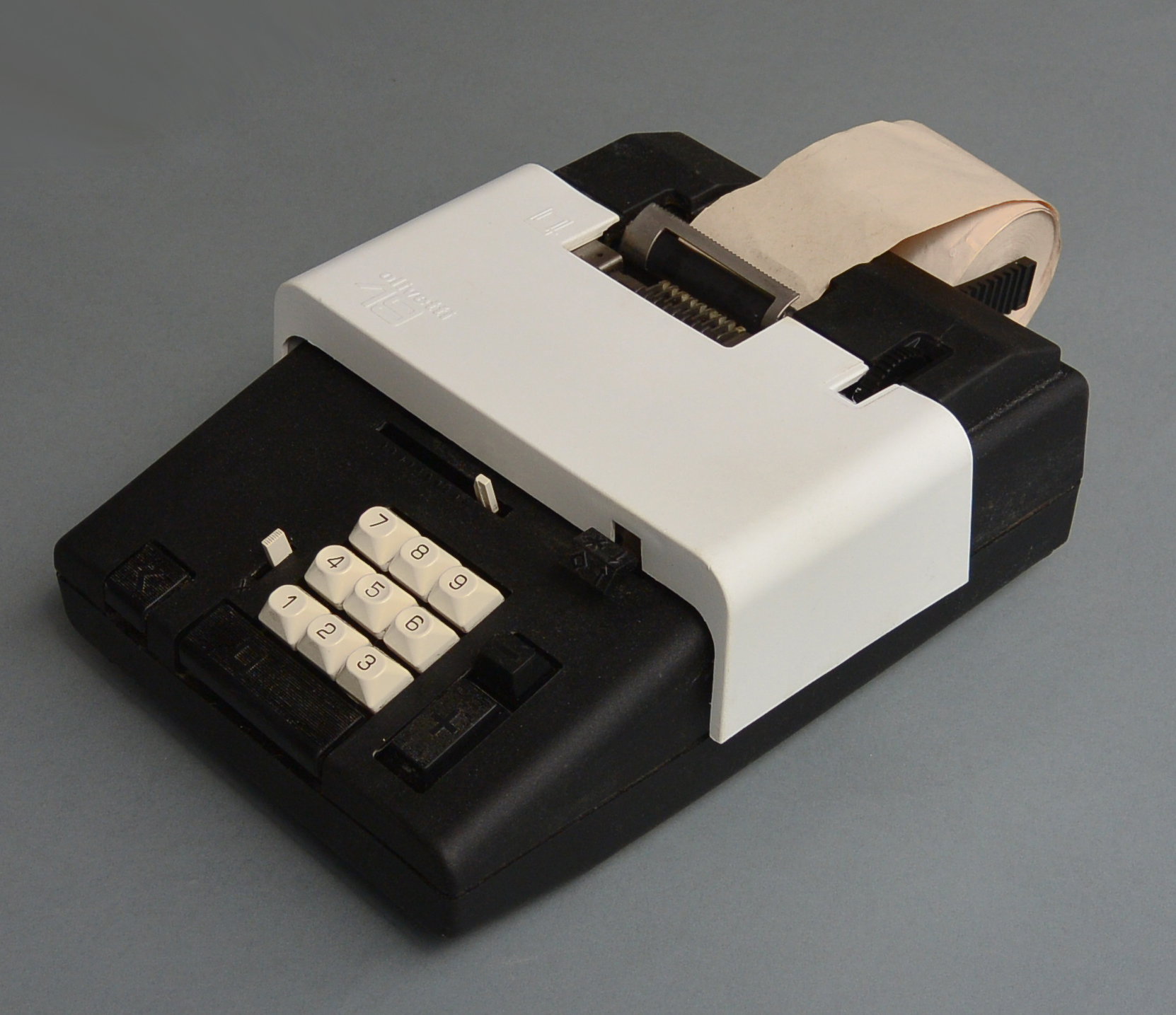
Olivetti SUMMA 19 by Ettore Sottsass and Hans Von Klier (1970 award)

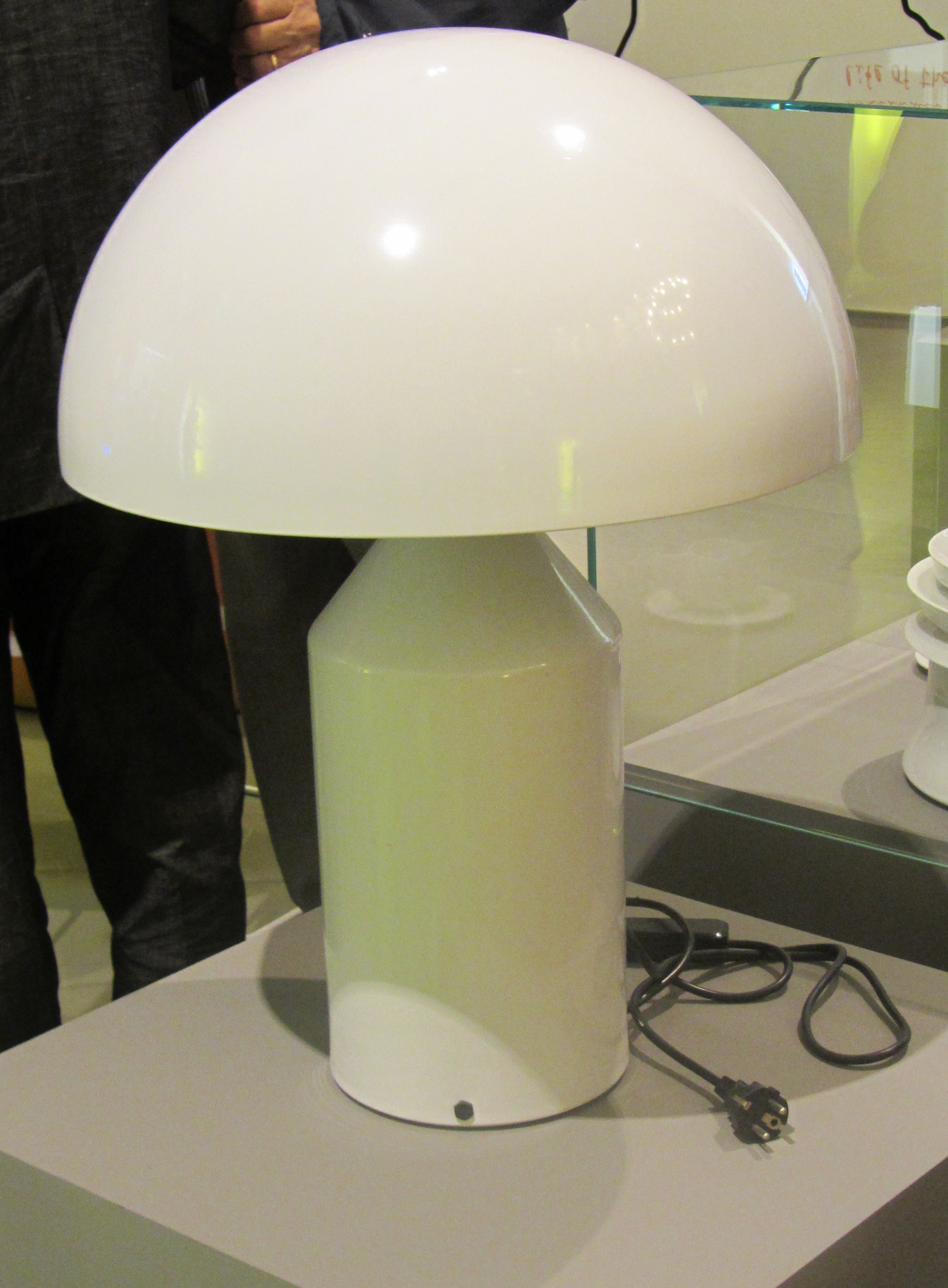
Oluce Atollo 233/D lamp by Vico Magistretti (1979 award)

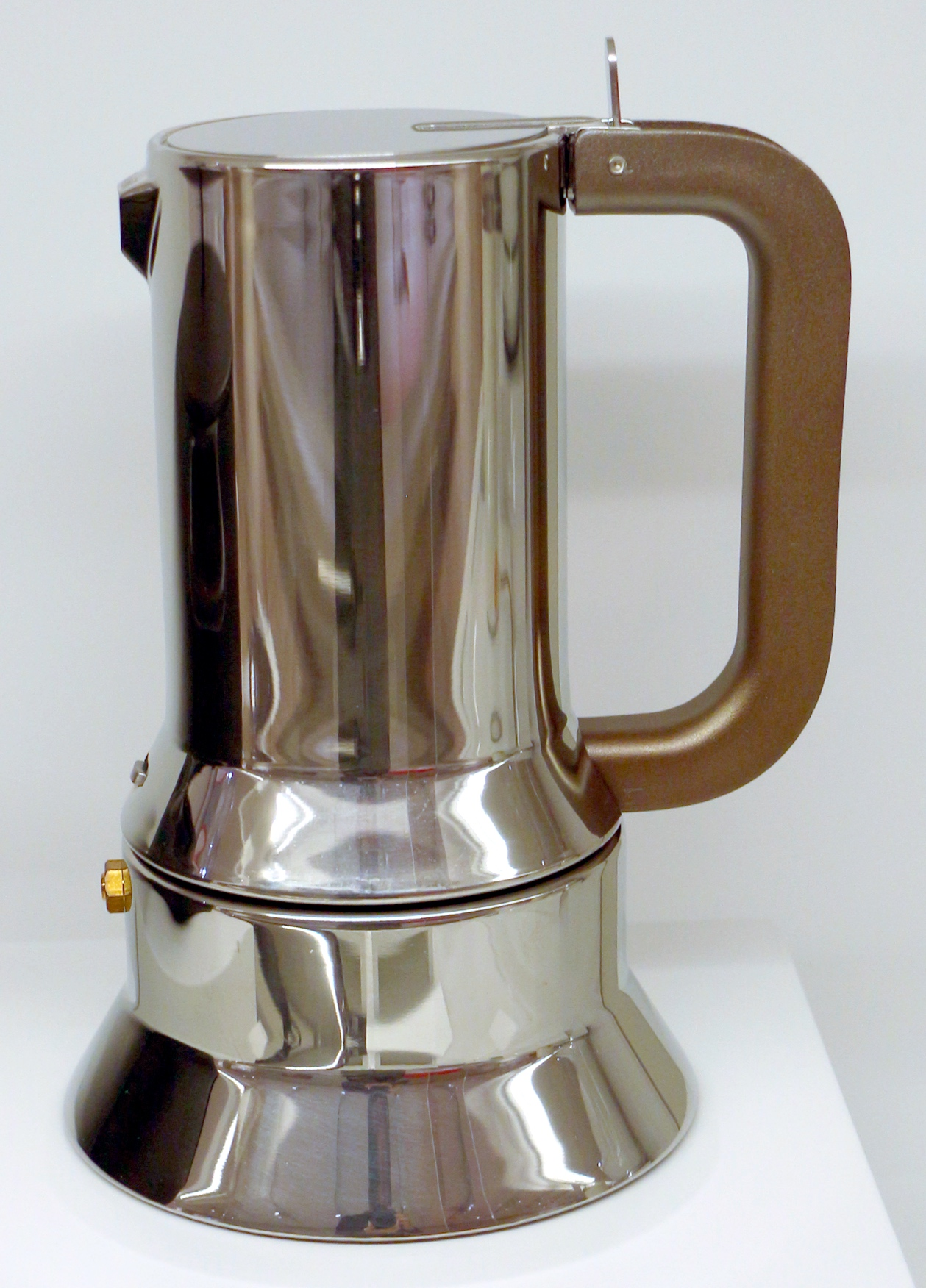
Alessi 9090 espresso maker by Richard Sapper (1979 award)

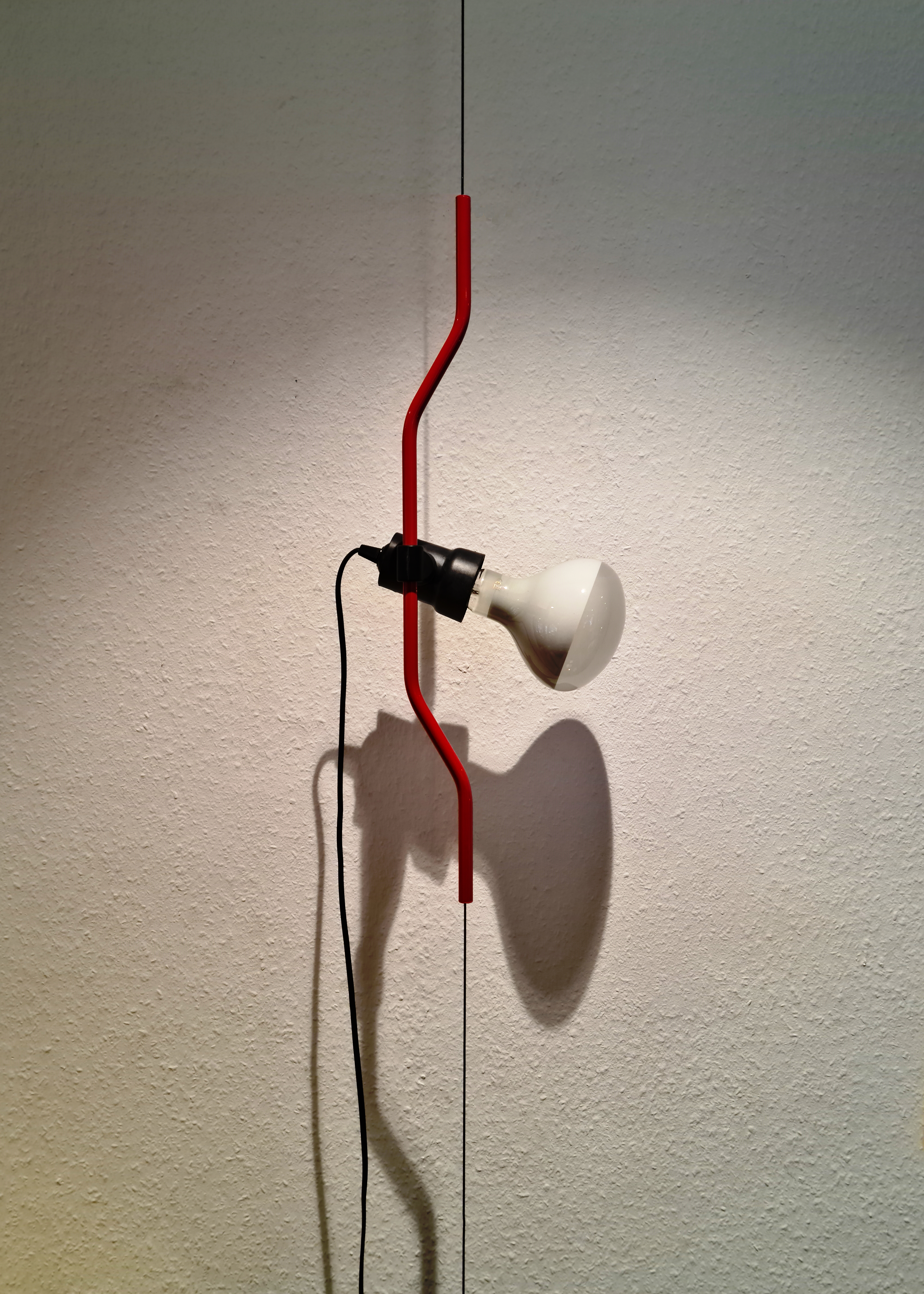
FLOS Parentesi lamp by Achille Castiglioni from a Pio Manzù concept sketch (1979 award)

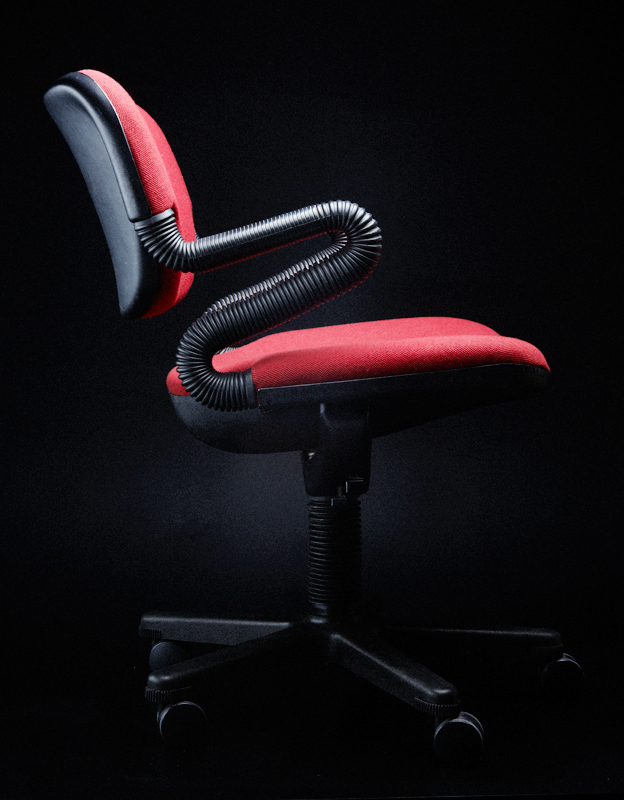
Castelli Vertabrae chair by Emilio Ambasz and Giancarlo Piretti (1981 award)

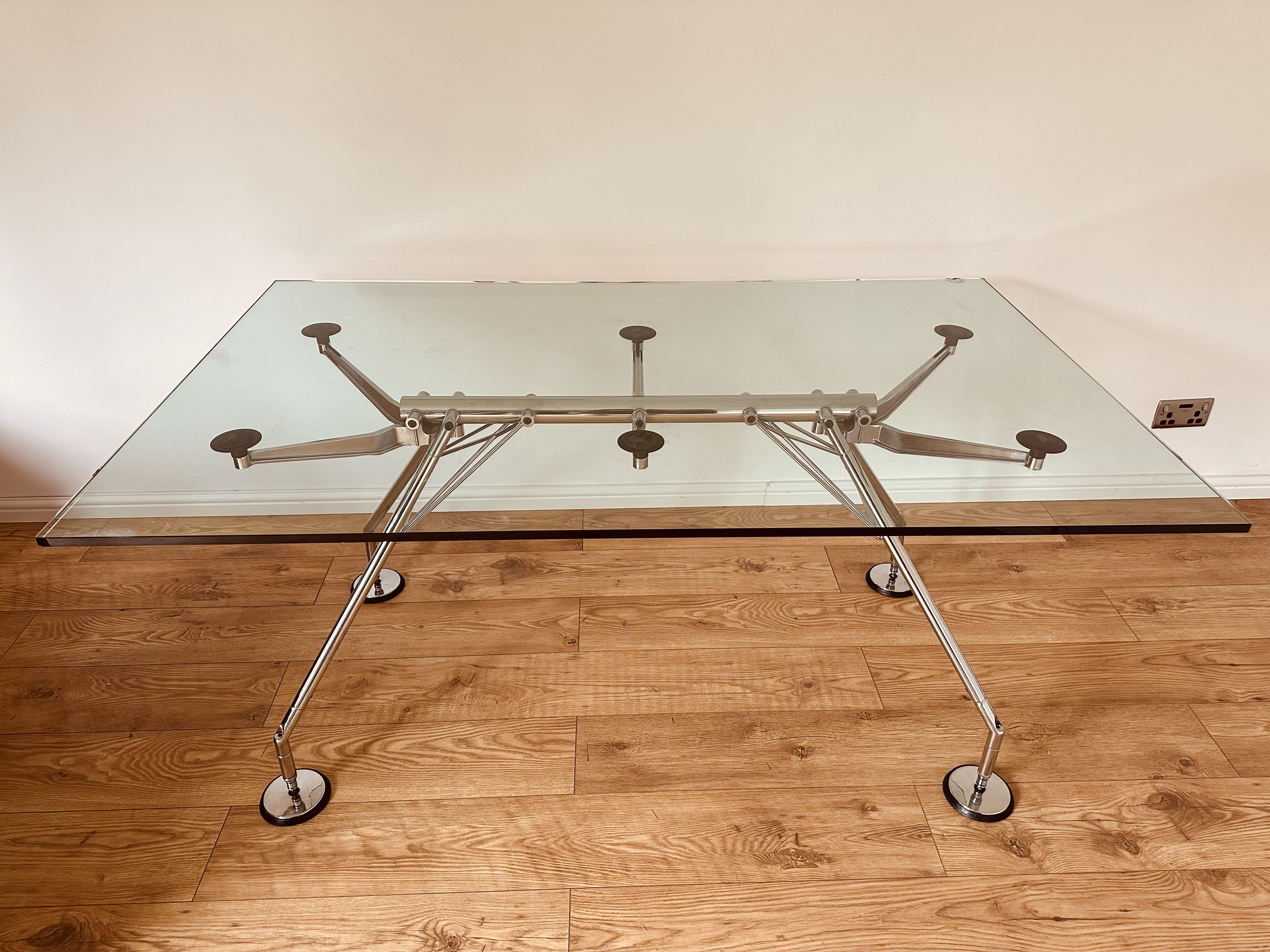
Tecno Nomos table and office desk system by Foster + Partners (1987 award)

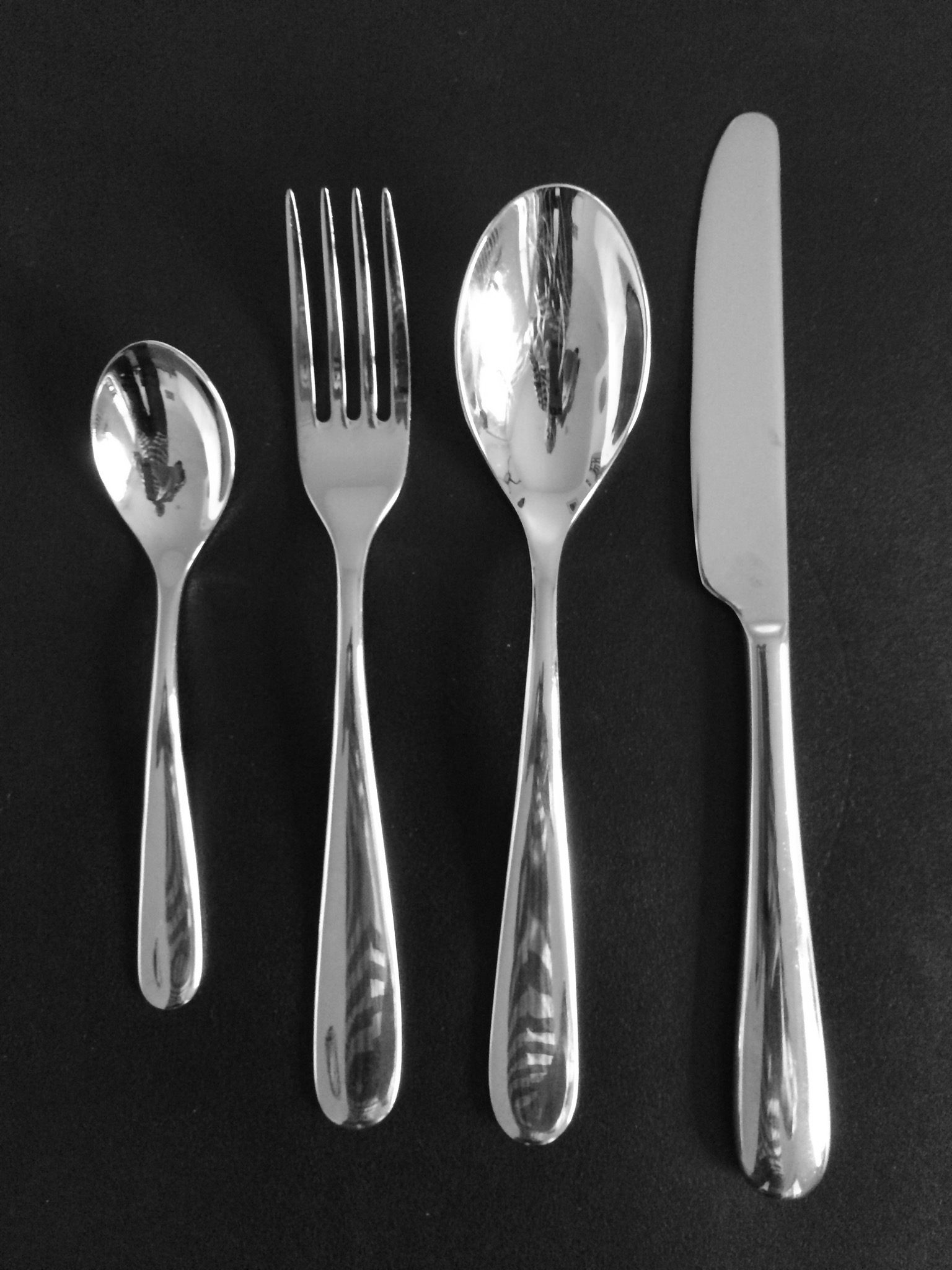
Alessi Nuovo Milano cutlery by Ettore Sottsass with Alberto Gozzi (1989 award)

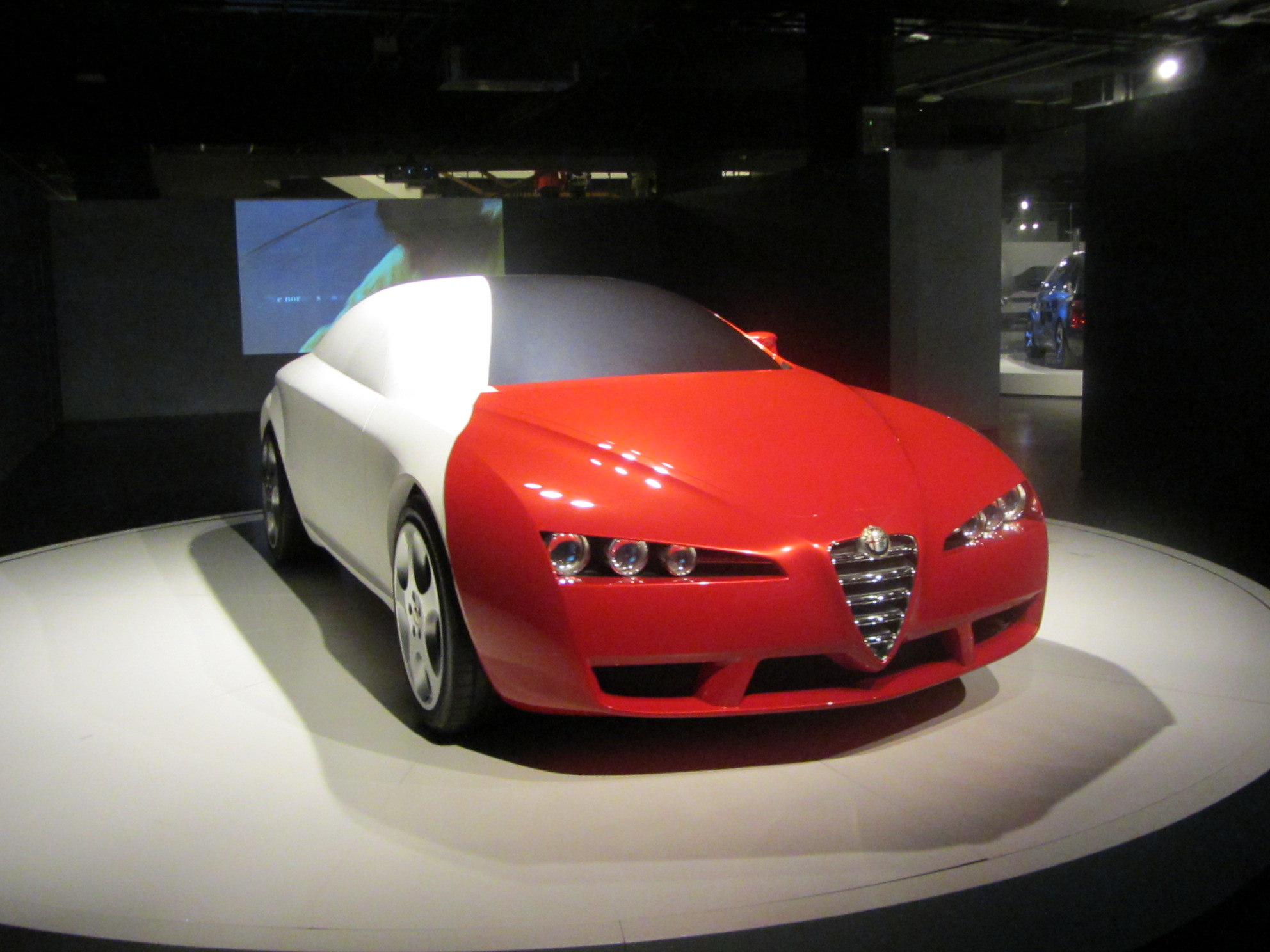
Alfa Romeo Brera concept prototype by Giorgetto Giugiaro (2004 award)

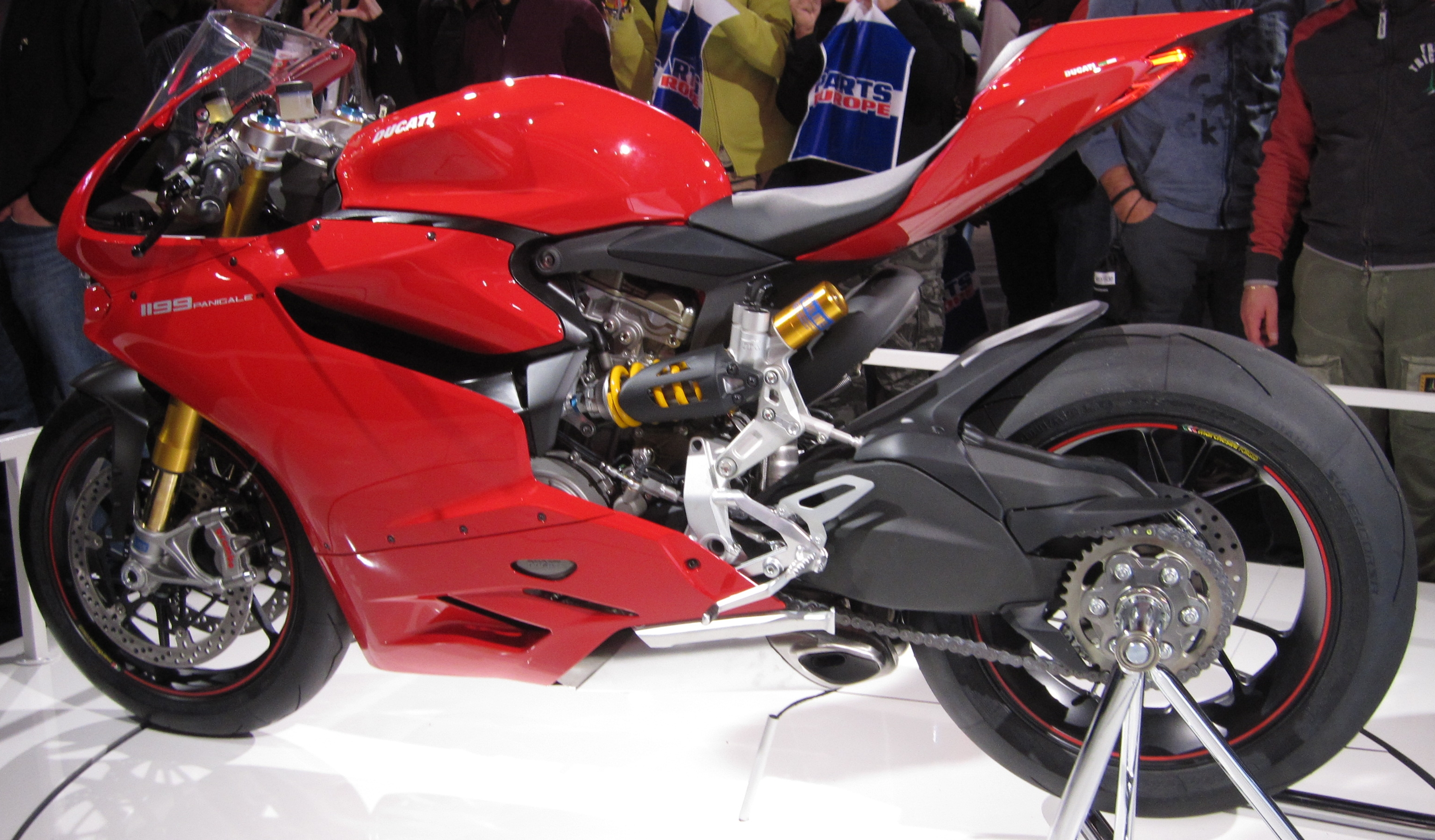
Ducati 1199 Panigale by Giandrea Fabbro and Ducati Design Center (2014 award)

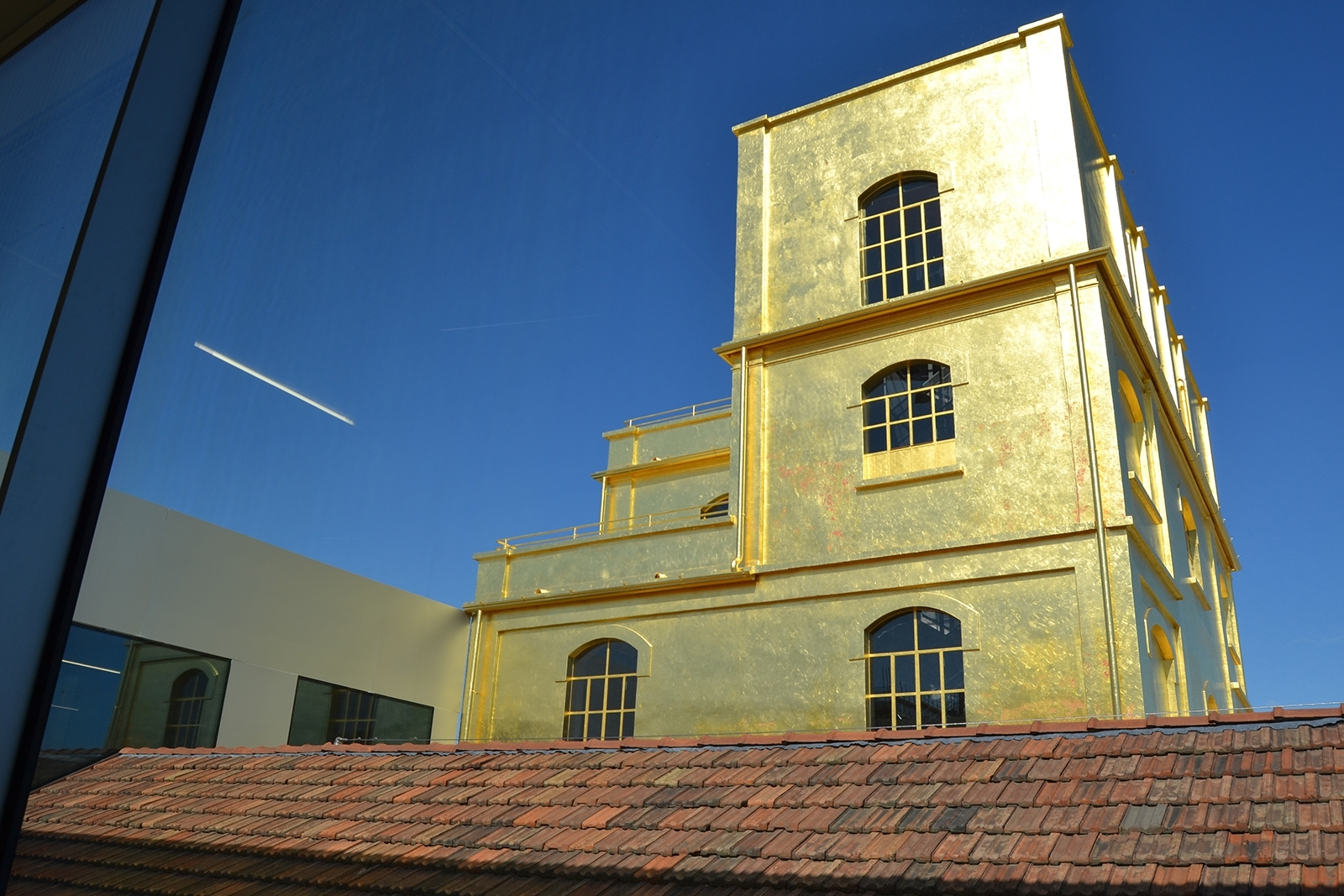
Fondazione Prada by Rem Koolhaas/OMA (2018 award)

== See also ==
- List of Compasso d'Oro recipients by year (in Italian)
- List of awards considered the highest in a field
- List of design awards
- List of industrial designers
