= Vito Noto =

Italian industrial designer

Vito Noto is a born Italian, naturalized Swiss industrial designer.

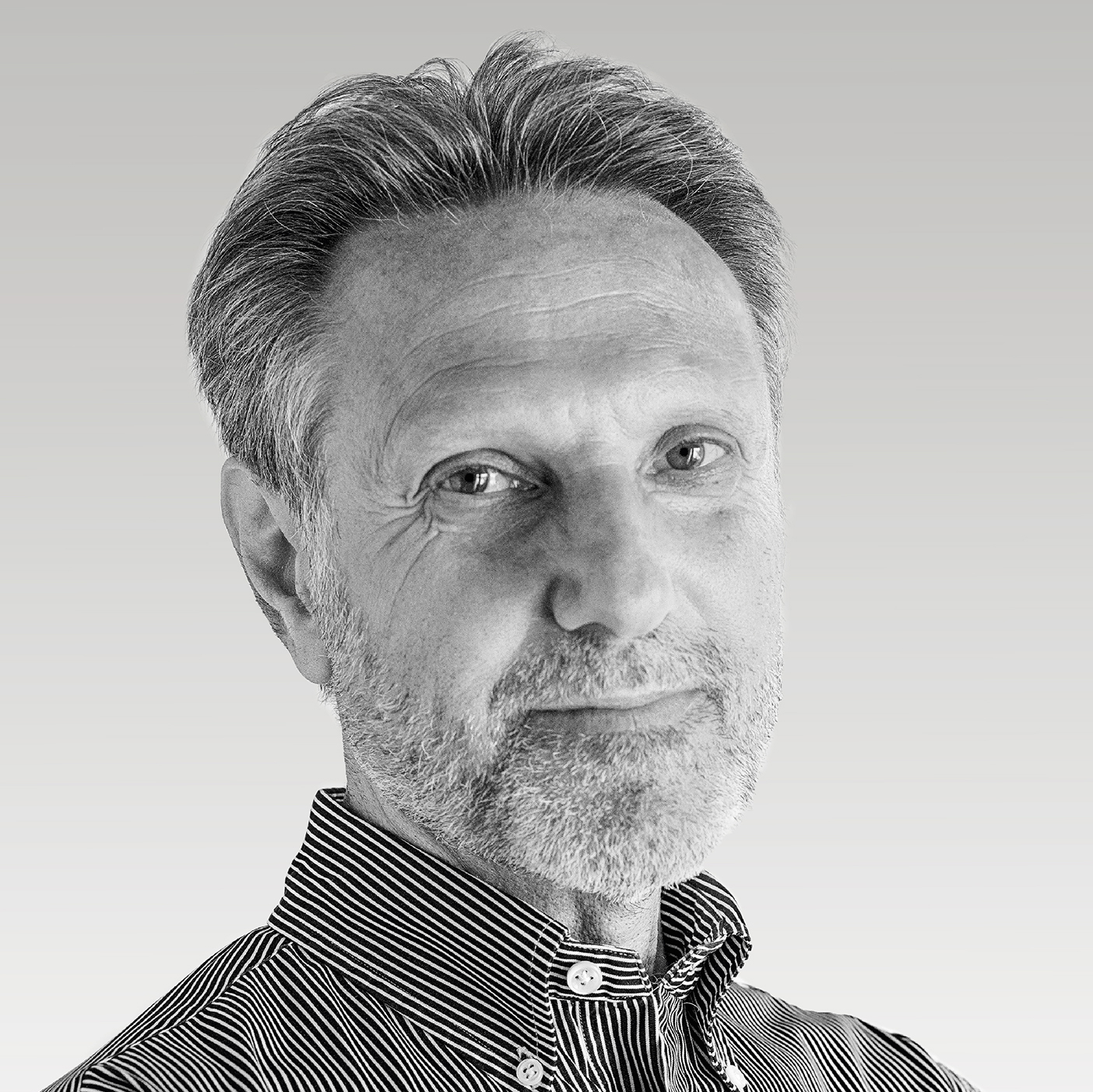
CEO Vito Noto Design

== Early life ==
Vito Noto was born in Ragusa, Italy, in 1955. His family moved to the Swiss Canton of Lucerne in 1958, then in 1969 to Canton Ticino.

He studied at the Scuola Politecnica di Design in Milan. After his studies he worked at various design studios in Zurich, Hamburg and Paris.

== Career ==
In 1982 he set up his own industrial design studio based in Cadro. With his team he has designed products for industries, furniture, graphic elements, website and machinery. He has received awards including: the Design Preis Schweiz, the Price Compasso d'Oro, and the IF Die gute Industrieform, ADI Design Index.

He teaches in technical institutes and universities. From 2005 to 2016 he held the position of President of the FotoClubLugano of Lugano.

== Awards ==
- IF Die gute Industrieform 1985, rotary transfer machine: “RM 16”
- Compasso d'Oro 1991, electronic franking machine: “GAMMA 25 Elettronica”
- IF Die gute Industrieform 1990, Vertical storage system: “LISTA AG”
- Compasso d'Oro 1994, operative vehicles from the storage room to the work places: “Clip Case/Clip Case Rack”
- Design Preis Schweiz 1995, operative vehicles from the storage room to the work places: “Clip Case/Clip Case Rack”
- Design Preis Schweiz 1995, electromedical laboratory for automatic analysis and preparation ofmicroplate samples: “Microlab F.A.M.E.”
- Compasso d'Oro 1994, System for citofluorometrics analysis: ”LYSET”
- ADI Design Index 2000, 24 hours clock: “Giorno/Notte”
- A DI Design Index 2002, Laboratory pipetting device: “PIPETBOY”
- StampNews.com: Top 10 most important postage stamps 2011, Fürstentum Liechtenstein: “Renewable energy”
- A DI Design Index 2016, equipment for the textile/weaving industry: "ECOSMART"

== Publications ==
- DESIGNsuisse
- SWISS DESIGN
- Ticino Business
- PlastDesign
- Giornale del Popolo
- Cooperazione

== Exhibitions ==
"Quarant'anni di grafica e design. Il senso delle idee". A journey through the graphic and industrial design works of the famous designer, coming from the m.a.x. Chiasso museum as part of the IDesign 2022 event. 8 May - 2 October 2022. "m.a.x. museo", Chiasso. 21 October - 11 December 2022. "Museo regionale d'Arte Moderna e Contemporanea, palazzo Belmonte Riso", Palermo.

"Archivi Grafici/Graphic Archives". A selection of approximately 300 works held in the graphic archives of the Chiasso Cultural Center, which have taken shape over the years thanks to bequests from internationally renowned artists and graphic designers (Franco Grignani, Lora Lamm, Giovanna Graf, Simonetta Ferrante, Heinz Waibl, Bruno Monguzzi, Orio Galli and Vito Noto), as well as through art acquisitions by art lovers and philanthropists, as well as by the "Amici del m.a.x. museo" association. 8 June - 22 September 2024. "m.a.x. museo", Chiasso.
