= Filippo Alison =

Italian architect and designer (1930–2015)

- Born: 1930; Torre Annunziata, Kingdom of Italy
- Died: 2015 (aged 84–85); Naples, Italy
- Occupation: Architect
- Employer: University of Naples Federico II

Filippo Alison (1930 – 2015) was an Italian architect, designer, and academic. His detailed study of 20th century furniture was instrumental in the historical preservation of many well known classic designs.

== Biography ==
Alison was born on 26 March 1930 in Torre Annunziata. His great grandfather was of Irish origin, and immigrated to Italy in the mid-19th century.

He received his degree in architecture 1957, and later became a professor of furniture and interior design at University of Naples Federico II.

Working together with Cesare Cassina in the late 1960s, Alison developed I Maestri collection of highly accurate and precise reinterpretations of iconic 20th century furniture designs. He is credited for being instrumental in the historical reconstruction and preservation of designs by Le Corbusier, Erik Gunnar Asplund, Gerrit Rietveld, Frank Lloyd Wright, and Charles Rennie Mackintosh amongst others.

In 2001 he was a member of the jury of the XIX Compasso d'Oro.

He died in Naples in 2015.
