= Gillo Dorfles =

Italian art critic, painter, and philosopher (1910–2018)

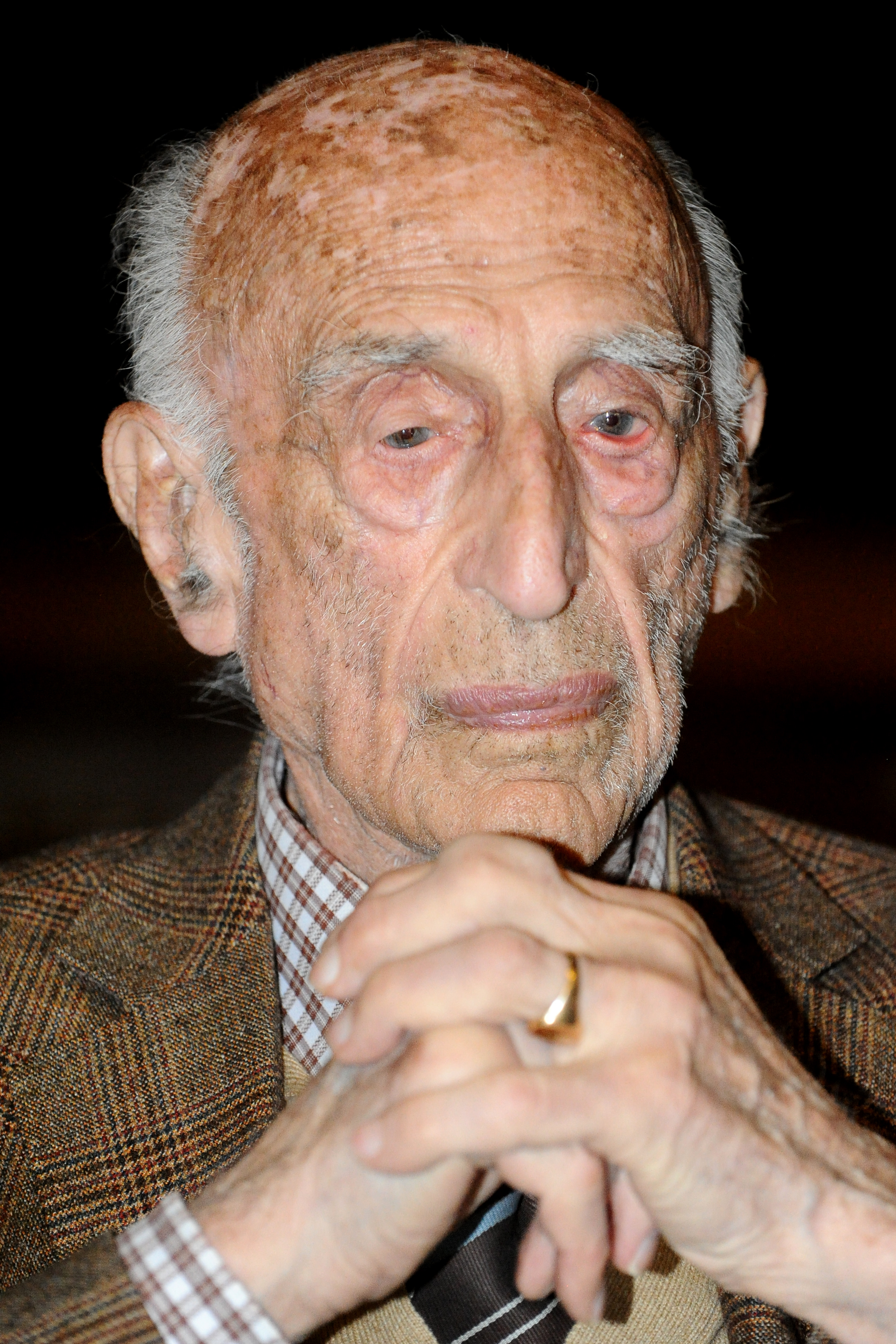
- Dorfles in 2013
- Born: Angelo Eugenio Dorfles; 12 April 1910; Trieste, Austria-Hungary
- Died: 2 March 2018 (aged 107); Milan, Italy
- Occupations: Art critic; painter; philosopher

Angelo Eugenio "Gillo" Dorfles (12 April 1910 – 2 March 2018) was an Italian art critic, painter, and philosopher.

== Biography ==
Born in Trieste to a Gorizian father of Jewish descent and a Genoese mother, Dorfles graduated in medicine, specializing in psychiatry. He was a professor in aesthetics at the University of Trieste, Milan and Cagliari and, in 1948, established the MAC (Movimento per l'arte concreta) with artists Atanasio Soldati, Galliano Mazzon, Gianni Monnet, and Bruno Munari. His paintings were displayed in two personal exhibitions held in Milan in 1949 and 1950 and also in numerous collective MAC exhibitions in the 1950s. In 1956 Dorfles co-founded the ADI (Associazione per il disegno industriale).

Having stopped painting, he devoted himself to the study of aesthetics and art criticism, dealing with the problem of the vanguard, the relationship between art and industry, analyzing artistic phenomena, and tastes in the contemporary society. According to Dorfles, aesthetics should focus on culture as a whole, which combine elements of fantasy, symbolic, metaphorical and even mythical suggestions. Among his major works, L'architettura moderna (1954), Kitsch (originally published in Italian in 1968 and translated in English the following year), La moda della moda (1984), Il feticcio quotidiano (1988), Horror pleni. La (in)civiltà del rumore (2008). In the same period, however, Dorfles continued to hold personal exhibitions: in 1986 his works were displayed in Milan, in 1988 in Aosta, and in 1996 in Rome.

In 2010, for his 100th birthday celebrations, L'avanguardia tradita took place at the Royal Palace of Milan. Another exhibition was held in 2012 at the Triennale di Milano, organized by Dorfles himself, entitled Dorfles. Kitsch – oggi il kitsch.

At 103, Dorfles published a new book (Poesie, Campanotto Editore, 2013), containing previously unpublished poems written from 1941 to 1952. In 2013 he was among the artists who designed the Tibetan pavilion at the 55th Venice Biennale.

Gillo Dorfles died in Milan on 2 March 2018, at age 107, one month before becoming 108.

== Selected bibliography ==
- Gillo Dorfles, L'architettura moderna, 1954
- Gillo Dorfles, Il Kitsch. Antologia del cattivo gusto, 1968
- Gillo Dorfles (with John McHale), Kitsch: The World Of Bad Taste, New York, Bell Publishing, 1969
- Gillo Dorfles, La moda della moda, 1984
- Gillo Dorfles, Elogio della disarmonia, 1986
- Gillo Dorfles, Il Feticcio quotidiano, 1988
- Gillo Dorfles, Horror Pleni. La (in)civiltà del rumore, Castelvecchi Editore, 2008
- Gillo Dorfles, Conformisti. La morte dell'autenticità, Castelvecchi Editore, 2008
- Gillo Dorfles, Fatti e fattoidi. Gli pseudoeventi nell'arte e nella società, Castelvecchi Editore, 2009
- Gillo Dorfles, Irritazioni. Un'analisi del costume contemporaneo, Castelvecchi Editore, 2010
- Gillo Dorfles, Dal significato alle scelte, Castelvecchi Editore, 2010
