= Giancarlo Iliprandi =

Italian graphic designer (1925–2016)

- Born: 15 March 1925; Milan, Italy
- Died: 15 September 2016 (aged 91); Milan, Italy
- Occupation: Graphic designer

Giancarlo Iliprandi (15 March 1925 – 15 September 2016) was an Italian graphic designer.

== Early years ==
Born in Milan, in 1949 Iliprandi graduated in painting and in 1953 in scenography from the Brera Academy. He was a self-taught graphic designer, inspired by Antonio Boggeri, Max Huber, Albe Steiner and Bruno Munari. In the early 1950s he had commissions from companies including RAI, Honeywell, Roche, La Rinascente, Fiat, Standa and Electa.

== Career ==
Starting from the 1960s, Iliprandi worked as art director for numerous magazines including Popular Photography Italiana, Phototeca, Sci nautico and Interni. He drew the covers for the records of the label I Dischi del Sole, and was responsible for the corporate identity of the companies Cucine RB, Ankerfarm and Stilnovo.

During his career he received several awards, including the Grand Prize at the XIII Triennale (1964), a prize at the first International Poster Biennale in Warsaw (1966), and four Compasso d'Oro. The Compasso d'Oro were in 1979 for the font Modulo and for the instrumental graphic of the Fiat 131 Mirafiori, in 2004 for the cover design of the magazine Arca, and in 2011 as a career award. In 2015 he released an autobiography, Note.
