= Norbert Linke =

German composer and musicologist (1933–2020)

Norbert Linke (5 March 1933 – 10 November 2020) was a German composer and musicologist.

== Life and career ==
Linke was born in Ścinawa, Province of Lower Silesia on 5 March 1933. While at school in Celle, Linke composed the Singspiel Der Nachtwächter (after the farce by Theodor Körner) and instrumental works. From 1952 to 1959 he studied composition at the State Academy of Music in Hamburg with Ernst Gernot Klussmann and Philipp Jarnach. During the Darmstadt International Summer Courses for Neue Musik (1962-1964) he received his "final touches" from Pierre Boulez, György Ligeti and Karlheinz Stockhausen. From 1962 to 1972 he was a teacher at the Albert-Schweitzer-Gymnasium (Hamburg), before he was a lecturer and professor in music teacher training at the FHS Darmstadt until 1976.

Linke became known mainly for chamber music, but also for vocal and orchestral music. Linke has received numerous composition prizes (Hilversum, Darmstadt, Hamburg several times, Hof, Munich, Bonn), including the 1977 Johann-Wenzel-Stamitz-Prize (Stuttgart). Since 1971 he has been a full member of the music section of the Freie Akademie der Künste Hamburg. From 1976 until his retirement he taught as a full professor of music at the University of Duisburg-Essen.

From 1985 to 1991 Linke was 1st chairman of the Deutsche Johann Strauss Gesellschaft and has been its honorary member since 2013. The Wiener Institut für Strauss-Forschung (WISF) also elected him as an honorary member in 2020.

His pseudonym was Aaron Aachen. Linke died on 10 November 2020, at the age of 87.

== Publications ==
- Musik zwischen Konsum und Kult. Wiesbaden 1974 (1976 3rd edition): Gesamtschau des Musiklebens in der BRD unter Auswertung des Springer-Archivs
- Neue Wege in der Musik der Gegenwart. Wolfenbüttel 1975: Unterrichtskonzepte zur Anregung des Musikalisch-Schöpferischen bei Schulkindern
- Philosophie der Musikerziehung. Regensburg 1976: First paper under this title; authoritative work on the appointment to the chair of the University of Duisburg
- Heilung durch Musik?. Wilhelmshaven 1977: First paper with didactic handouts on music therapy
- Wertproblem und Musikerziehung. Wolfenbüttel 1977: Establishment of a value didactics of music in empirical studies according to the psychoanalytical AWADUK principle in the investigation of a basic principle of musical values (K-S-T-Modell)
- Robert Schumann – Zur Aktualität romantischer Musik. with Gustav Kneip. Wiesbaden 1977: Ein Komponistenporträt als Unterrichtsreihe
- Musik in der sozialen Schule – Beiträge zu einer individual-psychologisch begründeten Musikdidaktik. Wilhelmshaven 1981: Über Alfred Adlers Anregungen zur Förderung der kindlichen musikalischen Kreativität
- Die Tätigkeit des Musiklehrers an allgemeinbildenden Schulen unter dem Gesichtspunkt der Langzeitplanung 1920–1980. Opladen 1982
- Johann Strauß (Sohn). Rowohlt Bildmonographie rm 50304, Reinbek 1982 (mehrere Nachauflagen, Übersetzungen ins Ungarische und Chinesische)
- Kein schöner Land. Niedernhausen/Taunus 1983 (numerous new editions): Historically accurate first releases of 100 of the most famous German folk songs with proof of origin, such as "Kein schöner Land"; drawings by Brian Bagnall; worldwide sales of 300,000 copies with 30 million folk song adaptations by N.L.; in several cases first-time research on the real authors
- Musik erobert die Welt – oder Wie die Wiener Familie Strauß die "Unterhaltungsmusik" revolutionierte, with a preface by Hans Weigel. Vienna 1987.
- Es musste einem was einfallen – Untersuchungen zur kompositorischen Arbeitsweise der "Naturalisten". Tutzing 1992.
- Franz Lehár. Rowohlt Bildmonographie rm 50427, Reinbek 2001.
- XELFER, sprachklanggitter 1995–2001. Essen 2001: Collected poems
- Einzug: Vor allem Chansons aus 2002. Essen 2008
- GEMA Malaise. Public Epistle über die fragwürdige Rechtsfähigkeit eines Vereins - kraft staatlicher Verleihung?. Essen 2009
- Studien zur Entwicklung der Kommerziellen Unterhaltungsmusik. Vienna 2013. (Druck i. V.)

== Compositions ==
- 1952–1959: Indonesische Szenen (piano & Violin), Triptychon für Orgel
- 1960–1972: Polyrhythmika I, II und III (piano), Konkretionen 2 (String quartet), Lyrische Symphonie (1969 1. Preis beim Sinfoniewettbewerb des Bayrischen Rundfunks), Strati für Orchester, Organ Pops, Violencia (violin solo)
- 1972–1976: Konzert für Violine und Orchester, Konkretionen V für Kammermusikensemble, Diri Dana (Folklore cantata for soprano, alto, bass & tenor), Czech songs, Zugstücke for piano
- 1976–2012: Bagatellen (Akkordeon-Orchester), Rumbabagatelle (Klaviertrio), ...und tausend Gedanken bind’ ich (Gesang), Dort im anderen Lande (Chor), ...denn ihr werdet Gott schauen (Orgel), Elegie über das Leiden der Menschen (Orgel), Inseln ünner den Wind (Kantate für Chöre und Orchester), Die Borchert-Lieder, Nachklänge aus Mähren, Nachklänge aus Wien, Ein kurzes Leben (Zyklus Meerbaum-Eisinger), Rilke-Lieder, Erinnerung an Czernowitz f. Orchester, Concentus (Orgel)
