= Fredrik Wildhagen =

Norwegian art historian

- Born: August 15, 1939
- Died: May 9, 1992 (aged 52)
- Occupation: Art historian
- Awards: Medal of St. Hallvard (1978)

Fredrik Christian Wildhagen (August 15, 1939 – May 9, 1992) was a Norwegian art historian, known for having documented Scandinavian art design.

After studying in Rome and Oslo, Fredrik Wildhagen started working at the National School of Art and Design in 1967. During his term as chancellor from 1975 to 1981, the school became a college, and Wildhagen then became both an associate professor and head of the new Department of Theory and History in 1982. From 1981 to 1986, he was the design critic for the newspaper Arbeiderbladet.

== Selected works ==
- Tore Brantenberg, Lauritz Opstad, and Fredrik Wildhagen, eds. (1985). Angelo Mangiarotti, sammenhenger. Oslo: Kunstindustrimuseet i Oslo.
- Fredrik Wildhagen (1987). "The Guzzini Memorandum: From the Ethic of Projects to the Project of Ethics." Design Issues 5(1): 87–92.
- Fredrik Wildhagen (1988). Norge i form: kunsthåndverk og design under industrikulturen. Oslo: J. M. Stenersen.
- Fredrik Wildhagen (1991). Møbeldesigneren Ingmar Relling i perspektiv. Sykkylven: Sykkylven Næringsutvikling.

== Positions ==
- Member of the Nordic Forum of Design History
- Founder and chairman of the Norwegian Forum council
- Member of the Ministry of Foreign Affairs' advisory group for the Norwegian Pavilion at the World Exhibition in Seville in 1992
- Vice president of the National Association of Norwegian Applied Arts
- Board member of the Art Industry Museum
- Member of Italian design juries
- Consulting editor for the Journal of Design History (Oxford), Design Issues (Chicago), and Scandinavian Journal of Design History

== Awards ==
- 1978: Medal of St. Hallvard
