= Associazione per il Disegno Industriale =

Italian industrial design association

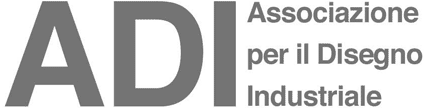

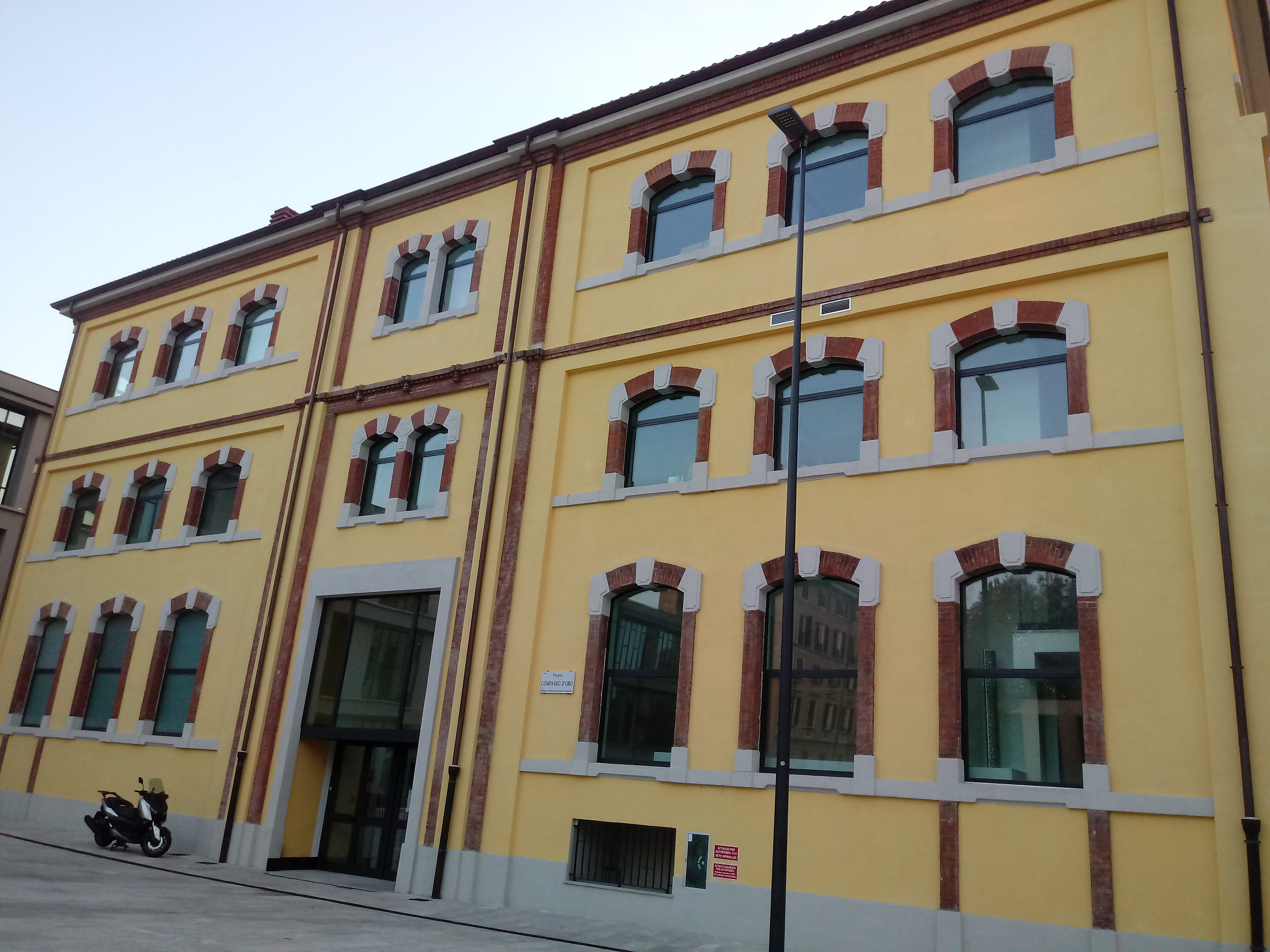
- Interactive fullscreen map
- Founded at: Milan, Italy
- Type: Professional assosciation
- Headquarters: Piazza Compasso d'Oro, 1
- Location: Milan, Italy
- Coordinates: 45°29′00″N 9°10′49″E
- Region served: Lombardy
- Products: ADI Design Index; ADI Permanent Design Observatory
- Services: Promotion of good design
- Members: c. 1,100
- Subsidiaries: ADI Foundation; ADI Design Museum; ADI Compasso d'Oro
- Website: adi-design.org

Associazione per il Disegno Industriale 'Industrial Design Association' (ADI), is an Italian professional organisation of about 1,100 architects, designers, manufacturers, trade journalists, academics, and design universities. Its primary purpose is the promotion of good design in Italy and abroad. The ADI is responsible for the administration of the Compasso d'Oro design awards and an associated museum.

== History and purpose ==
The ADI was founded in 1956 in Milan by a group of prominent architects, designers, and industrialists including Gio Ponti, Alberto Rosselli, Giulio Castelli, and Livio Castiglioni (who, respectively, served as the first three presidents of the organisation).

The objective of the ADI is to promote and enhance the understanding of and impact of high-quality Italian and international design as an industrial, economic, and cultural phenomenon.

The biennial Compasso d'Oro award, considered to be the most prestigious industry accolade, is granted by the ADI. A collection of Compasso d'Oro winning designs and other material related to the history and practice of design in Italy and abroad is held by the ADI Design Museum in Milan.
