= Gianfranco Frattini =

Italian architect and designer (1926–2004)

- Born: 15 May 1926
- Died: 6 April 2004, 6 April 2001
- Occupations: Architect, designer
- Children: Emanuela Frattini Magnusson
- Website: gianfrancofrattini.com

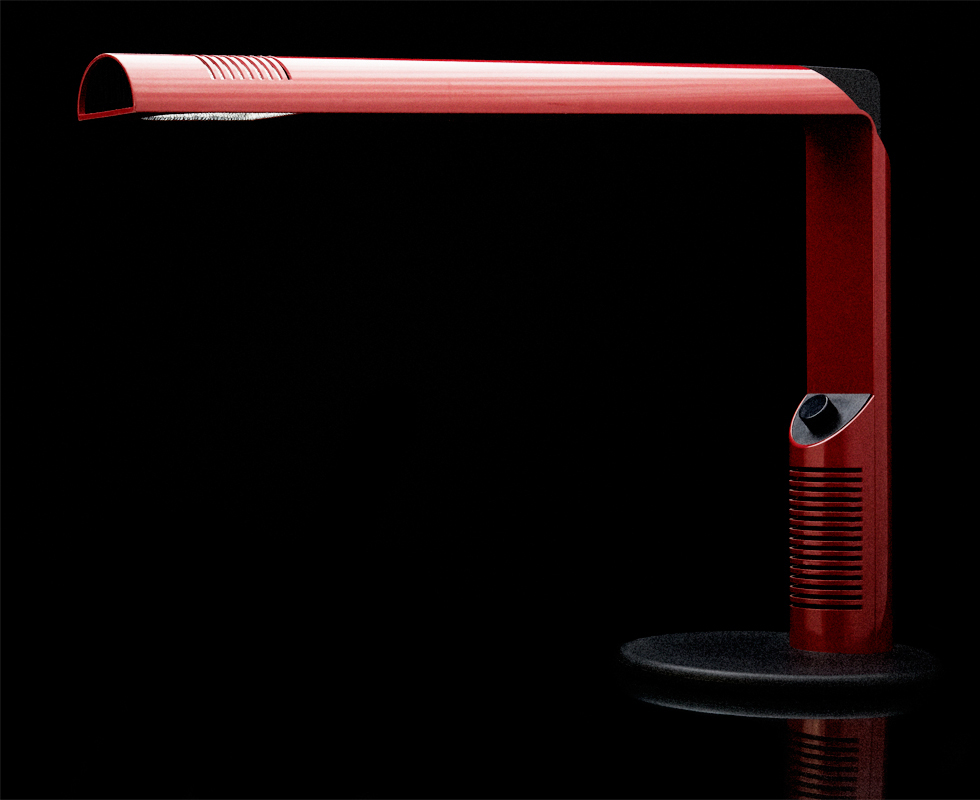
Abele desk lamp designed for Luci (1979)

Gianfranco Frattini (May 15, 1926 – April 6, 2004) was an Italian architect and designer. He is a member of the generation that created the Italian design movement in the late 1950s through the 1960s and is considered to have played a major role in shaping it.

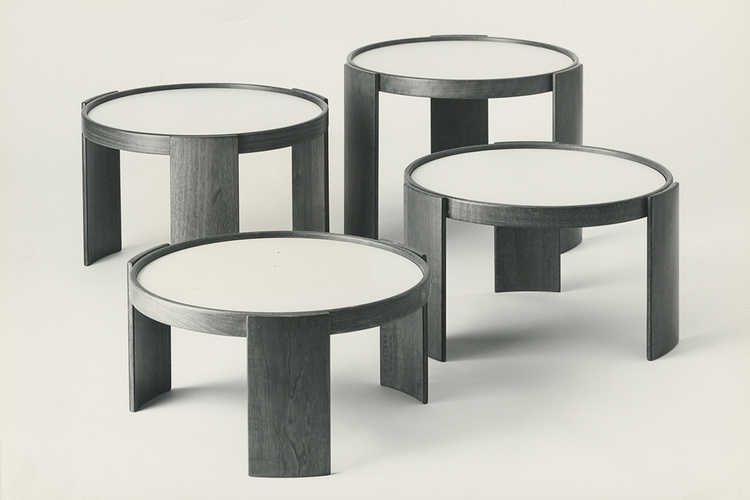
Nesting tables designed for Cassina (1966)

== Early life and education ==
Gianfranco Frattini was born in Padua, Italy on May 15, 1926. He graduated with a degree in architecture from the Politecnico di Milano in 1953.

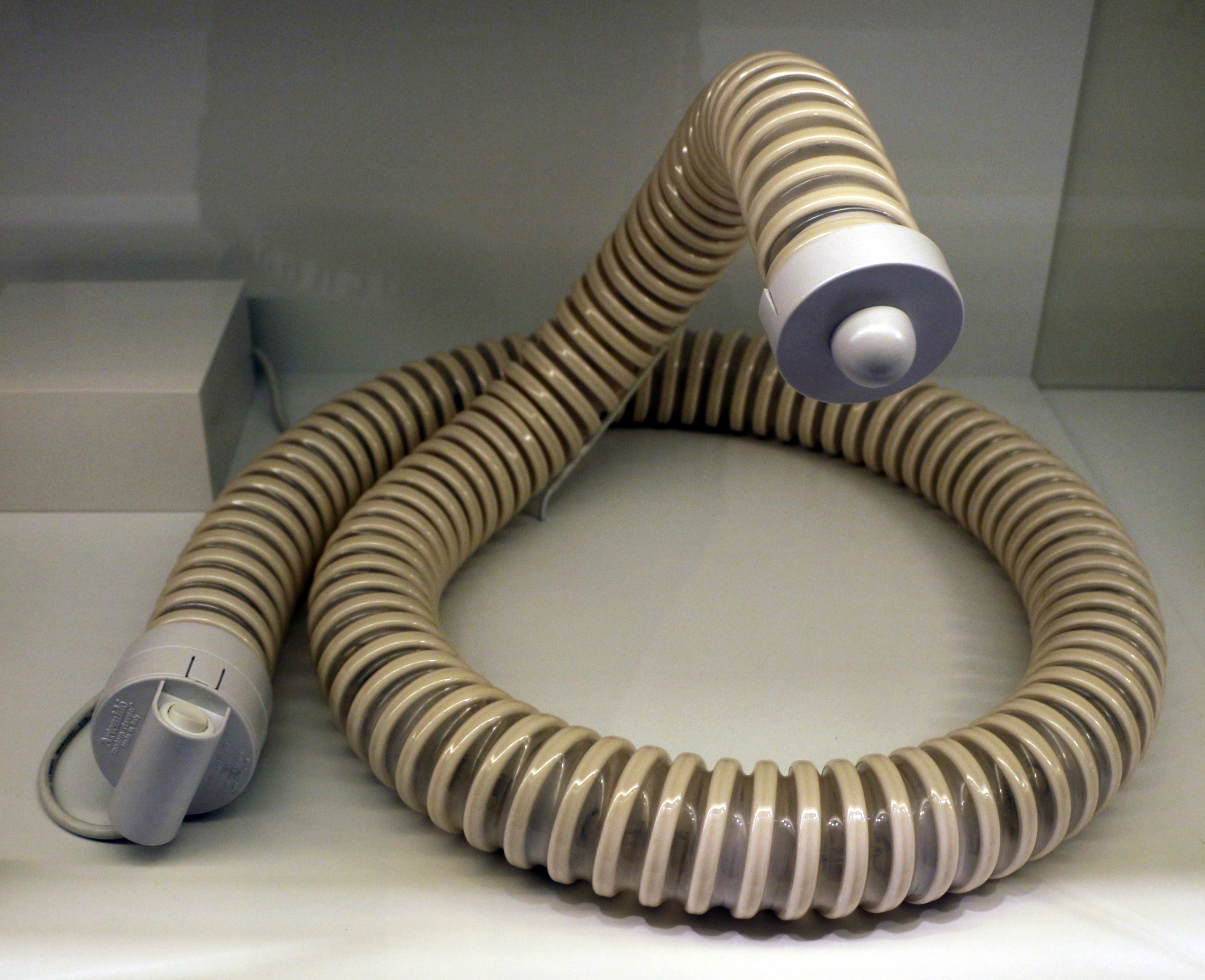
Boalum lighting designed for Artemide in 1969–70 (with Livio Castiglioni)

== Work and career ==
Frattini opened his own professional practice in Milan, after having worked in the office of his teacher and mentor Giò Ponti. Frattini became an industrial designer by default when he lacked appropriate lighting and furniture for his interiors. His collaboration with Cesare Cassina for his namesake company started in 1954, followed by collaborations with many other manufacturers, such as Bernini, Arteluce, Acerbis, Fantoni, Artemide (for whom among others pieces with Livio Castiglioni he designed the historic Boalum lamp), Luci, Knoll, Lema and many others. In 1956 he co-founded Associazione per il Disegno Industriale and throughout his career he practiced both industrial design and architecture, focusing mostly on interiors. His residential commissions included numerous private apartments and palazzos, stores, and offices.

His international commissions took him to Dusseldorf and Luxembourg, where he designed the interiors of the luxury stores, and Tokyo, where he designed the interior public spaces of the Tokyo Hilton.

Frattini was a board member of the Triennale. He maintained a long-term professional partnership with the master craftsman Pierluigi Ghianda of Bovisio-Masciago. Glassware designed by Gianfranco Frattini for Progetti is in the permanent collection of the Museum of Modern Art and the Boalum lamp (with Livio Castiglioni) produced by Artemide is in the collection of the Smithsonian, Cooper-Hewitt National Design Museum.

== Gallery of works ==
Hotel Europa Palace (Anacapri). Photos by Paolo Monti, 1963

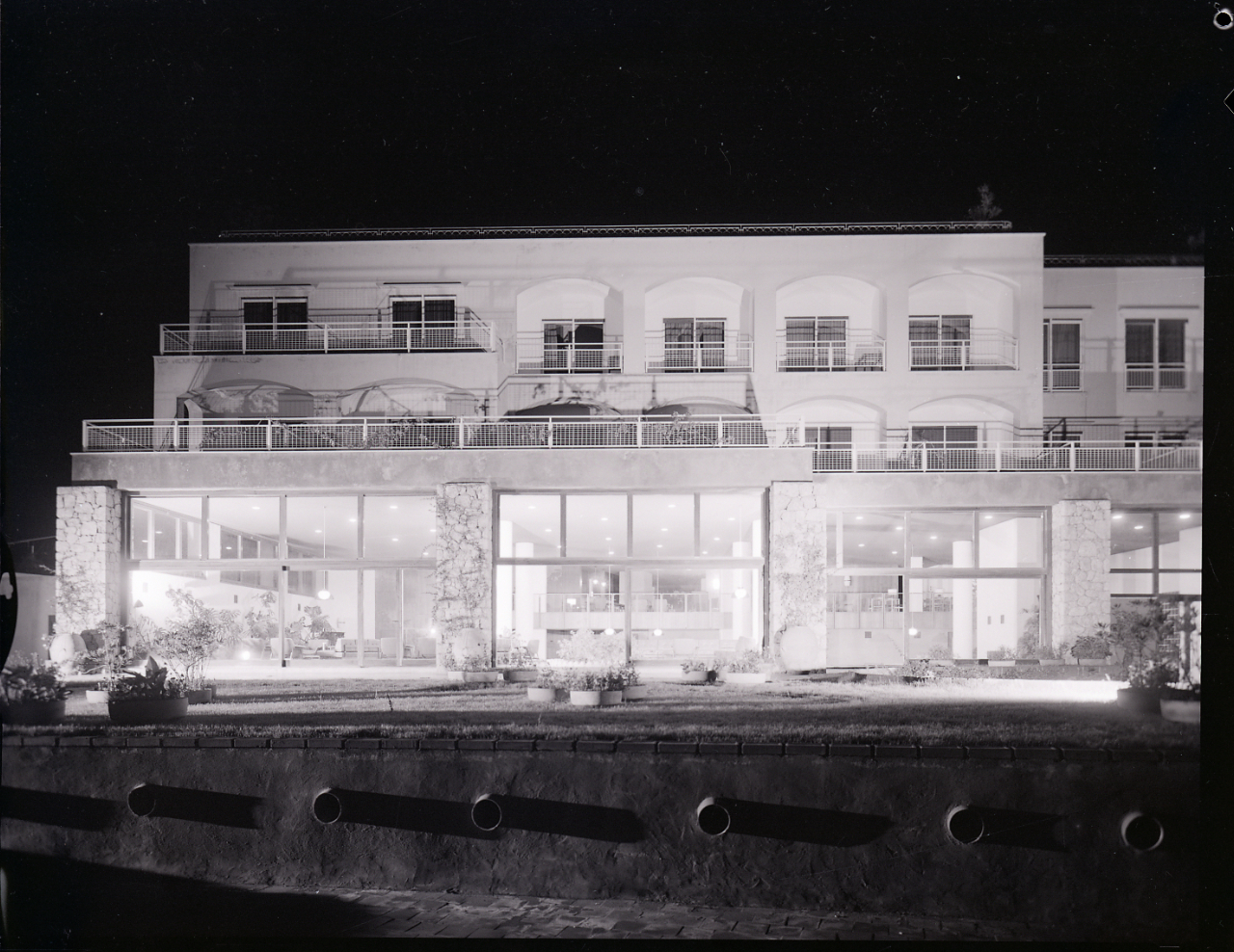
Hotel Europa Palace

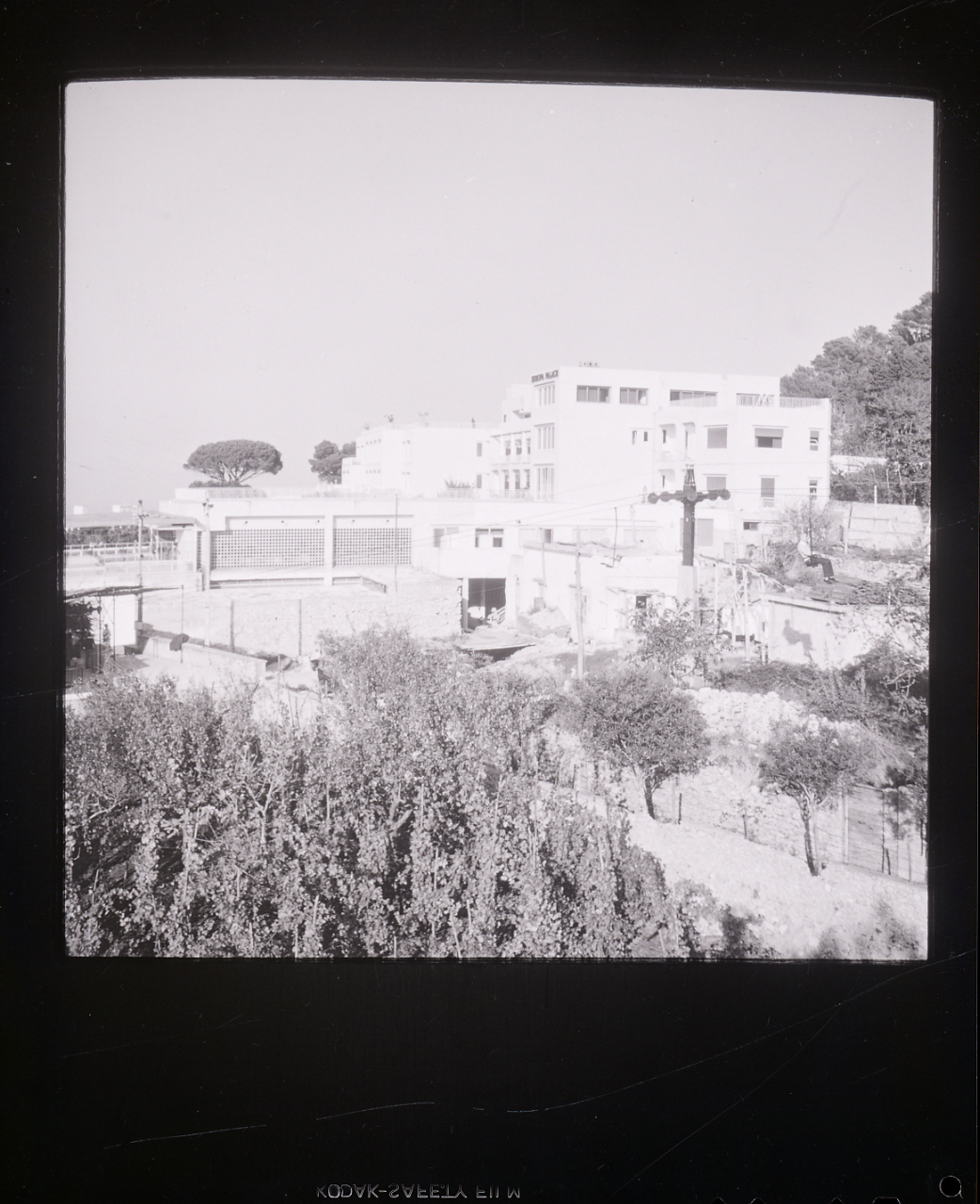
Exterior

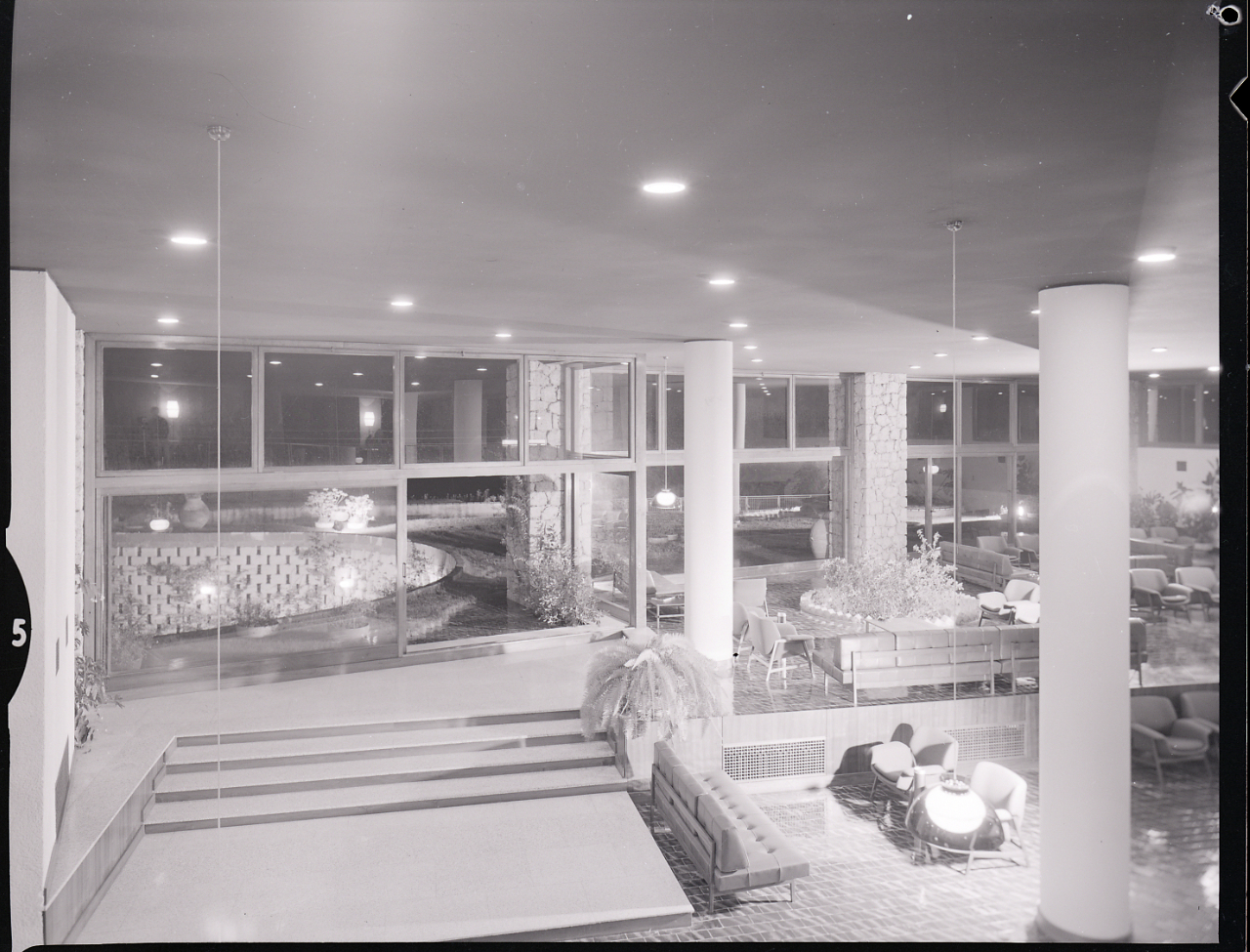
Atrium, reception, pianobar

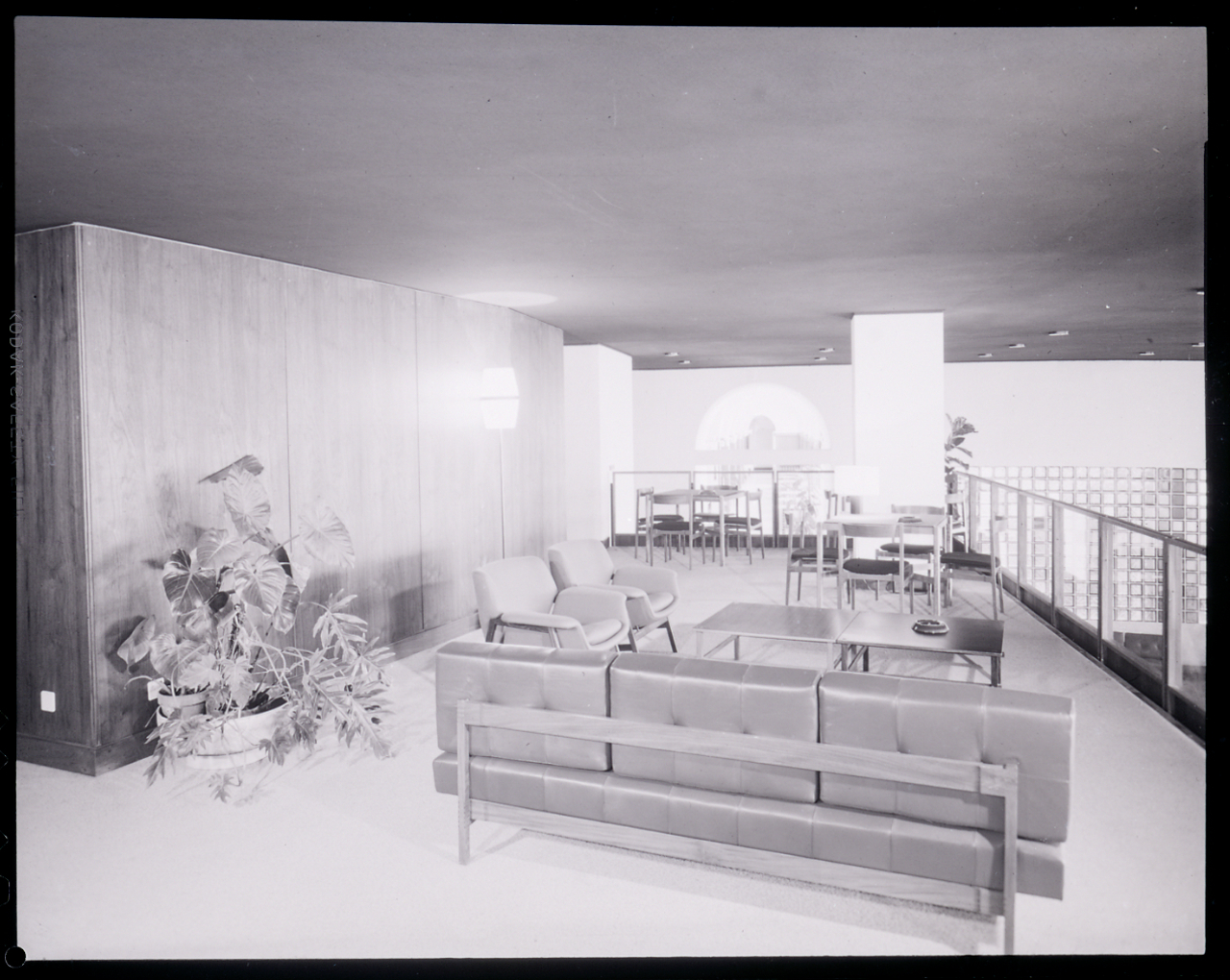
Mezzanine floor

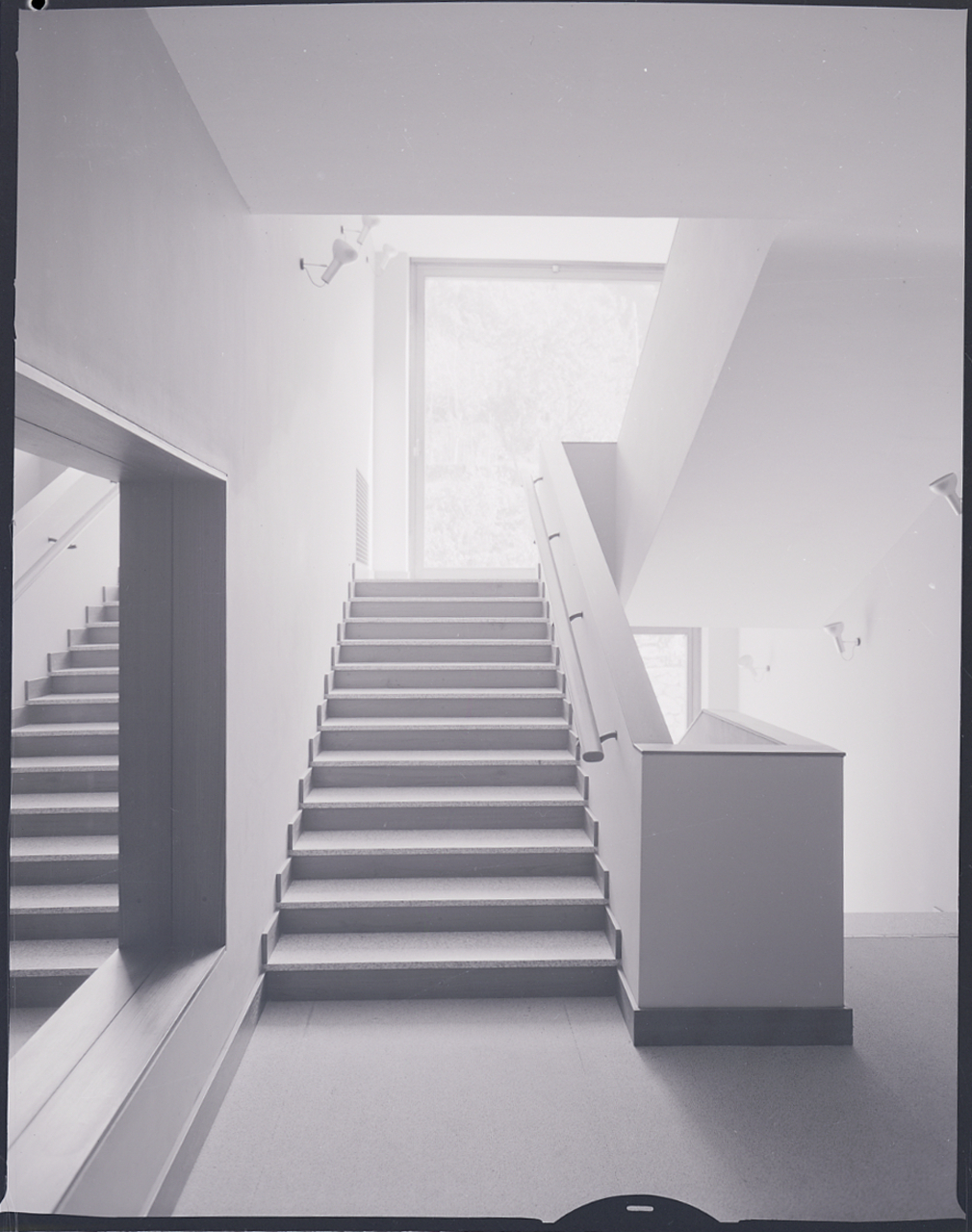
Stairs

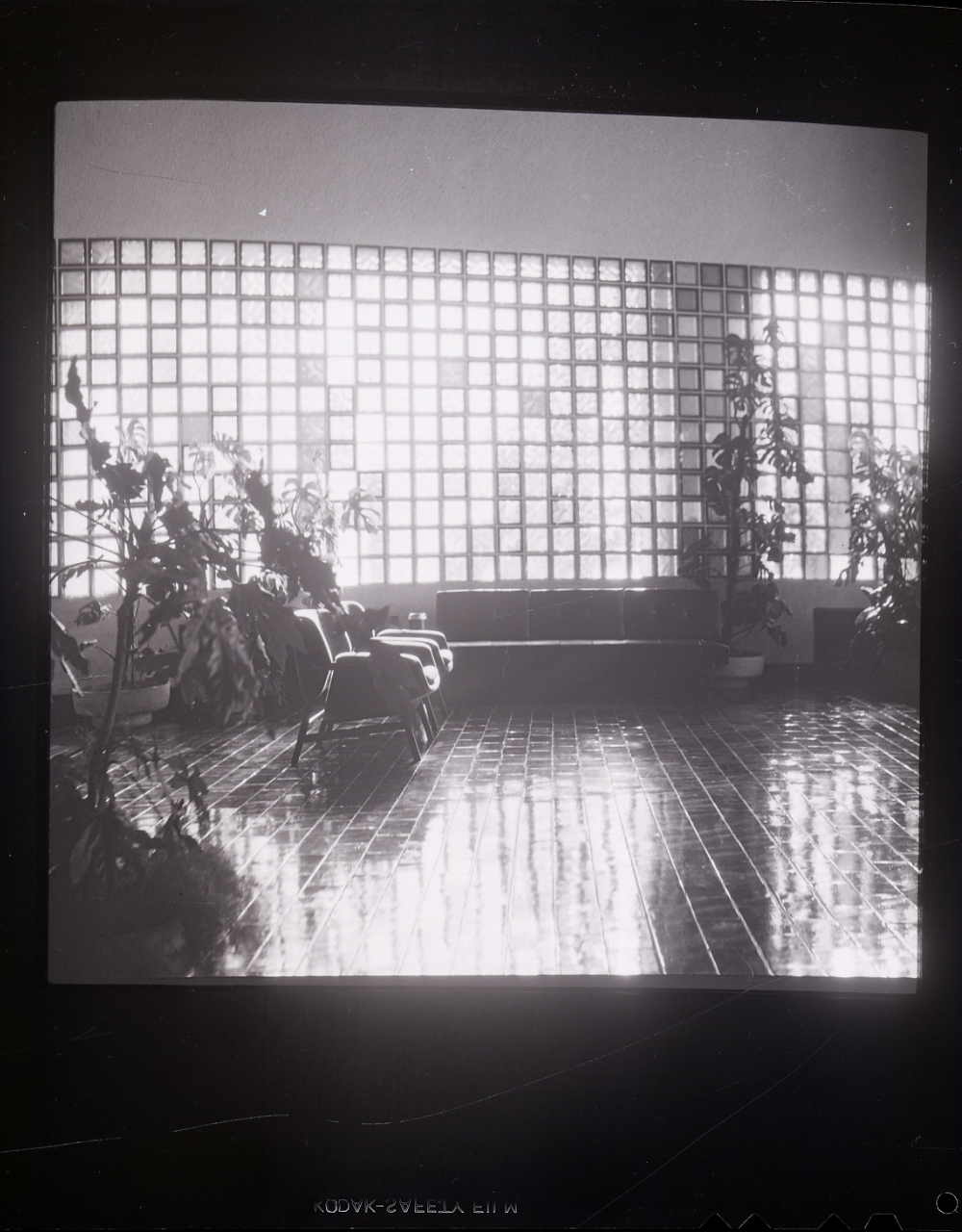
Interior
Furniture and product designs by Gianfranco Frattini. Photos courtesy of Gianfranco Frattini Studio.

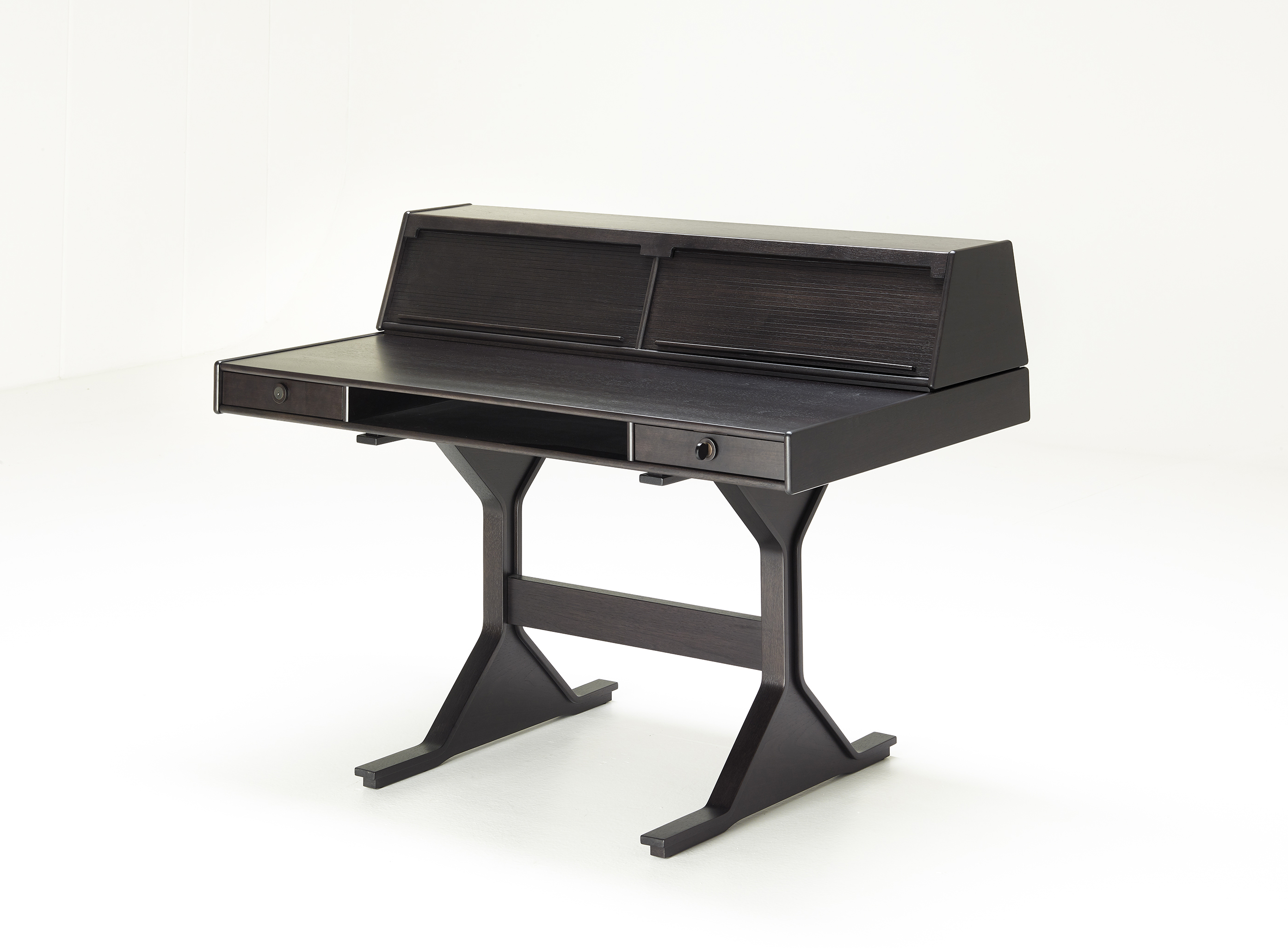
Nòs desk for Bernini/Ceccotti (1957)

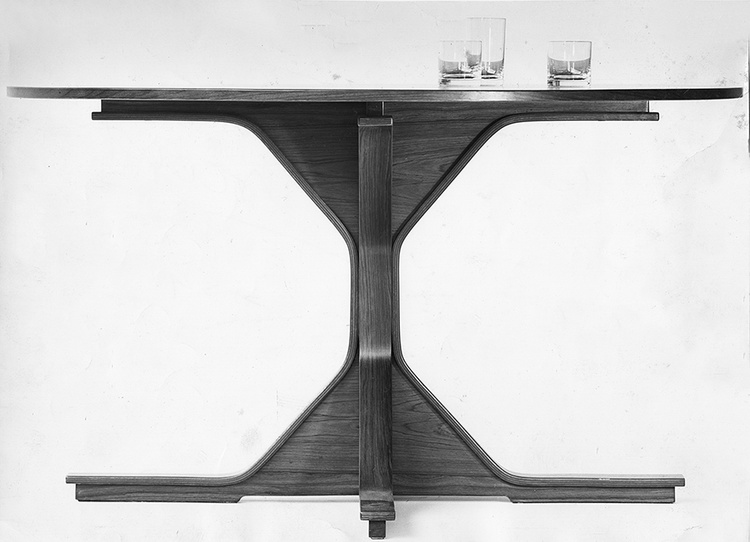
Rosewood circular table designed for Bernini in (1960)

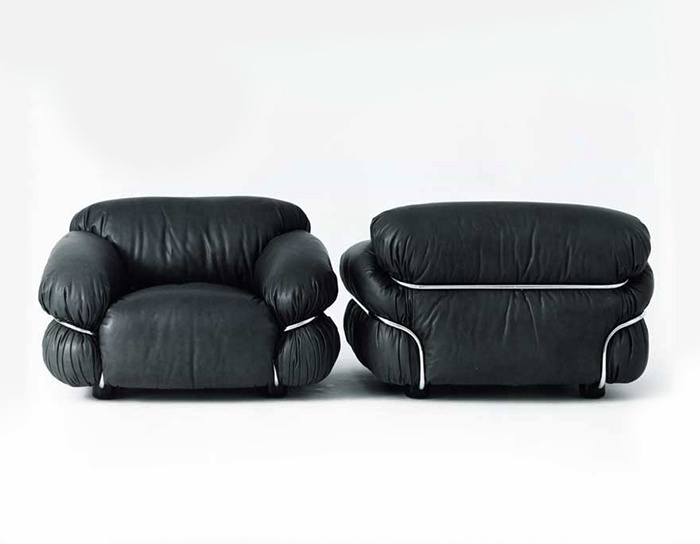
Sesann lounge collection, designed for Cassina, 1970. Reintro- duced by Tacchini in 2015.

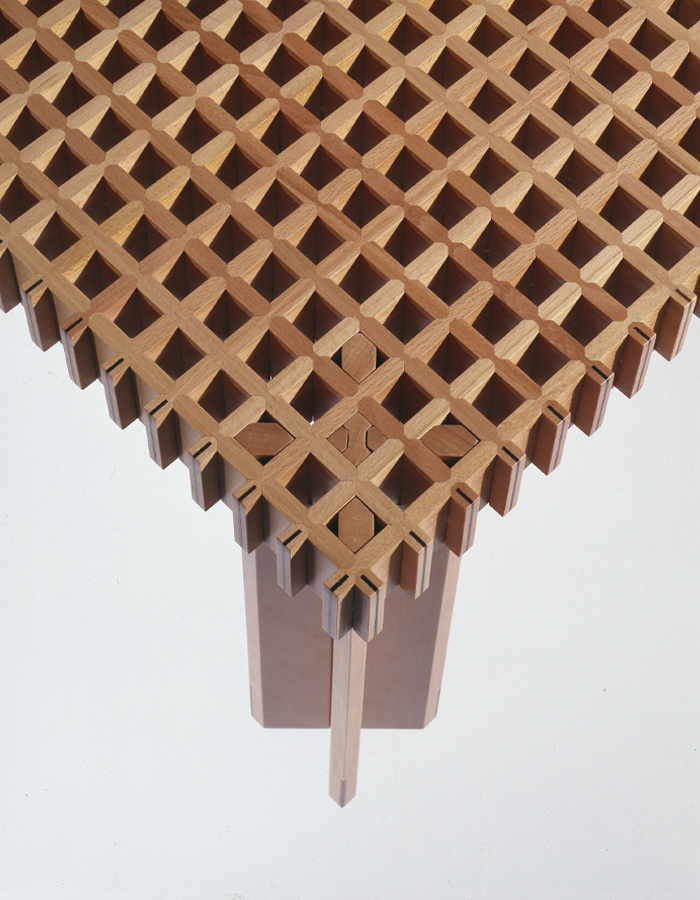
Leg connection detail of Frattini's Kyoto Table, designed in 1974 for Pierluigi Ghianda. Part of the permanent collection of the Triennale Design Museum. Currently produced by Poltrona Frau.

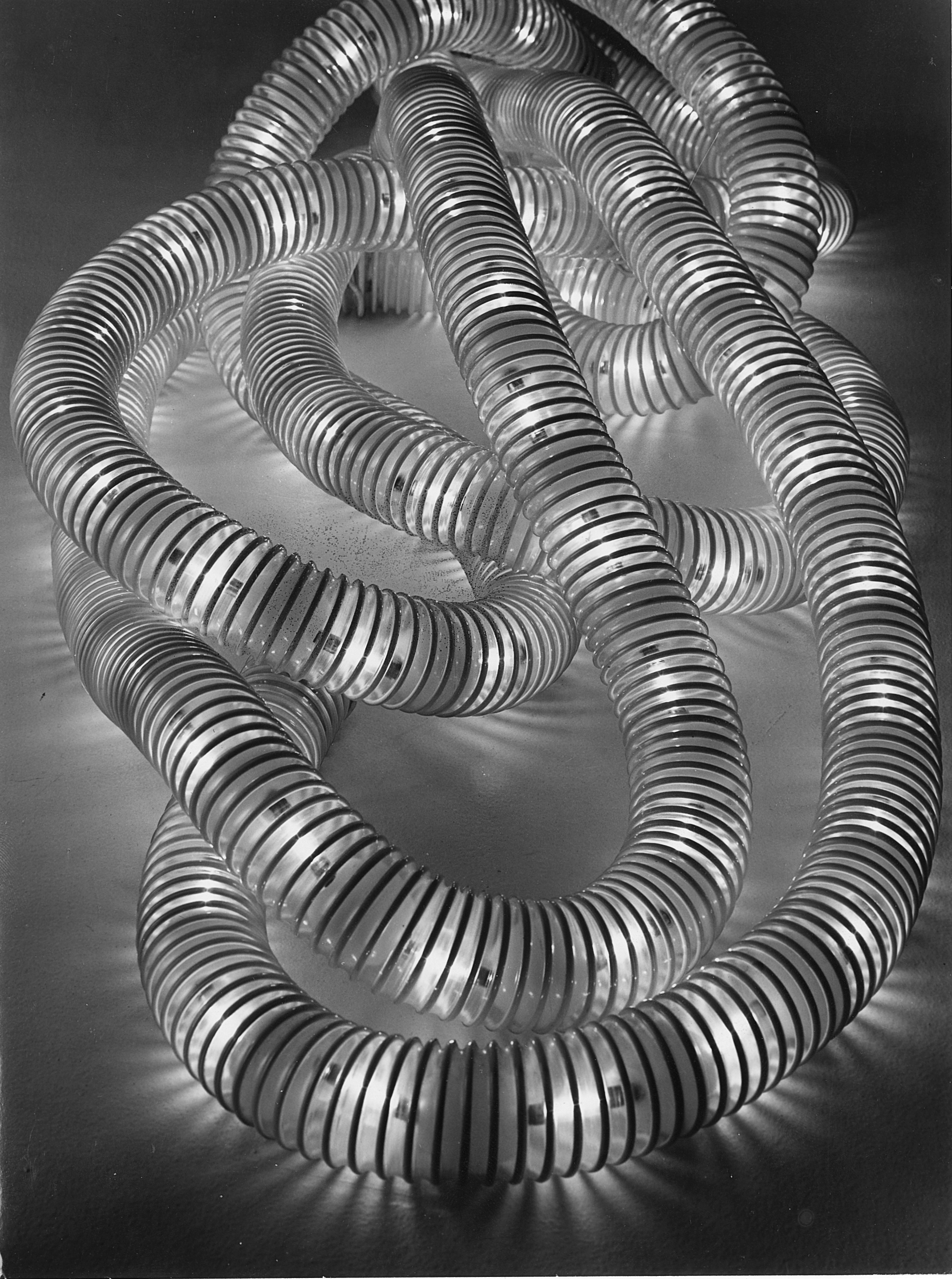
Boalum, flexible lighting, designed with Livio Castiglioni, 1970 for Artemide, still in production. Part of the MoMA's permanent collection.

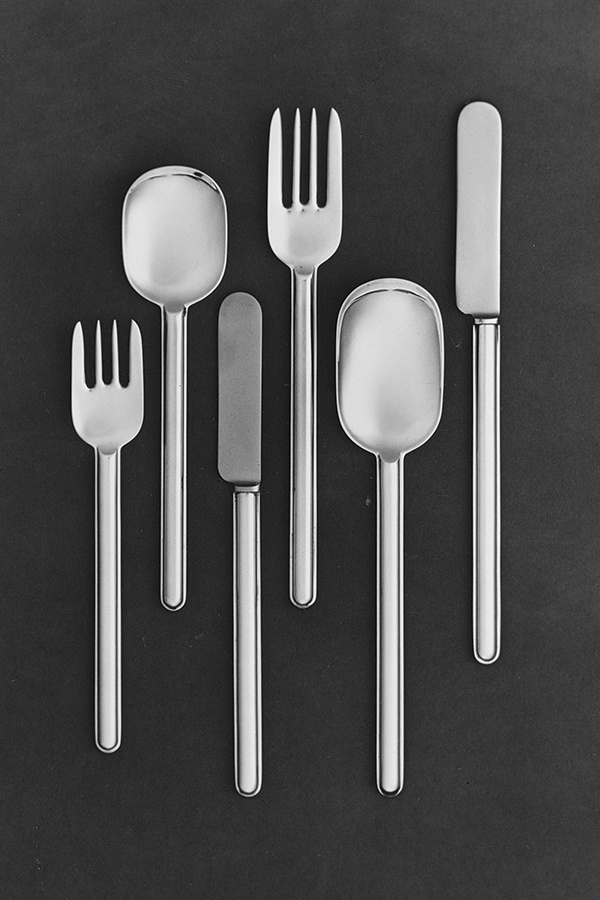
Silver flatware designed for Argenteria Ricci in 1971. Reintroduced by CB2 in 2022.

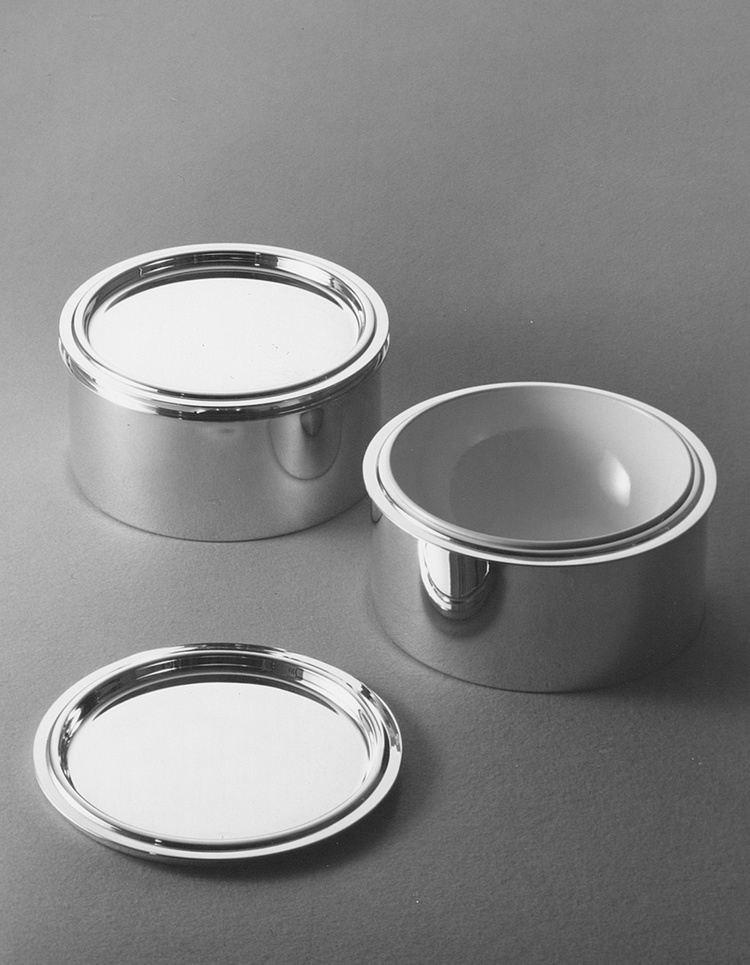
Silver dinnerware with removable, enameled interiors designed for Argenteria Ricci, 1973.

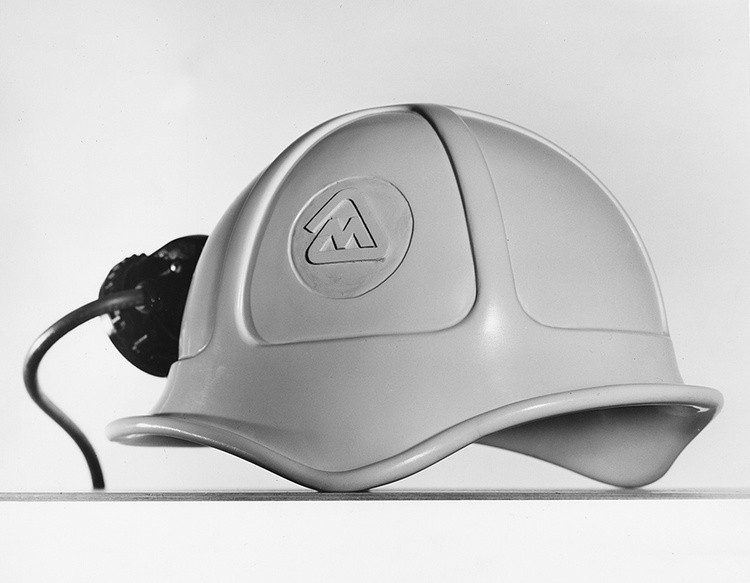
Hard hat designed for Montecatini (1973). Part of the permanent collection of the Triennale Design Museum.

=== Death and afterward ===
Gianfranco Frattini died in Milan, Italy on April 6, 2004.

== Awards and honours ==
Frattini won many professional awards and prizes, among them the prestigious Compasso d'Oro.
