= Lampette =

Brand of desk lamp

- Product type: Small high-intensity and low-voltage desk lamp
- Produced by: Koch Creations
- Country: Worldwide
- Introduced: c. 1963; 63 years ago
- Discontinued: c. 1970; 56 years ago
- Markets: United States
- Registered as a trademark in: United States 1963

The Lampette was a brand of small electric high-intensity telescoping desk lamps that was designed and distributed by Koch Creations but manufactured by various subcontractors from the early 1960s to the late 1980s.

== History ==
According to an article published in the June 1965 issue of the Kiplinger's Personal Finance magazine, smaller high-intensity lamps for personal use only came to the market in 1963, after a "professional work light", invented in 1959 by Jay Monroe and then manufactured by Monroe's Tensor Corporation in 1960. The work light was marketed as the "Tensor lamp", and was initially sold to jewelers, watchmakers, and other similar craftsmen. Due to Monroe's and Tensor's success in selling their original type of small high-intensity lamps, other companies began to design and sell similar types of lamps to the general public by 1963.

One of the primary competitors of the "Tensor Lamp" throughout the 60s was the Koch Creations "Lampette", which had a similar design and function. They were compared often by consumers, as seen in Kiplinger's Personal Finance, which discusses the measure of brightness relative to the price of high intensity lamps. It states that a $19.95 Lampette model had a less impressive range of brightness in its extended and folded positions, and gave generally less light (than the compared Tensor Model 5975, priced at a range of $17.50 to $22.95). In 1964, The New York Times considered the Lampette as "the best designed version sold today" when comparing all small desk lamps available at that time, including those sold by Tensor, Mobilette, Stiffel, and Lightolier.

The miniature 12-volt DC automotive-type #93 lightbulb utilized by Tensor, Lampette, and other designers of similar products, are smaller than the standard household 110/220-volt AC incandescent light bulb but produced more lumens in a smaller area, so that the lamp bulbs burn out at an increased rate. While standard bulbs last around 1,000 hours, the miniature bulbs used in these lamps last on average between 250 and 600 hours. There were issues with the shades getting hot to the touch, alongside electrical hazards, etc. This was why safety became a talking point regarding high-intensity lamps.

The Lampette's specifications varied from designer, and many differed visually and internally. Many different renditions and models of the Lampette were sold over the years, and this is seen in the wide variety of Lampette models that can be found for sale today, though most have a generally similar appearance.

A model E6 Lampette Reading Lamp, made 1963, is displayed at the Museum of Modern Art, along with specifications. The model is made of plastic and metal, with dimensions of 16 in × 3.25 in (40.6 cm × 8.3 cm) when extended, and 6 in × 3.25 in (15.2 cm × 8.3 cm) when folded.

Lampette models utilized built-in transformers which convert standard household 110/220-volt AC obtained through wall plugs to 12-volt DC to light the bulb.

== See also ==
- Balanced-arm lamp
- Banker's lamp
- Tensor lamp
- Tiffany lamp
- Tizio
- Tolomeo desk lamp
