= Tizio =

Counterweight-balanced table lamp

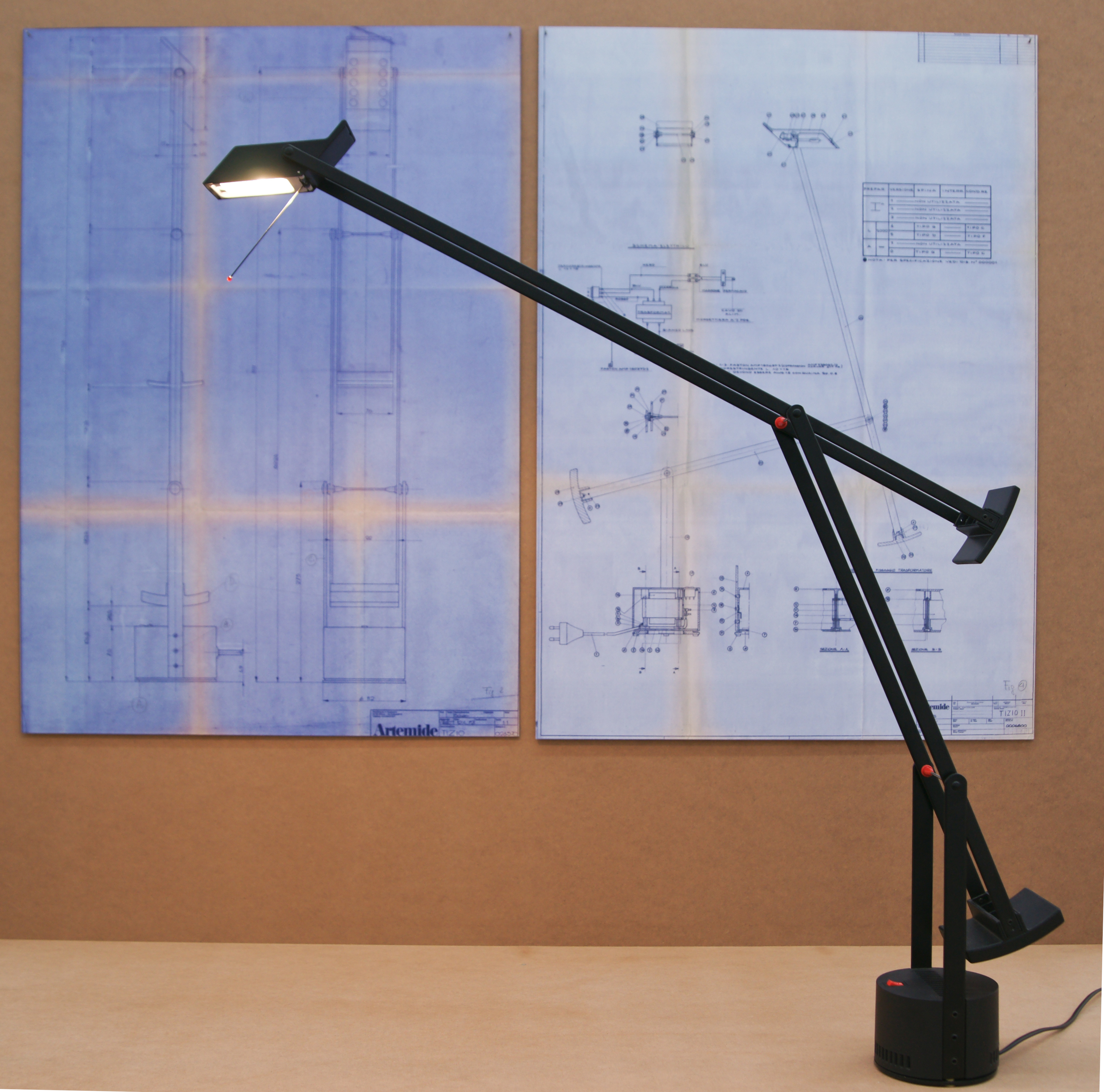
A Tizio desk lamp

Tizio is a desk lamp created by Richard Sapper for Artemide in 1972. It was selected for the Compasso d'Oro industrial design award in 1979. The lamp is in the collections of the Metropolitan Museum of Art and Museum of Modern Art.

The position and the direction of the bulb can be adjusted; thanks to two counterweights, moving it requires little effort. There are no wires between the base and the lamp: the two parallel arms, connected with snap fasteners, conduct safe 12-volt electricity. The bulb is halogen, which was previously mainly used in the automotive industry.

The Tizio is available in a variety of sizes and colours; the original, and most widely known, is the 50 (referring to the wattage of the bulb) in black. The mid-sized model is the 35, and there is the bedside-sized Micro (20 Watts). Other colours are white, and grey metallic; and, the occasional limited edition in polished aluminium, or titanium-colour. There also is a floorstanding version, the Terra, which consist of a 70-centimeter-high pedestal with the same 11 cm diameter as the lamp's base, with the 50 added on top. The Terra-stand is also available in a 10 cm diameter, matching the 35 model. In 2007, an energy-saving LED-powered version of the full-sized model has been added; as has a version of the regular 50 with a horizontally rotatable head, the Plus. The LED and Plus versions are equipped with a dimmer; all other versions have a three-position switch, allowing for off, full, and – approximately – half power.

Design changes were made to the head in the nineties – a glass cover, and a thin wire terminating in a small red bead were added.

The name Tizio was given by Ernesto Gismondi, the founder of Artemide, and alludes to Tizio, Caio e Sempronio, the Italian equivalent of Tom, Dick and Harry. One explanation for the name is that Gismondi hoped to appeal to everyone; another is that Gismondi hoped to convince Sapper to create Caio and Sempronio designs as well.

== Bibliography ==
- Volker Fischer, Hans Höger. The Tizio-Light by Richard Sapper. Art Books International Limited 1997 ISBN 3931317420

== See also ==
- Balanced-arm lamp
- Lampette
- Tensor lamp
- Tolomeo desk lamp, sometimes considered its successor
