= Livio Castiglioni =

Italian architect and designer (1911–1979)

- Born: 16 January 1911; Milan, Kingdom of Italy
- Died: 30 April 1979 (aged 68); Milan, Italy
- Education: Politecnico di Milano
- Known for: Architecture; Design

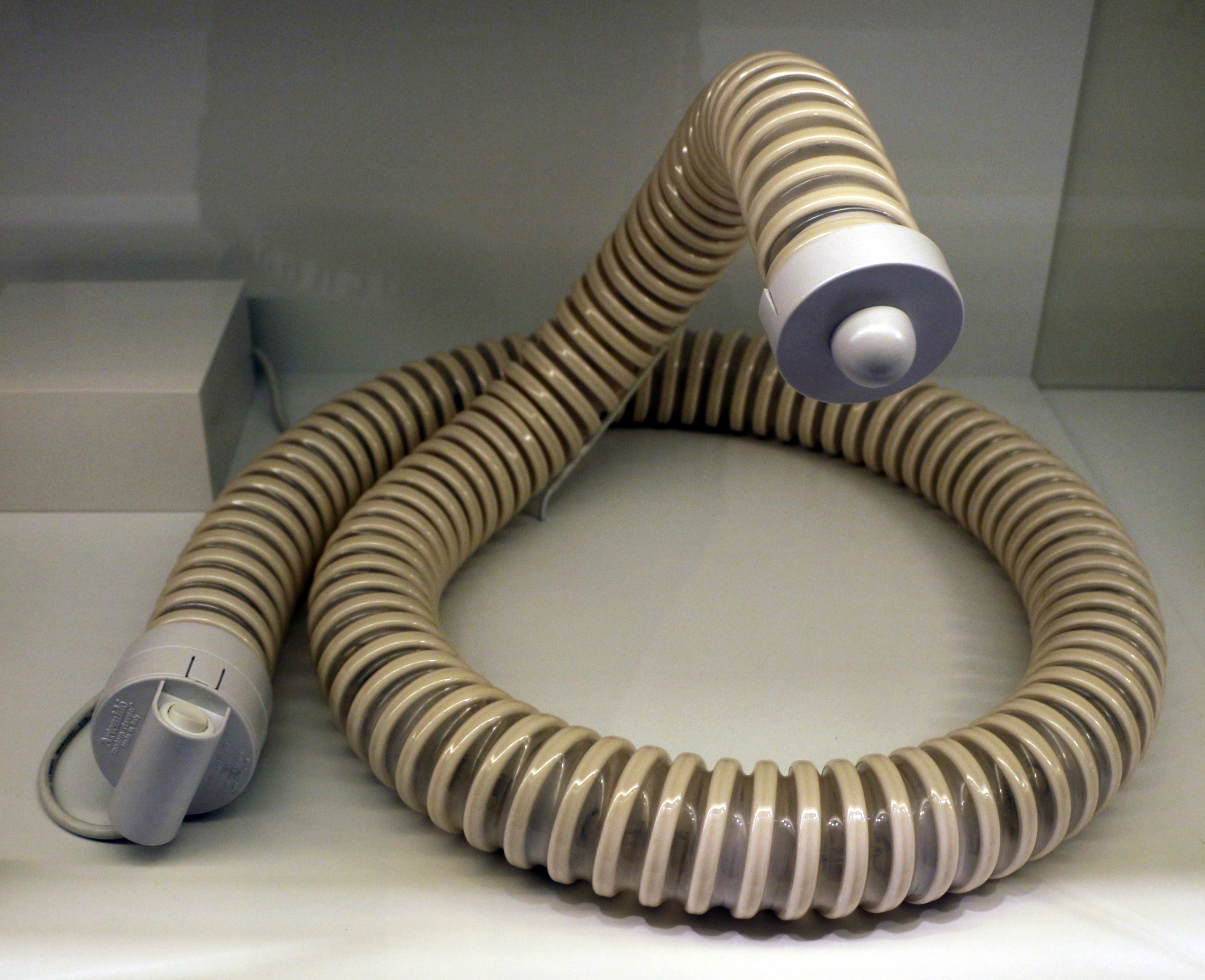
Boalum lamp designed for Artemide in 1969–1970 (with Gianfranco Frattini)

Livio Castiglioni (16 January 1911 – 30 April 1979) was an Italian architect and designer. He made a significant contribution to twentieth-century Italian lighting design and was an early proponent of the practice of industrial design in Italy.

== Early life and education ==
Livio Castiglioni was born in Milan on 16 January 1911. He was the son of Livia Bolla and the sculptor Giannino Castiglioni, and the elder brother of the architects Achille and Pier Giacomo Castiglioni.

He received a degree in architecture from the Polytechnic University of Milan in 1936, and subsequently went into practice with his brother Pier Giacomo and Luigi Caccia Dominioni. After the Second World War the youngest Castiglioni brother, Achille, joined their architecture and design studio; in the mid-1950s Livio left to establish his own design practice.

== Work and career ==
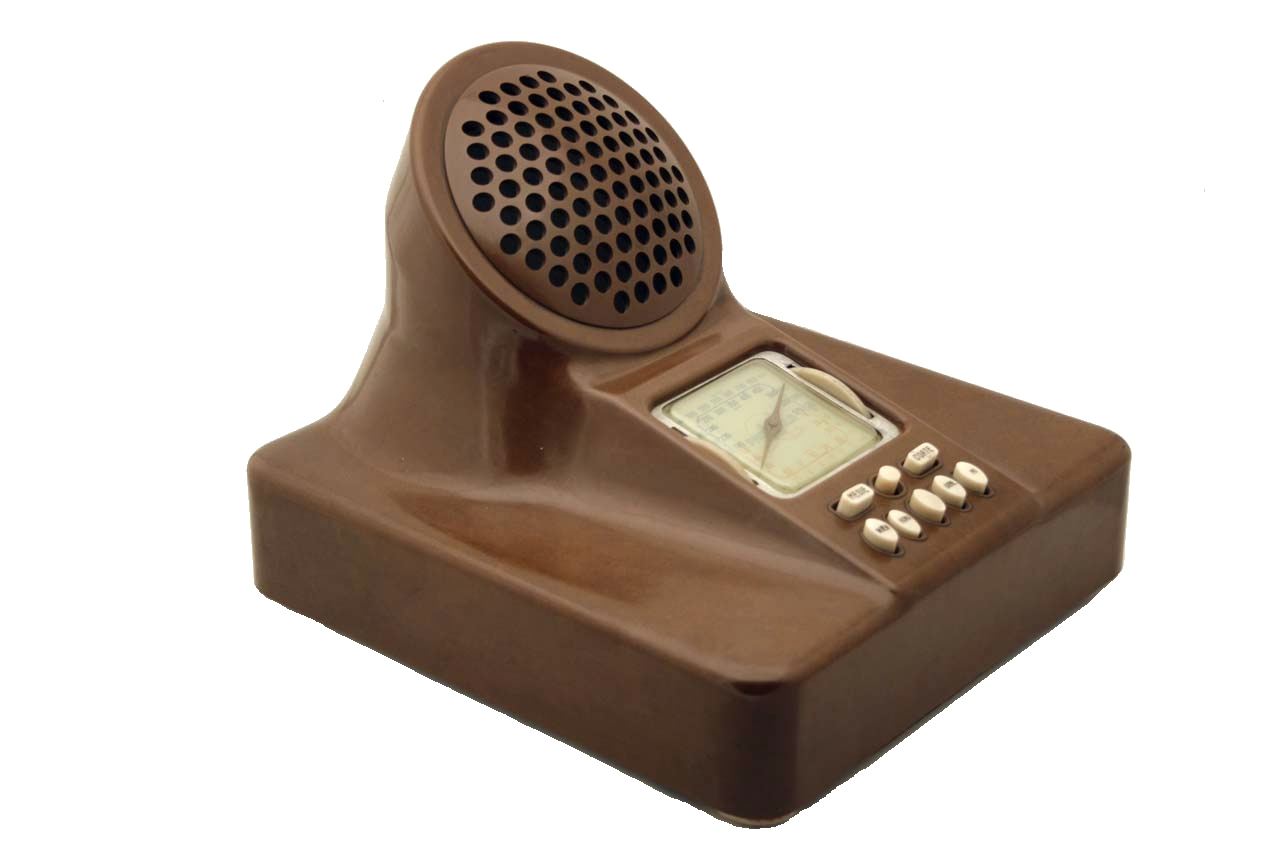
Tabletop radio designed for Phonola SA in 1939 (with Luigi Caccia Dominioni and Pier Giacomo Castiglioni)

Much of the early work of the Castiglioni brothers was in exhibition design, although they also carried out a number of architectural projects, including the reconstruction in 1952–1953 of the Palazzo della Permanente in Milan, which had been destroyed by Allied bombing in 1943.

Livio Castiglioni designed products for companies such as Alessi, Artemide, FontanaArte, and Stilnovo. One of his first works of industrial design was the 1939 "F.I.M.I. – Phonola 547" tabletop radio, which is amongst the earliest examples of this product typology to challenge traditional shapes and aesthetics, making it a turning point in the history of Italian industrial design. He was a consultant to Phonola until 1956, and then for Brionvega from 1960 to 1964.

In 1969–1970 he and Gianfranco Frattini designed the "Boalum" light for Artemide (the name combines "Boa" and "lum" from "lume", an Italian word for light). The design was still in production in 2023, over fifty years after it was first manufactured.

Castiglioni was one of the founding members of the Associazione per il Disegno Industriale in Milan and was its president in 1959–1960. He is also credited as being one of the originators of the Compasso d'Oro award.

Working as a lighting designer throughout the 1960s and 1970s Castiglioni collaborated with many of his contemporaries such as the architects Gae Aulenti, Cini Boeri, Cesare Maria Casati and Roberto Menghi, as well as his son Piero.

== Legacy ==
Castiglioni died in Milan on 30 April 1979, and is buried in the cemetery of Chiaravalle.

Examples of his work are held in the collection of museums such as the National Science and Technology Museum and ADI Design Museum in Milan, the Pompidou Centre in Paris, the Boijmans Museum in Rotterdam, the Saint Louis Art Museum in St. Louis, Missouri, as well as the Museum of Modern Art and the Metropolitan Museum of Art in New York.

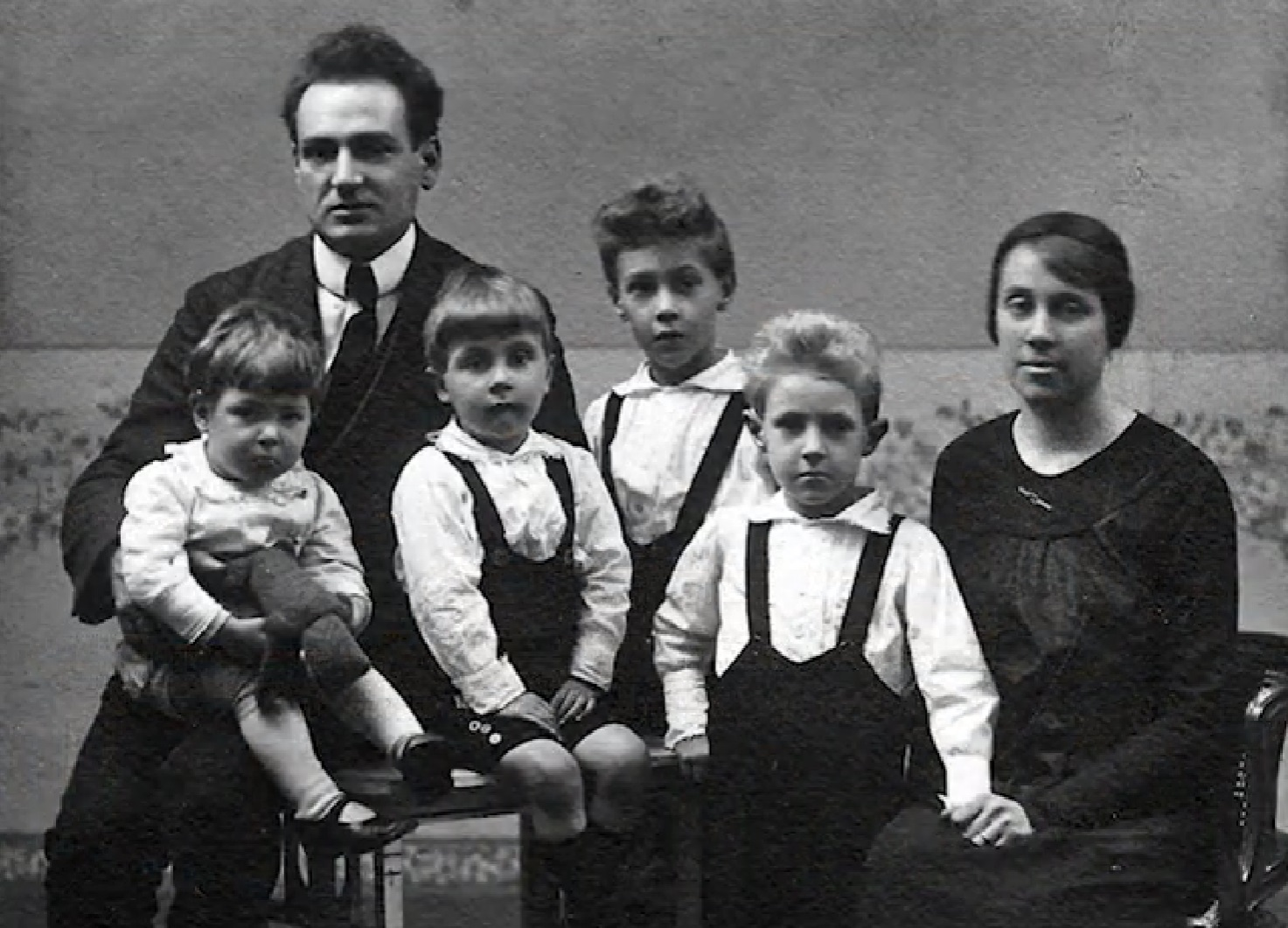
Castiglioni family portrait with brothers Achille, Livio (centre), and Pier Giacomo (1922)

Reflecting on his friendship with the Castiglionis, the designer Massimo Vignelli said:

In reality, the Castiglioni brothers were one person. Symbiosis of thought, creative ability, inspiration and execution were an integral part of their being. Talking to one of them or all three of them was the same, they were completely interchangeable, same voice, same accent, same grin, same laughter, same gestures. They were the Castiglioni, like their work, indivisible fruit of the same research, of the same passion, of a great ability to transform the world around us into a new memorable gesture.

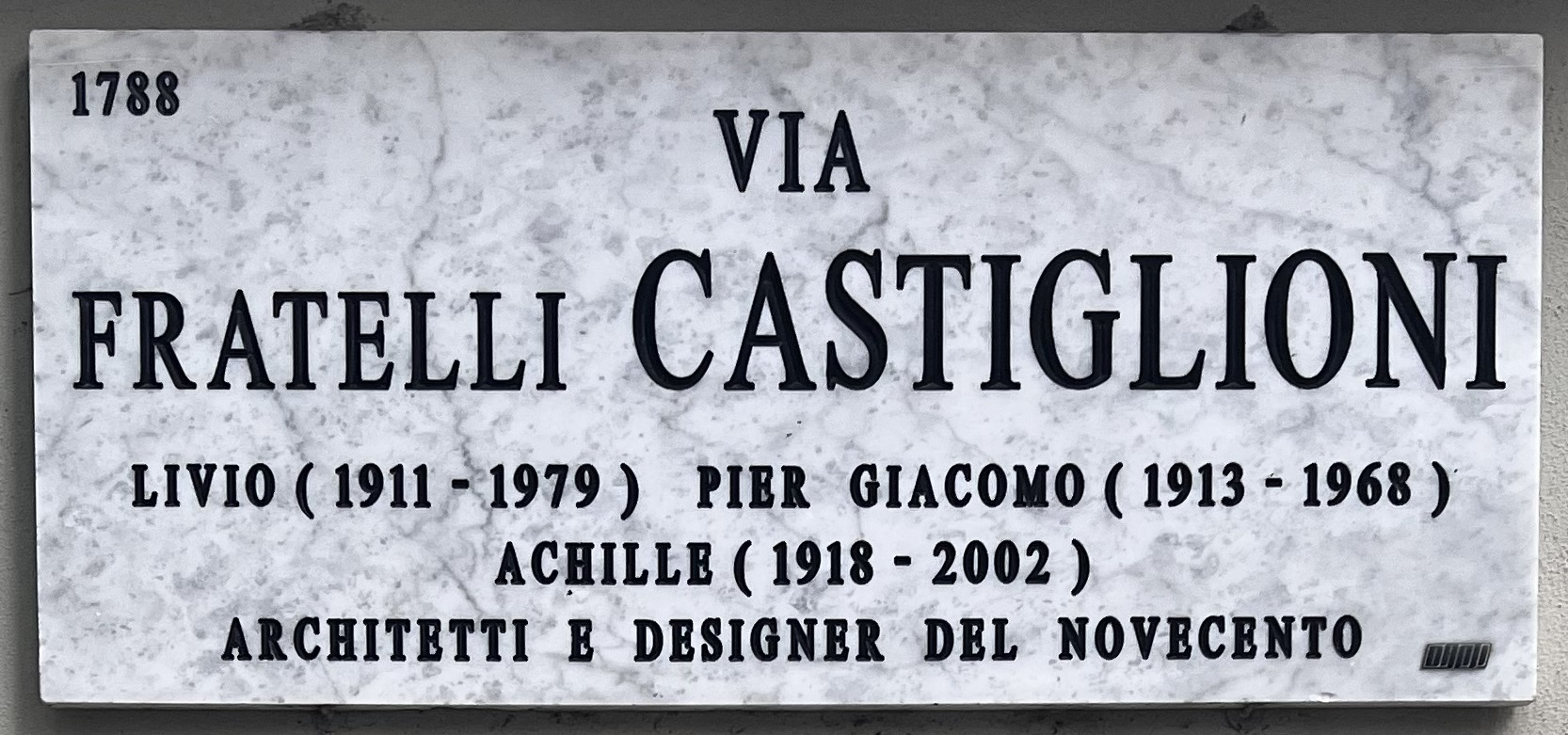

In 2014 the city of Milan named a street Via Fratelli Castiglioni in honour of the three Castiglioni brothers.

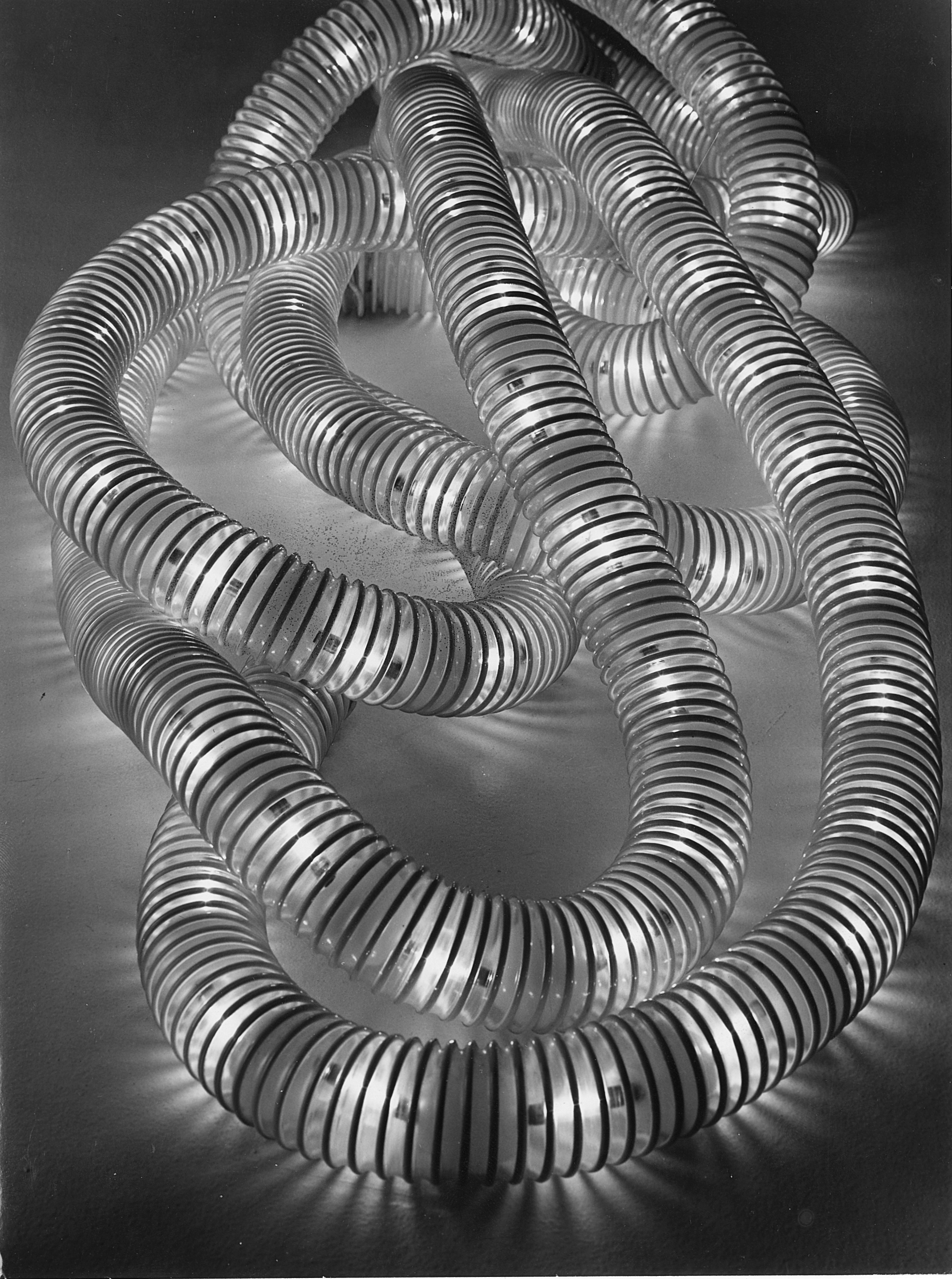
Boalum lighting (illuminated)
