= Tensor lamp =

Model of desk lamp

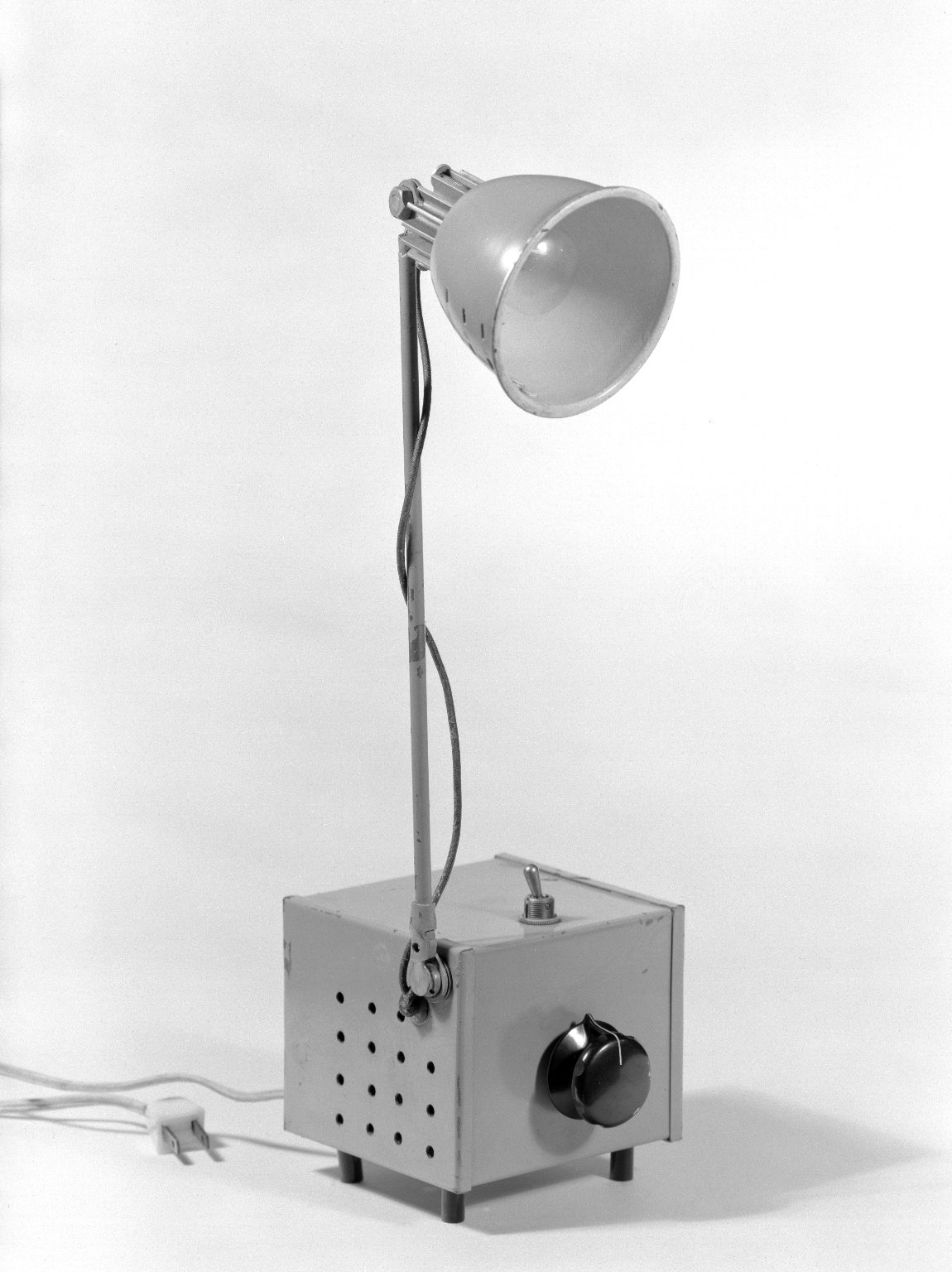
- Tensor high intensity lamp prototype (ca 1959, Brass, steel, copper, plastic, glass). Kept at the Brooklyn Museum. Gift of Jay Monroe
- Product type: Small high-intensity low-voltage desk lamp
- Produced by: Tensor Corporation
- Country: United States
- Introduced: 1960; 66 years ago
- Discontinued: c. 1980; 46 years ago
- Markets: United States

A Tensor lamp is a trademarked brand of small high-intensity low-voltage desk lamp invented by Jay Monroe. The lamp was mainly popular during the 1960s and 1970s. The lamp was originally used by doctors and dentists, and later became more widely used. The first prototype was created in 1959, and the lamp was commercialized in 1960 by the Tensor Corporation.

== History ==
The first Tensor lamp consisted of a 12-volt automobile light bulb and a reflector made from a kitchen measuring cup. Monroe fixed the cup to a metal tube that was attached to a transformer, which reduced 115-volt house current to 12 volts. Because of the small bulb, the entire lamp could be made smaller with a light-directing shade. Monroe was issued a patent for his invention.

By 1963, the lamp was sold to the general public as a decorative desk lamp for home and office, and several other manufacturers soon entered the field. Its main competitors during the 1960s were the similar-looking Lampette brand of lamps manufactured by Koch Creations, the Mobilette, a series of Italian designed lamps sold by Stiffel, and Lytegem lamp designed by Michael Lax and manufactured by Lightolier.

== See also ==
- Tiffany lamp
- Tizio
- Tolomeo desk lamp
