= Carlotta de Bevilacqua =

Italian architect, designer and entrepreneur

Carlotta de Bevilacqua (born 23 June 1957) is an Italian architect, designer and entrepreneur. She is currently President and CEO of Artemide and President of Danese Milano.

== Biography ==
Graduated in 1983 in Architecture at the Politecnico di Milano, she is mainly known for her research in contemporary lighting design.

In the early 1990s she started to design lighting projects for the Italian companies Artemide and Danese, developing a new generation of LED products, recognized with several patents and awards.

Her products have been selected for several international exhibitions on contemporary design (Centre Pompidou in Paris, Serpentine Gallery in London, La Triennale di Milano) and have been awarded at some of the most important international design awards (IF Product Design Award, Red Dot Design Award and Wallpaper Design Award).

Since 2001 she is a Lecturer of Lighting Design at Politecnico di Milano.

== Exhibitions ==
1999 La Triennale di Milano – "Essere e Benessere"

2005 Centre Pompidou, Paris – “D-Day. Le Design Aujourd'hui”

2009 Centre Pompidou, Paris – "Elles@centrepompidou – Artistes femmes dans les collections du Musée national d'art moderne"

2009 Indianapolis Museum of Art – "European Design Since 1985: Shaping the New Century"

2010 Serpentine Gallery, London – Mostra: "Design Real"

2010 St Etienne Biennal

== Awards ==
2010 Good Design Award for the lamp Tian Xia 500

2011 Red Dot Design Award for the lamps Algoritmo and Copernico

2013 iF Product Design Award, Discipline Product, for the lamp Cata

2014 Wallpaper Design Award for Best Transparency for the lamp Empatia

2014 iF Product Design Award, Discipline Product, for the lamp Empatia

2020 Forbes CEO Award, Top Manager of the Year in Design category
