= Luigi Caccia Dominioni =

Italian architect and furniture designer

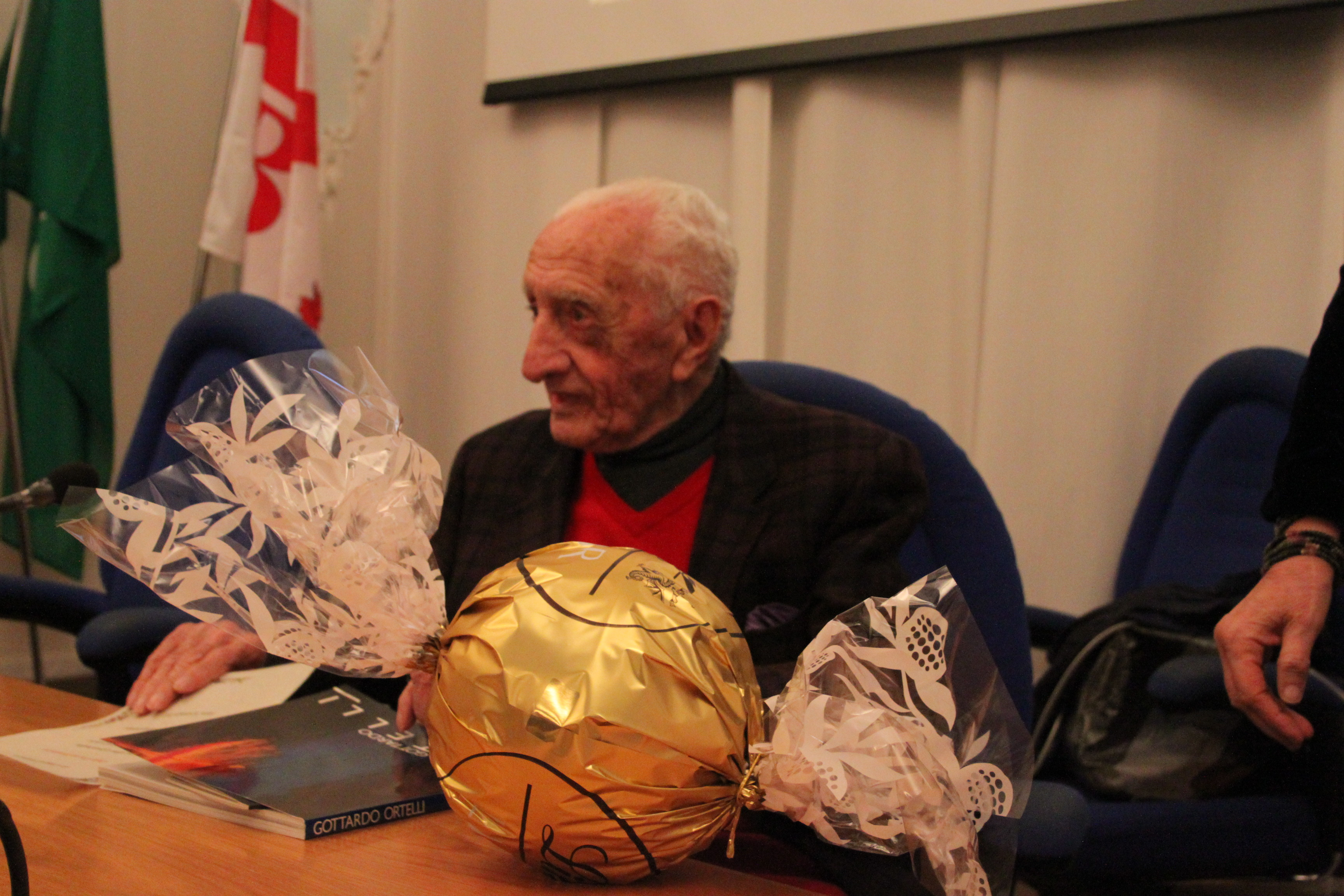
- Luigi Caccia Dominioni in 2013
- Born: 7 December 1913; Milan, Italy
- Died: 13 November 2016 (aged 102); Milan, Italy
- Education: Polytechnic University of Milan
- Occupations: Architect, furniture designer

Office building in Milan, 1953–1959

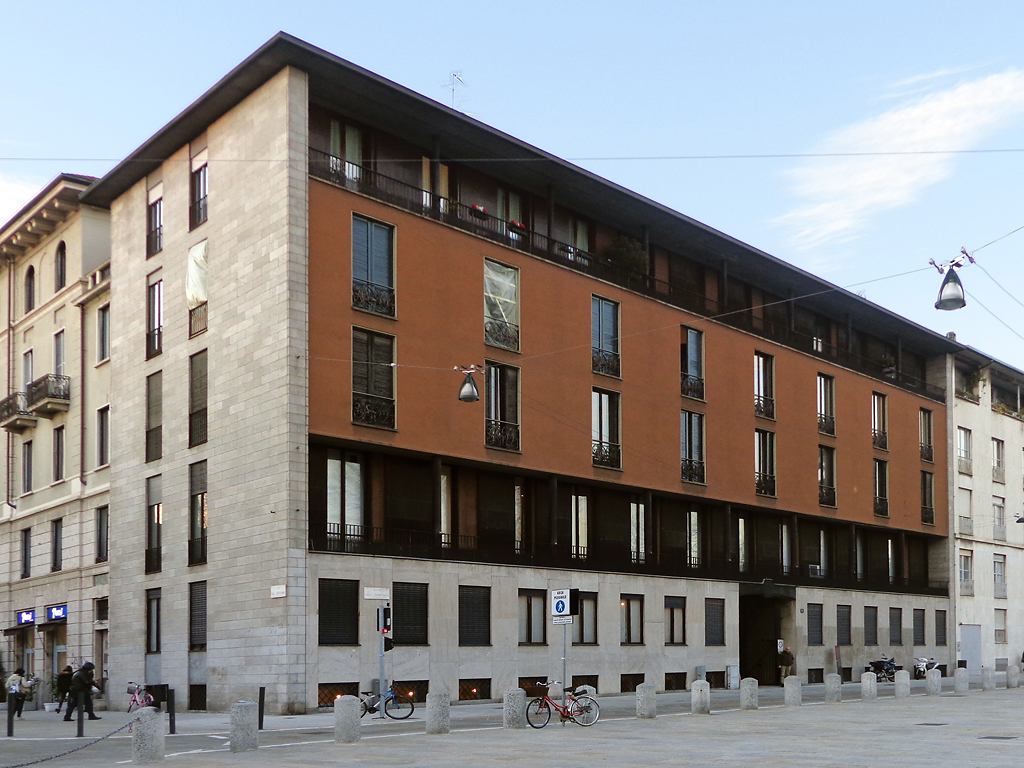
Residential building in Piazza Sant’Ambrogio, Milan, 1947–1950

Luigi Caccia Dominioni (7 December 1913 – 13 November 2016) was an Italian architect and furniture designer.

== Life ==
Caccia Dominioni was born on 7 December 1913 in Milan, in Lombardy in northern Italy, to Ambrogio Caccia Dominioni, a lawyer, and Maria Paravicini; the family was a noble one, with origins in Novara, in Piemonte.

Caccia Dominioni graduated from the Politecnico di Milano in 1936, and opened a studio with two fellow-students, Livio and Pier Giacomo Castiglioni. He was in the Italian army during the Second World War, but when the puppet Republic of Salò was established in 1943, he refused to recognise it and fled to Switzerland. After the war he returned to Milan and, with Corrado Corradi Dell'Acqua and Ignazio Gardella, started Azucena, a company which designed both furniture and furnishings such as door-handles and lamps.

== Work ==
Caccia Dominioni designed many buildings in Milan, notably overseeing the internal restructuring of the Biblioteca and the Pinacoteca Ambrosiana.

In 1947, Caccia founded Azucena with Ignazio Gardella and Corrado Corradi for which he created hundreds of design objects including lamps and furniture. He received the Compasso d'Oro award several times, including for the "Cdo" chair, the Palini "T.12" school chair (1960), and the Super door (1984). His extensive architectural production, characterized by the ability to dialogue with the pre-existing structures without renouncing the use of new forms and technologies, begins with the construction of the family home in Piazza Sant'Ambrogio in Milan (1947–49), which followed by the BVA institute in via Calatafimi (1948–54), the Loro-Parisini in via Savona (1951–57), the office and residential complexes in Corso Europa and Corso Italia (1953–66 and 1953–59), the building of Santa Maria alla Porta (1961), the building of Cartiere Binda (1966), the connection between the church of San Fedele and the Manhattan Bank in piazza Meda (1969), the residential buildings in via Ippolito Nievo and piazza Carbonari (1955–56 and 1960–61), the complex in San Felice with Magistretti (1967–75), the Vanoni Library in Morbegno (1965–66), the Oxford Palace in Corso Milano in Monza (1963) and the Church of San Biagio in Monza (1968) and the two towers in the Principality of Monaco (1976–80) . From 1965 there were numerous collaborations with Francesco Somaini, such as in Milan for the renovation of the former Verziere, now Largo Marinai d'Italia - Formentano park, where Caccia invited the sculptor to study the suitable monument with him.

The eighties continue with the Monticello complex (begun in the seventies), that of Morbegno with the church of San Giuseppe, the arrangement of the elevated pedestrian paths of the Milan Fair. Between 1976 and 1983 he worked on the Parc Saint Roman, a residential complex in Monte Carlo.

== Death ==
Caccia Dominioni died on 13 November 2016 in Milan, Italy.
