= Michele De Lucchi =

Italian architect and designer

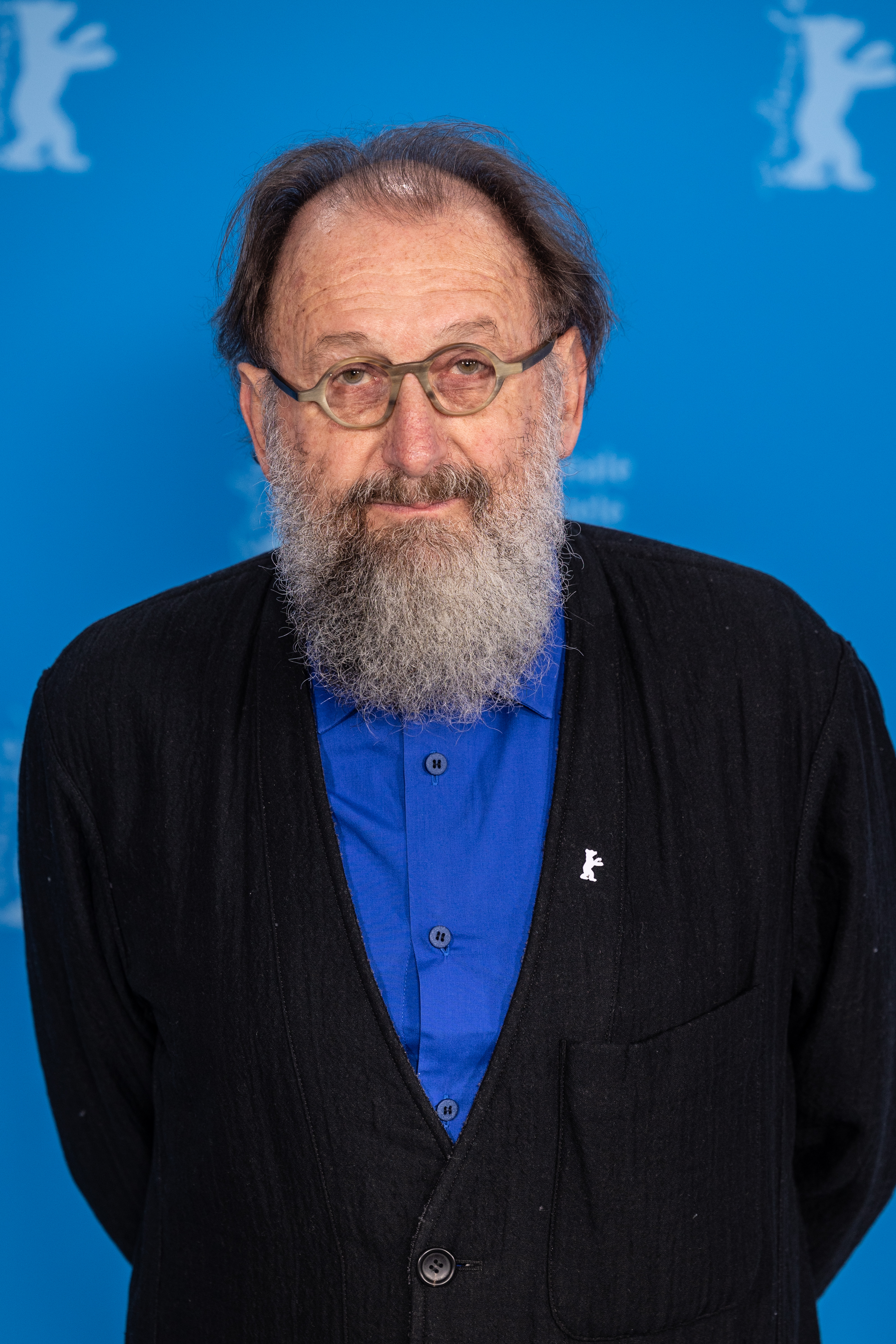
- De Lucchi at the 2024 Berlin Film Festival
- Born: 8 November 1951 (age 74); Ferrara
- Occupations: Architect; artist; designer

Michele de Lucchi (born 8 November 1951) is an Italian architect and designer.

== Biography ==
De Lucchi was born in 1951 in Ferrara and graduated in architecture from Florence. During the period of radical and experimental architecture he was a prominent figure in movements such as Cavart, Studio Alchimia and Memphis.

De Lucchi has designed lamps and furniture for well-known Italian and European companies, such as Artemide, Olivetti, Alias, Unifor, Hermès and Alessi. For Olivetti he was Director of Design from 1988 to 2002 and developed experimental projects for Compaq Computers, Philips, Siemens and Vitra. During this period, he developed a number of theories on the evolution of workplaces.

He has designed and restored buildings in Japan for NTT, in Germany for Deutsche Bank, in Switzerland for Novartis, and in Italy for Enel, Olivetti, Piaggio, Poste Italiane and Telecom Italia. In 1999 he was appointed to renovate a number of ENEL (the Italian Electricity Company) power plants. For Deutsche Bank, Deutsche Bundesbahn, ENEL, Poste Italine, Telecom Italia, Hera, Intesa Sanpaolo and other Italian and foreign banks he collaborated on the development of corporate image, introducing technical and aesthetic innovation into the workplace.

He has been involved with numerous art and design exhibitions, creating building plans for museums including the Triennale di Milano, Palazzo delle Esposizioni in Rome, Neues Museum in Berlin, Fondazione Cini in Venice, Gallerie d’Italia - Piazza Scala, Pietà Rondanini museum and Casa Manzoni in Milan. He has also developed a number of architectural projects for private and public client in Georgia, such as the Ministry of Internal Affairs and the Bridge of Peace in Tbilisi. More recently he has undertaken a number of projects for the city of Milan including the pavilions for Expo 2015 (Padiglione Zero, Expo Center, Intesa Sanpaolo), the UniCredit Pavilion in Piazza Gae Aulenti and Aquae Pavilion in Venice with Giovanni Caprioglio and Filippo Caprioglio.

His professional work has always run in tandem with a personal exploration of design, technology and craftsmanship. Since 2004 he has sculptured small wooden houses using a chain saw to create the essence of the architectural style.

In 2003 the Centre Georges Pompidou in Paris acquired a considerable number of his works. Selections of his products are exhibited at various design museums in Europe, United States and Japan.

In 2000 he was appointed Officer of Italian Republic by President Ciampi, for services to design and architecture. In 2001 he was nominated Professor at the Design and Art Faculty, University of Venice. In 2006 he received an Honorary Doctorate from Kingston University, for his contribution to “living quality”. In 2008 he was nominated Professor at the Design Faculty of the Politecnico of Milan and Member of the Accademia Nazionale di San Luca in Rome.

== Industrial design ==
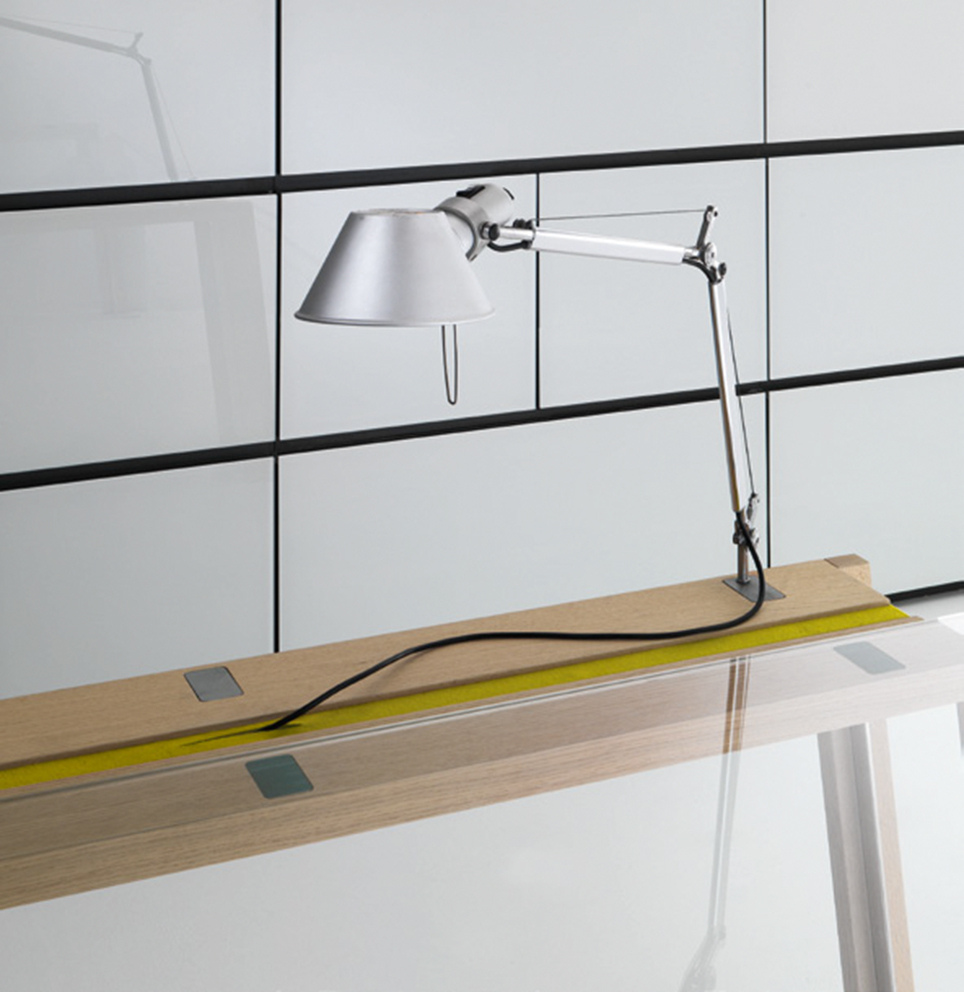
Tolomeo lamp

Michele de Lucchi is known for many objects of industrial design, the most famous are:

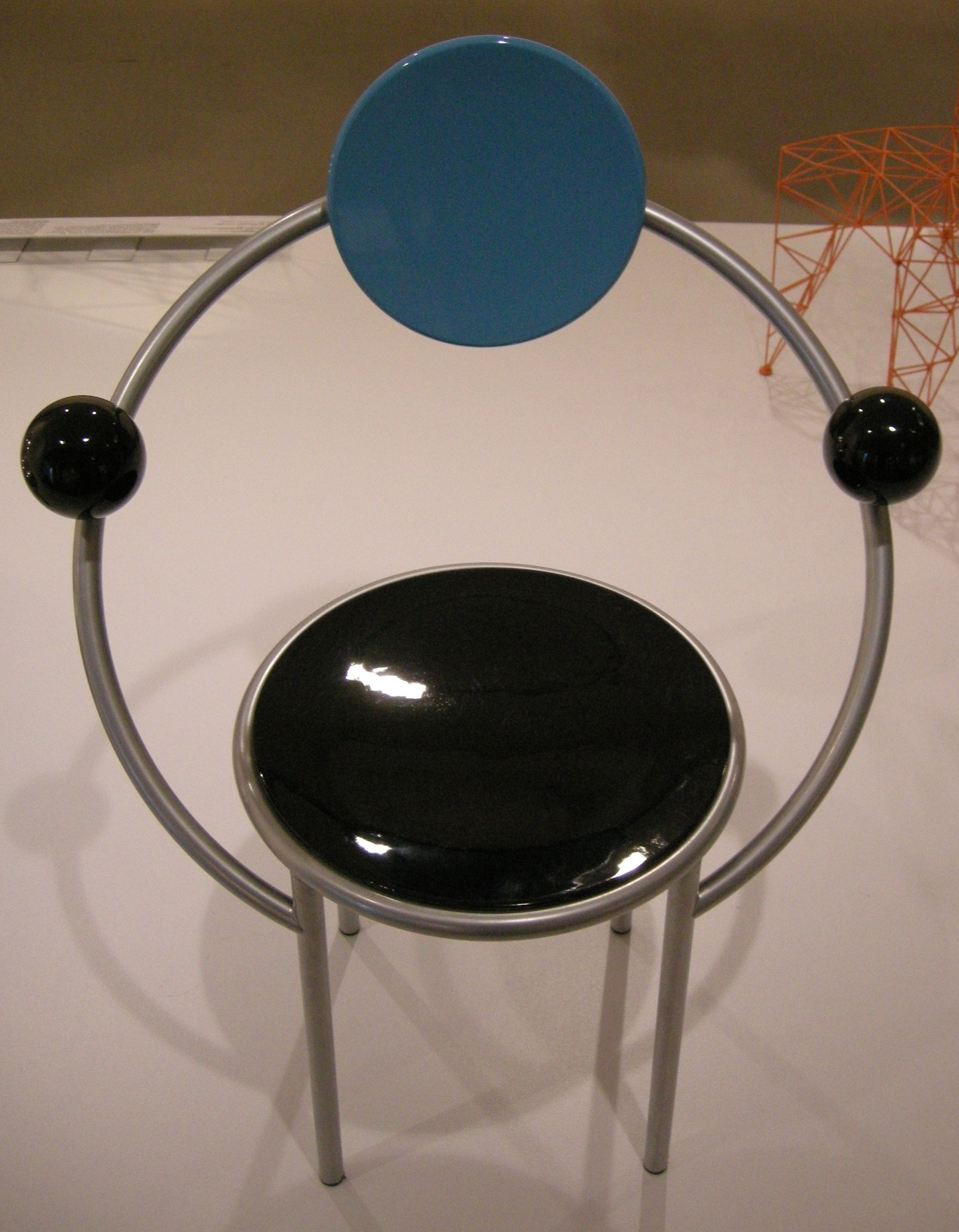
First Chair, 1983

- The First Chair for Memphis (design) (1983);
- The Tolomeo lamp for Artemide (company) (1986) (Compasso d'Oro prize 1989) in collaboration with Giancarlo Fassina;
- The Castore LED lamp for Artemide (2003) (Compasso d’Oro prize 2004);
- The fluorescent lamp Noto for Artemide (2008);
- The table Vegan for Riva 1920 (2009) in collaboration with Davide Angeli;
- The bookcase Existence for De Castelli (2010);

== Awards ==
1987

- SNAI-Oscar des Architectures d'Interieur (France), Tolomeo desk lamp, Artemide
- Haus Industrieform (Germany), Tolomeo desk lamp, Artemide

1988

- Deutsche-Auswahl, Design Center Stuttgart (Germany), Tolomeo lamp family, Artemide
- Netherlands Industrial Design Foundation Award (the Netherlands), roll-fix Kleberoller, Pelikan
- Good Design Award (Japan), sun glasses, Charmant

1989

- Compasso d'Oro, ADI (Italy), Tolomeo lamp family, Artemide
- Design Plus (Germany), roll-fix Kleberoller, Pelikan

1990

- SMAU Industrial Design Award (Italy), automatic banking terminal (ATM) CD 6300, Olivetti-Siab

1991

- Office Design Eimu (Italy), desk accessories Segmenti, Kartell

1992

- Design Innovationen, Design Zentrum Nordrhein-Westfalen (Germany), Sigira lamp, Classicon

1993

- Design Preis Schweiz (Switzerland), Sigira lamp, Classicon

1994

- IF Award for good Industrial Design (Germany), laptop Philos 44, Olivetti
- IF Award for good Industrial Design (Germany), multimedia kiosks MK Sys 6000, Olivetti

1995

- SMAU Industrial Design Award (Italy), computer box Envision, Olivetti
- Design Plus (Germany), salt and pepper Ginger e Fred, Rosenthal
- Design Innovationen, Design Zentrum Nordrhein-Westfalen (Germany), self-service banking terminal MS 6050, Olivetti

1996

- SMAU Industrial Design Award (Italia), printer PR 2, Olivetti
- IF Award for good Industrial Design (Germany), printer Ink Jet JP 170, Olivetti
- IF Award for good Industrial Design (Germany), Tolomeo clamp lamp, Artemide

1997

- Design Innovationen, Design Zentrum Nordrhein-Westfalen (Germany), office furniture Sistemare, Mauser Office
- Design Innovationen, Design Zentrum Nordrhein-Westfalen (Germany), interni delle biglietterie ferroviarie (Reisezentrum Deutsche Bahn), Deutsche Bahn
- IF Product Design Award–Best of Category (Germany), interiors of railway ticket offices (Reisezentrum Deutsche Bahn), Deutsche Bahn
- IF Product Design Award–Excellent Design (Germany), self-service ticket office (Reisezentrum Deutsche Bahn), Deutsche Bahn
- I.D. Annual Design Review (US), workshop Domestic Chips, Olivetti
- I.D. Annual Design Review (US), office furniture Eidos / Pegaso, Olivetti Synthesis
- I.D. Annual Design Review (US), Acquatinta lamp, Produzione Privata

2000

- Design Plus Light+Building (Germany), Dioscuri lamp, Artemide
- Innovationspreis, Architektur und Office (Germany), office chair Attivo 480, Mauser Office
- Innovationspreis, Architektur und Office (Germany), office furniture Sistemare, Mauser Office
- Design Innovationen, Design Zentrum Nordrhein-Westfalen (Germany), office chair Attivo 480, Mauser Office
- Design Innovationen, Design Zentrum Nordrhein-Westfalen (Germany), Roter Punkt für höhe Designqualität, Dioscuri lamp, Artemide
- IF Product Design Award (Germany), office chair Attivo 480, Mauser Office
- IF Product Design Award (Germany), fax Jet Lab 600, Olivetti

2001

- Compasso d'Oro, ADI (Italy), printer Artjet 10, Olivetti
- Designpreis des Landes Nordrhein Westfalen-Ehrenpreis für Productdesign (Germany), outdoor lighting Palme, Artemide
- IF Product Design Award (Germany), decentralized Tolomeo lamp, Artemide
- IF Product Design Award (Germany), outdoor lighting Palme, Artemide

2002

- Reddot Design Award, Design Zentrum Nordrhein-Westfalen (Germany), Logico lamps, Artemide
- Designpreis der Bundesrepublik (Germany), outdoor lighting Palme Artemide

2003

- Medaglia d'Oro all'architettura italiana, Triennale (Italy), Medaglia d'Oro finalist in private clients, concept and philosophy of Poste Italiane
- Reddot Design Award, Design Zentrum Nordrhein-Westfalen (Germany), Tolomeo floor lamp mega, Artemide

2004

- Design Plus Light+Building (Germany), Castore lamp, Artemide
- Design Plus Light+Building (Germany), Logico lamp and suspension mini, Artemide
- Reddot Design Award, Design Zentrum Nordrhein-Westfalen (Germany), Castore lamp, Artemide

2005

- IF Design Award (Germany), office system MDL, Unifor
- The Abitare il Tempo Award (Italy)

2008

- Compasso d'Oro - Selezione, ADI (Italy), office system Layout, Alias
- IF Product Design Award - Best of Category (Germany), access bridge to the Triennale Design Museum, Milan

2009

- Reddot Design Award, Best of the Best (Germany), lampada Noto, Artemide
- Good Design Award (US), Noto lamp, Artemide
- Good Design Award (US), Soffione lamp, Artemide
- US Award (Italy), 2° prize wood@work, interior design of Biblioteca di S. Giorgio in Poggiale, Bologna

2010

- Premio dei premi per l'innovazione, Quirinale (Italy) wooden floor collection Natural Genius Medoc, Listone Giordano
- EDIDA, Elle Decoration International Design Awards (Italy), parquet Medoc®, Listone Giordano

2011

- US Award (Italy), 1° prize Interior design, bank affiliate Superflash Intesa Sanpaolo, Milan (Italy)
- Compasso d'Oro - Selezione, ADI (Italy), parquet Medoc®, Listone Giordano
- IF Product Design Award (Germany), lamp Led Net line, Artemide
- US Award (Italy), 2° prize Interior design, Triennale Design Museum offices, Milan

2012

- GrandesignEtico International Award (Italy), acoustic panel Mitesco, Caimi Brevetti
- Medaglio d'oro all'archittetura italiana, Triennale (Italy), Nuova Manica Lunga, Fondazione Cini. Honorable mention in conversion and restoration category
- Premio Federico Bernagozzi, Municipality of Portomaggiore (Ferrara, Italy)

2015

- Wallpaper* Design Award (United Kingdom), best building site for Padiglione Zero
- Architektur und Wohnen (Germany), A&W Designer des Jahres

2016

- GOOD Design Awards, (US), Pulcina Coffee Maker, Alessi
- MAPIC Awards (Italy), Il Centro Mall, Arese

2017

- Wallpaper* Design Awards (US), Best garden Party, Tolomeo Lampione outdoor lamp, Artemide
- Special Award, Segnalazione della Giuria, Contest of Wood Architecture, Pavilion Zero, (Italy)

== Collections ==
- Design Museum, Ghent (Belgium)
- Musée des Arts Décoratifs de Montréal, Québec (Canada)
- Musée des beaux-arts de Montréal, Québec (Canada)
- Designmuseo, Helsinki (Finland)
- Centre Georges Pompidou, Paris (France)
- Bridge of Peace, Tbilisi (Georgia)
- Museum für Kunst und Gewerbe, Hamburg (Germany)
- Vitra Design Museum, Weil am Rhein (Germany)
- Museum of Design, Thessaloniki, Macedonia (Greece)
- The Israel Museum, Jerusalem (Israel)
- Civica Galleria d'Arte Moderna-Sezione Design, Gallarate (Italy)
- Centro Legno Arredo Cantù, Collezione Storica del Premio Compasso d'Oro ADI (Italy)
- Galleria Nazionale d'Arte Moderna, Rome (Italy)
- Museo Alessi, Omegna (Italy)
- Museo Kartell, Milan (Italy)
- Museo Nazionale della Scienza e della Tecnica Leonardo da Vinci, Milano (Italy)
- National Gallery of Victoria, Melbourne (Australia)
- Triennale di Milano-Collezione Permanente del Design Italiano, Milano (Italy)
- Groninger Museum, Groningen (the Netherlands)
- Stedelijk Museum of Modern Art, Amsterdam (the Netherlands)
- The National Museum, Poznań (Poland)
- Museum für Gestaltung, Zurich (Switzerland)
- Art Center College of Design, Pasadena, California (US)
- MFA Museum of Fine Arts, Boston (US)
- Rokkosan Silence Resort (Japan)

== Note ==
1. Architetto ferrarese alla conquista della Georgia, su www.estense.com. URL last accessed date 16 March 2017.

== Bibliography ==
- S. Kicherer, “Raccolta completa di Produzione Privata”, Produzione Privata, Milano 1999
- H. Hoeger, “Michele De Lucchi, Architektur, Innenarchitechtur, Design”, Deutsche Verlags Anstalt, Munich 2001
- S. Suardi, “Michele De Lucchi. Dopotolomeo”, Milano, Skira, 2002
- F. Bulgeato, S. Polano, “Michele De Lucchi. Comincia qui e finisce là”, Milano, Electa, 2004
- E. Del Drago, “La Triennale di Milano. Design, territorio, impresa: il progetto nella narrazione di Davide Rampello con Michele De Lucchi e Aldo Bonomi”, Roma, Sossella, 2004
- M. De Lucchi, “12 racconti con casette”, Edizioni Corraini, Mantova, 2005
- S. Annicchiarico (a cura di), “Michele De Lucchi. Il Museo del Design e la nuova Triennale”, Milano, Electa, 2008
- M. De Lucchi, “Experimental work, design & architecture”, Nomos Edizioni, Busto Arsizio 2008
- A. Branzi, “Ritratti e autoritratti di Design”, Marsilio, Venezia, 2010
- "And”, rivista monografica, gennaio/aprile 2010, n. 17, Firenze, 2010
- “Michele De Lucchi. Il Ponte della Pace. Tbilisi, Georgia”, Electa, 2011
- “Independent. Design Secession”, exhibition catalogue, Triennale Design Museum, 2011
- “Michele De Lucchi. Il Ponte della Pace. Tbilisi, Georgia”, Electa, 2011
- Vedute", rivista monografica, n. 1, Quodlibet, 2011
- A. Biamonti con M. Corradi (a cura di), “Michele De Lucchi”, collana “I maestri del design”, n. 20, Il Sole 24 Ore, 2011
- "Lezioni di architettura e design - De Lucchi", Corriere della Sera - Abitare, n.35, 2016
