= Ernesto Gismondi =

Italian designer (1931–2020)

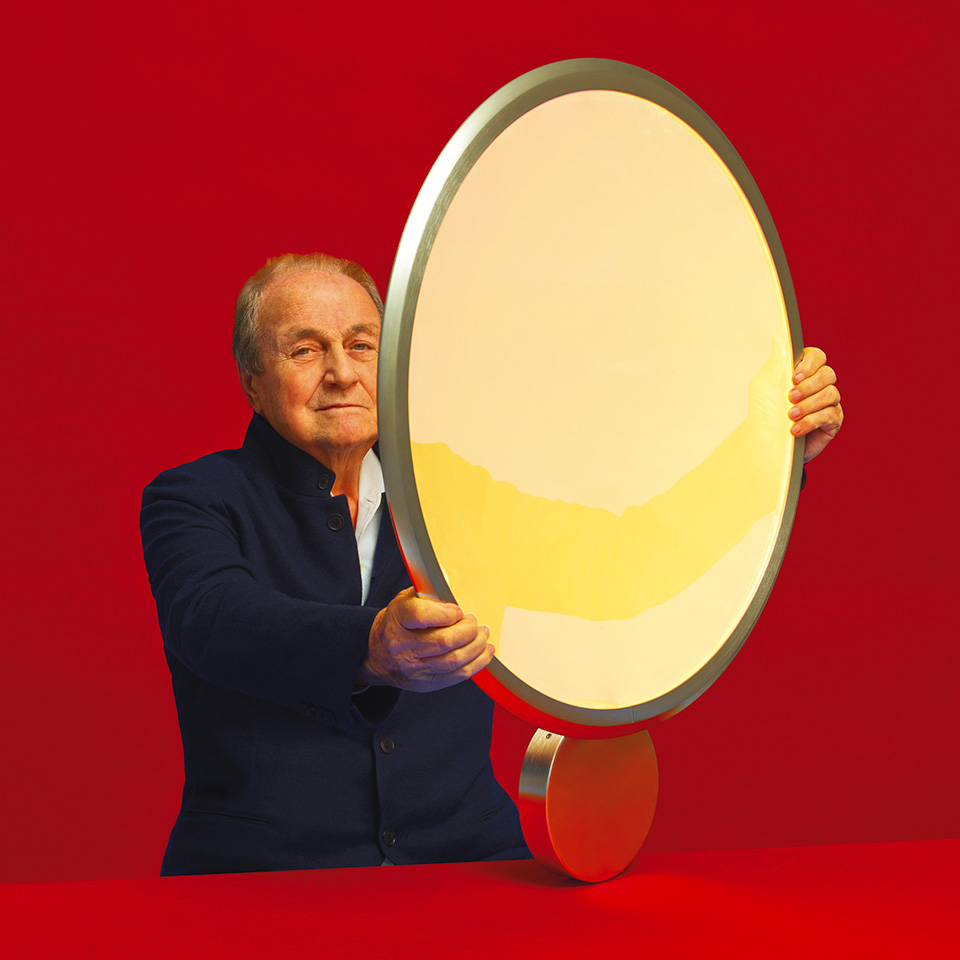
- Gismondi with one of the lamps he designed
- Born: 25 December 1931; Sanremo, Italy
- Died: 31 December 2020 (aged 89)

Ernesto Gismondi (25 December 1931 – 31 December 2020) was an Italian designer, founder of Artemide. Gismondi was best known for designing light fixtures.

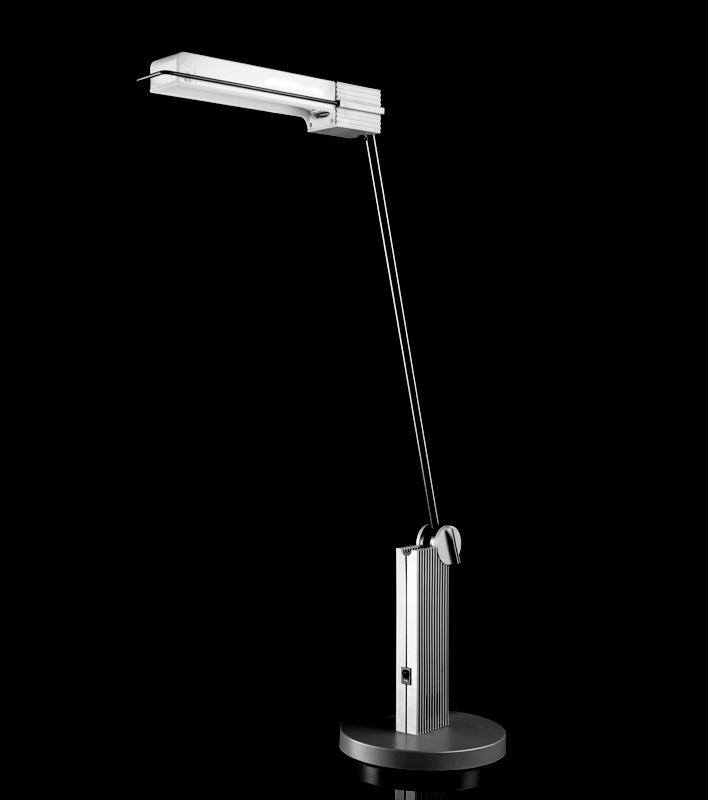
Artemide Alistro Lamp

== Biography ==
Graduated at the Politecnico di Milano in 1957 in aeronautical engineering, and received his degree in missile engineering at the Scuola Superiore di Ingegneria Missilistica in Rome in 1959. The following year, together with designer Sergio Mazza, he founded Studio Artemide S.a.s., from which the Artemide Group was established, introducing the use of plastics for the design of objects inspired by his knowledge of missile engineering.

He later became a member and one of the creators of Memphis, an avant-garde movement founded in 1981 by Ettore Sottsass, who also collaborated with Artemide.

From 1964 to 1984 he was associate professor of rocket engines at the Politecnico di Milano.

Considered one of the great protagonists of the Made in Italy design in the world, he specialised in designing lamps and lighting systems, which have received numerous awards, including the Compasso d'Oro. During his life he held various roles in the fields of design and entrepreneurship. He was vice-president of ADI – Associazione Design Industriale and held numerous positions within the Associazione Industriale Lombarda (Assolombarda), Federmeccanica, Confindustria, Ente Autonomo Fiera di Milano and at the Ministero per l'Università e la Ricerca.

== Awards ==
- European Design Awards 1997
- Premio Ernst & Young Imprenditore dell'Anno 2008 per la categoria Innovation
- Premio Ernst & Young L'Imprenditore dell'Anno 2009 per la categoria Communication
- iF Product Design Award 2014
- Red Dot Design Award 2017
- Premio alla carriera Milano Award 2017
- Premio Compasso d'Oro per Discovery Sospensione (2018)
- Premio Compasso d'Oro alla Carriera (2018)
