= Nest of tables =

Set of tables that slide into one another for storage

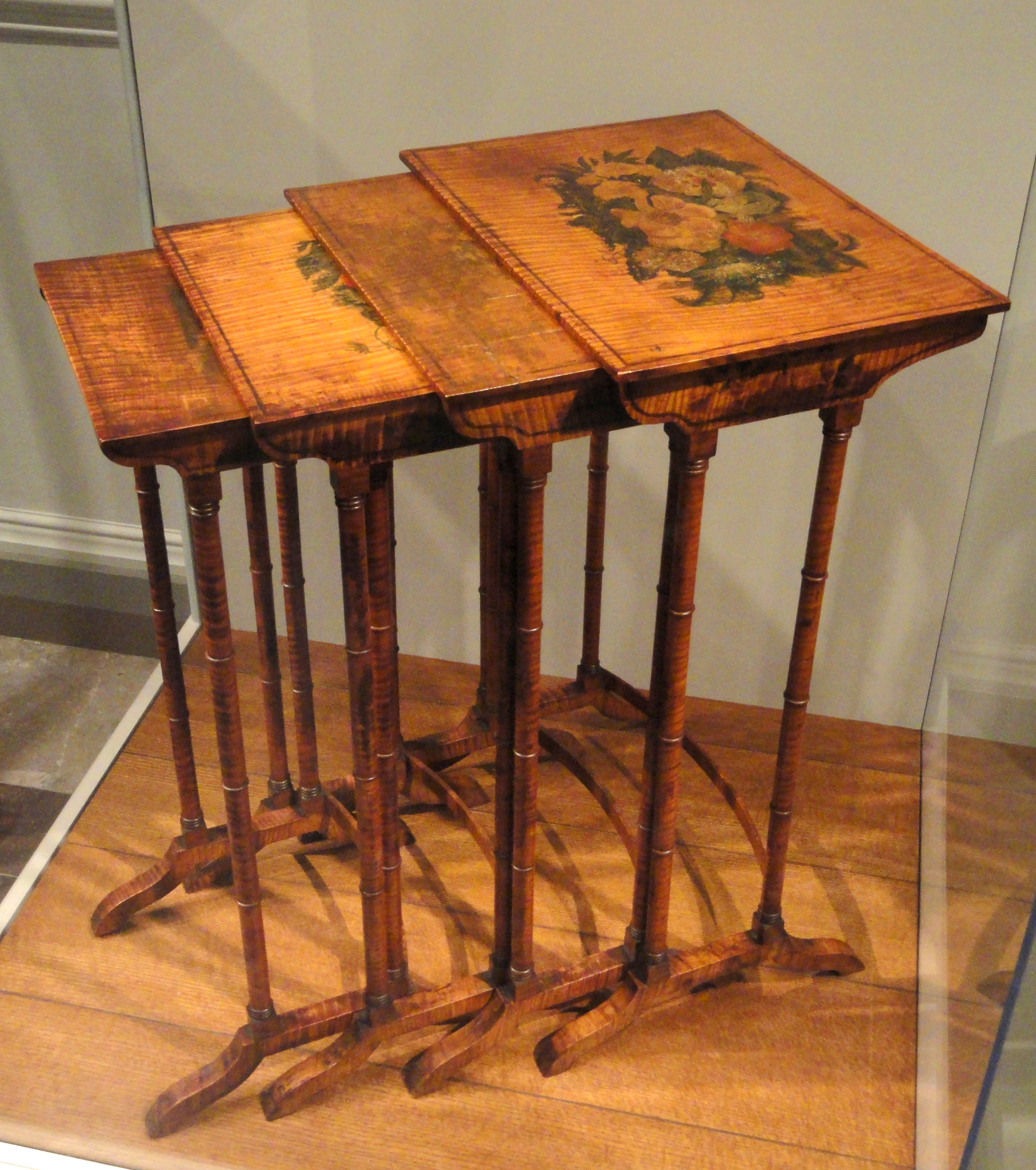
Nest of tables ("quartetto", early 1800s)

Nest of tables (also known as nested tables, nesting tables) is a set of few tables with progressively smaller heights and frames, so that they can be stacked when not in use. A smaller table slides inside the frame of a larger one until it engages the edge of the back frame.

Typically a set contains three (trio) or four (quartetto) tables. Thomas Sheraton in his "Cabinet Dictionary" (1803) describes the design as "kind of small worktable made to draw out of each other, and may be used separately, and again enclosed within each other when not wanted". At the time, the nest of tables was considered women's furniture.

Sheraton's design was quickly replicated in China, with gilded and lacquered items mass-produced for sale in the West.

While the idea is fairly old (the stacks of tables became popular in the early 19th century), the concept of nested tables became one of the symbols of the Bauhaus design approach after the sets by Josef Albers and Marcel Breuer in the mid-1920s that exemplified simple forms combined with functionality for everyday use. The nest of tables at the time was promoted as a way to hold bridge parties and afternoon teas in the living room.

== Sources ==
- Gloag, J. (2022). "Nest of Tables". A Short Dictionary of Furniture: Containing Over 2,600 Entries That Include Terms and Names Used in Britain and the USA. Taylor & Francis. ISBN 978-1-000-77614-0.
- How Art Works: The Concepts Visually Explained. DK How Stuff Work. DK Publishing. 2022. ISBN 978-0-7440-7902-9.
- Ambler, F. (2018). "Nesting Tables". The Story of the Bauhaus. The Story of ... Octopus. ISBN 978-1-78157-658-8.
- Muthesius, H.; Sharp, D. (2007). The English House: The interior. Frances Lincoln. ISBN 978-0-7112-2688-3.
- Kenny, P.M.; Phyfe, D.; Brown, M.K.; Bretter, F.F.; Thurlow, M.A. (2011). "Nesting Tables, 1841". Duncan Phyfe: Master Cabinetmaker in New York. Metropolitan Museum of Art. ISBN 978-1-58839-442-2.
- Priscilla Publishing Co (1925). Modern Priscilla Home Furnishing Book. Priscilla Publishing Company.
