= Tolomeo desk lamp =

Balanced-arm desk lamp

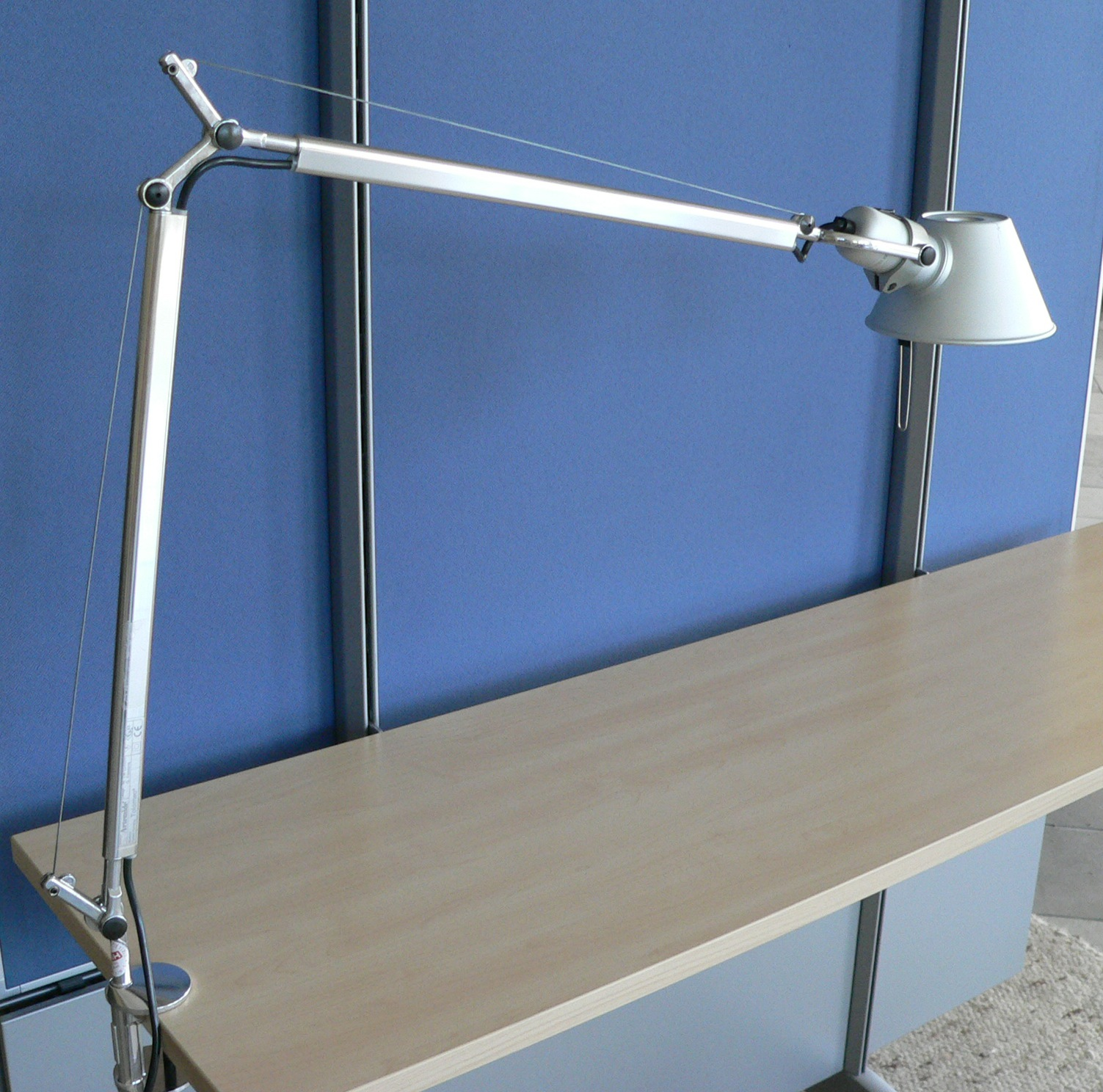

The Tolomeo incandescent desk lamp is an icon of Italian modern design. It was designed by Michele De Lucchi and Giancarlo Fassina in 1986 for the Artemide company. It won the Compasso d'Oro design prize in 1989.

It is a balanced-arm lamp with external steel tension cables attached to springs hidden inside the arms. Its original configuration was a desk lamp with a heavy base, two straight polished aluminium arm sections (each approximately 45 cm long), and a matte aluminium reflector head which can swivel 360°. Many variants are now produced, including floor lamps and wall sconces.

Tolomeo is the Italian version of the name Claudius Ptolemy (Claudio Tolomeo), after whom the lamp is named.

It is sometimes considered as the successor of Artemide's Tizio lamp, with the advantages of a swiveling shade.
