= Artemide =

Italian lighting manufacturer

Artemide S.p.A.
- Company type: Privately held
- Founded: 1960
- Headquarters: Pregnana Milanese, Italy
- Area served: Worldwide
- Key people: Ernesto Gismondi, Carlotta de Bevilacqua
- Products: Lighting
- Website: artemide.com

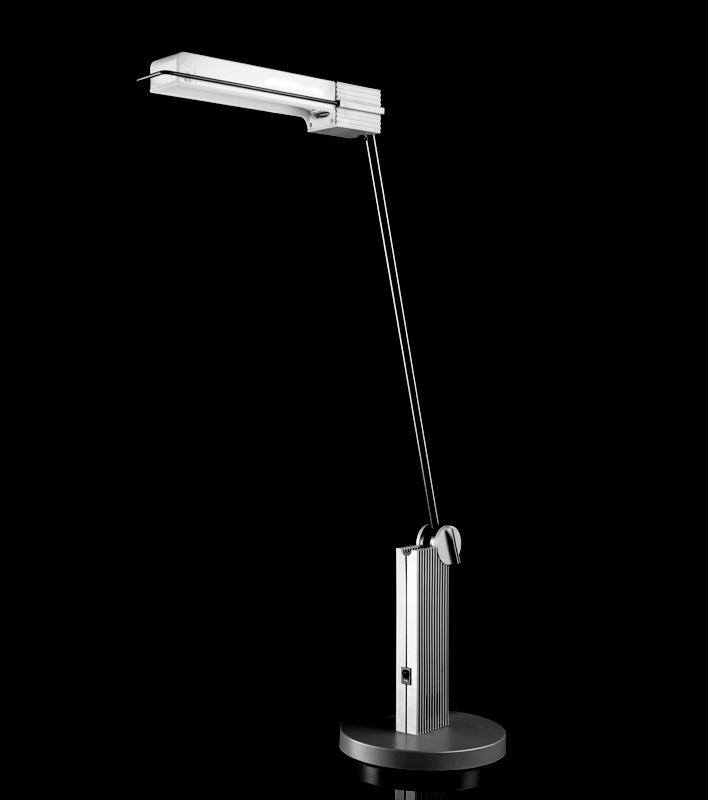
Alistro Lamp designed by Ernesto Gismondi

Artemide (Italian pronunciation: [ar'temide]) is a design-oriented Italian manufacturer founded by Ernesto Gismondi and Sergio Mazza in 1960. Based in Pregnana Milanese, a suburb of Milan, the company specialises in the manufacture of lighting designed by designers and architects.

== Company history ==
The company is known for the Tizio desk lamp designed by Richard Sapper in 1972 and the Tolomeo desk lamp, designed by Michele De Lucchi and Giancarlo Fassina in 1986.

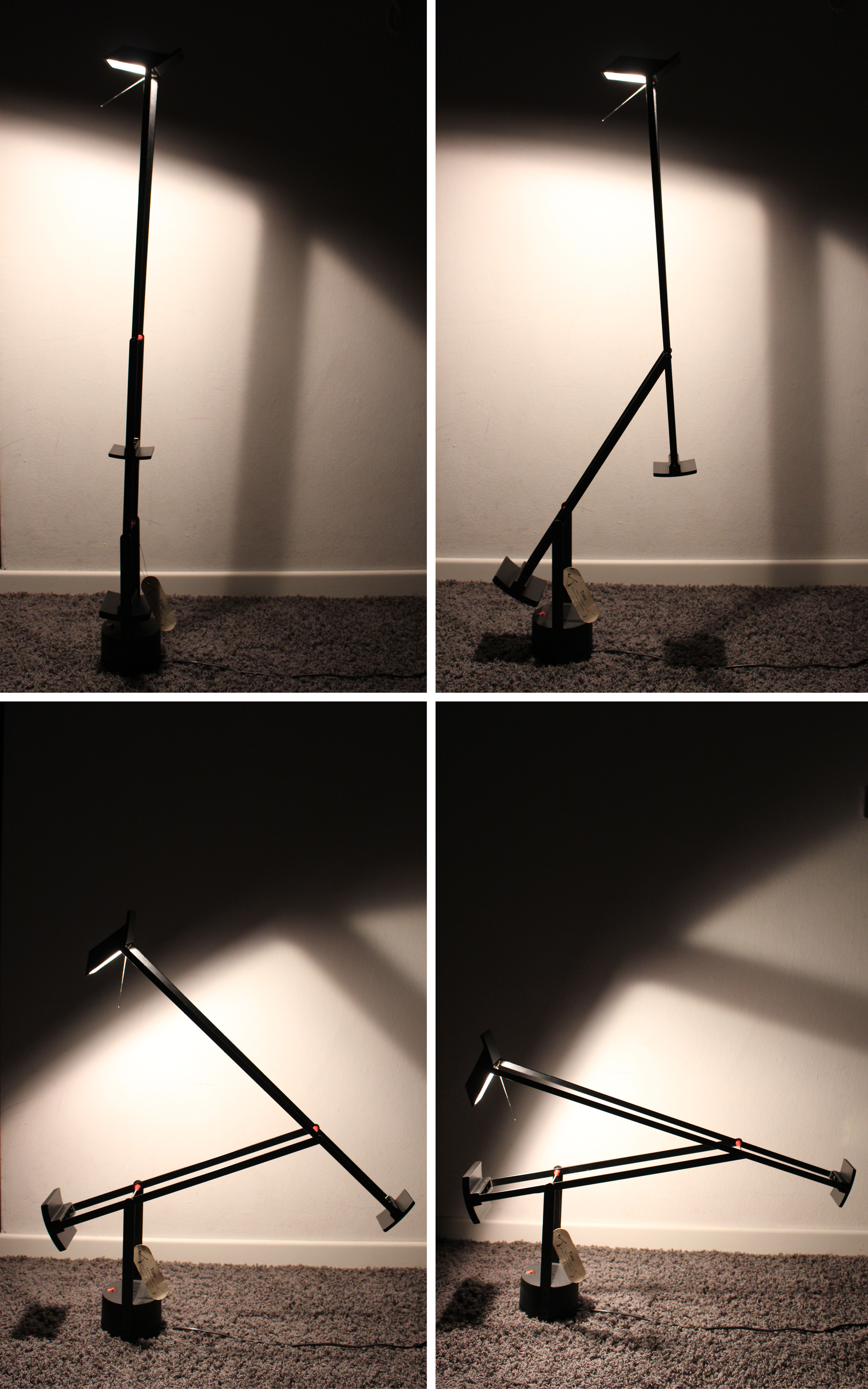
Tizio lamp designed by Richard Sapper (showing articulation)

Other designers who have collaborated with the company include Mario Botta, Sir Norman Foster, Michele De Lucchi, Richard Sapper, Ettore Sottsass, Enzo Mari, Neil Poulton, Karim Rashid, Giò Ponti, Zaha Hadid, Luigi Serafini, Cini Boeri, and Carlotta de Bevilacqua.

Artemide lamps are in permanent museum collections, including the Musée des Arts Décoratifs de Montreal, The Metropolitan Museum of Art in New York City, The Museum of Modern Art in New York City and the Galleria Nazionale d'Arte Moderna in Rome.

== Accolades ==
The company has won accolades, including the Compasso d'Oro award for lifetime achievement in 1995 and the European Design Prize in 1997.

In 2006 Artemide won two Best of The Best Red dot design awards for lamps designed by designer Neil Poulton and by architects Herzog & de Meuron.

In 2013 Artemide won the IF Product Design Award for the lamp Cata designed by light designer Carlotta de Bevilacqua.

== See also ==
- List of Italian companies
