= Tatiana Wedenison =

First Italian woman to attempt an engineering degree (born 1864)

- Born: 1864; Milan, Italy
- Education: Università di Pavia
- Known for: First woman to study at Polytechnic University of Milan (1888)

Tatiana Wedenison (born 1864) was the first woman in Italy to attempt earning an engineering degree, the first to enrol at the Polytechnic University of Milan (Italian: Politecnico di Milano), and one of the first modern Italian women to earn a university degree.

== Life and career ==
Wedenison was born in Milan in 1864. Her father was a shopkeeper.

She enrolled at the Politecnico di Milano in 1888, and later transferred to the Università di Pavia, from which she graduated with a degree in natural sciences (Italian: Laurea in Scienze Fisiche, Matematiche e Naturali) in 1893 or 1894.

Her accomplishment is significant in that by 1900, there were still only 250 female university students in the whole of Italy. She was followed by Emma Strada, who in 1908 became the first woman to obtain a civil engineering degree from the Polytechnic University of Turin, and Gaetanina Calvi, who in 1913 became the first female engineering graduate of the Polytechnic University of Milan.

== See also ==
- List of women who obtained doctoral degrees before 1800
