= Ada Bursi =

Italian architect and designer (1906–1996)

Ada Bursi (1906 Verona – 1996 Castiglione Torinese) was an Italian architect known for her work in graphic design, painting, interior design and architecture. She joined the Turin Order of Architects in 1940 as the first female architect to become a member.

== Early life and education ==
Ada Bursi was born in Verona in 1906, and then moved with her family to Turin. In the 1920s, she studied at the school of Felice Casorati. Tempera drawings of hers were first published in 1929, appearing in the magazine La Casa bella. She enrolled in the Regio Politecnico di Torino (now Politecnico di Torino), and graduated with a degree in architecture in 1938. She was the only woman in her class, though Guiseppa Audisio had graduated from the same school but did not continue working in the field.

== Career ==
In 1940 Bursi became the first female architect to join the Turin Order of Architects. Her initial professional experience included collaboration with Giovanni Muzio, an established architect in Milan, whom she worked for as an assistant. She began work in the Turin city's technical office in 1941, where she would be employed until 1971. In this role, she designed residential buildings, schools, and other public structures. She also designed apartments that were meant to be low-cost housing, but are now considered desirable apartments.

In 1945 Bursi was one of the founders of the Gruppo di Architetti Moderni Torinesi “Giuseppe Pagano”, the Modernist collective based in Turin. She Bursi began designing modular forms of furniture in 1946, part of a collaboration with Amedeo Albertini and Gino Becker.

Bursi was one of the first members of the Italian Association of Women Engineers and Architects (Italian: Associazione Italiana Donne Ingegneri e Architetti, or AIDIA), Italy’s professional association for women in engineering and architecture.

Bursi retired from the Order of Architects in 1975, and died in 1996 in Castiglione Torinese.

== See also ==
- Maria Artini – Italian engineer (1894–1951)
- Anna Castelli Ferrieri – Italian architect and designer (1918–2006)
- Elena Luzzatto – Italian architect (1900–1983)
- Adele Racheli – Italian engineer and patent office owner (1897–1992)
- Emma Strada – Italian engineer (1884–1970)
