= Carla De Benedetti =

Italian photographer and photojournalist

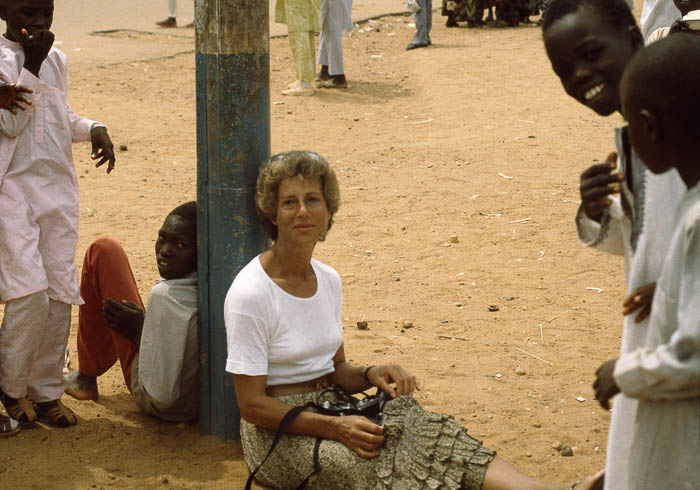
Carla De Benedetti in Katsina, Nigeria (1986)

Carla De Benedetti (16 August 1932 – 22 November 2013) was an Italian photographer and photojournalist whose professional interests focused on architecture and interiors. In addition for decades De Benedetti did photographic and documentary research on the cultures of Africa.

== Early life and career ==
Carla De Benedetti was born in Milan, Italy. Her mother, Susanna Teglio, was born near Lyon, in France. Her father, Arrigo De Benedetti, trained as an engineer and served as a Captain in the Italian artillery during World War I. In 1943 during World War II Italy was occupied by the German army. When the family learned they were about to be arrested by the Gestapo, the German secret police, they went into hiding. In December in the dead of night and winter they crossed the Alps mountains by foot and escaped into Switzerland.

Carla De Benedetti studied architecture in the Polytechnic University of Milan, Italy and then photography at the Kunstgewerbeschule (today University of the Arts) in Zurich, Switzerland. This experience gave her the opportunity to associate her knowledge of architectural design with a mastery of photographic techniques. In the 1960s the photography of architecture and interiors in Europe was the exclusive domain of male photographers. A former editor of the fashionable Italian periodical, Casa Vogue, had this to say about the situation: "When interior design began to develop as a widespread fashion among the elite of the new emerging bourgeoisie in Italy, Carla De Benedetti was taking her first steps as a photographer specialized in this field. She was the only woman in Italy, and probably in the whole world, among the few professional photographers in this sector."

With respect to architectural photography the situation was much the same. The glass ceilings De Benedetti had to break, effectively becoming one of the first women professionals in these fields, were formidable. To illustrate male attitudes she could be persuaded to tell the story of her first client. De Benedetti was hired by an Italian gentleman to photograph some furniture he was manufacturing. When she handed over the photos, which were everything he had asked for, he said something scornful about 'women' and refused to pay. De Benedetti took him to court and won, but never forgot the phrasing of the magistrate's verdict: how could a true gentleman refuse to pay so charming and beautiful a young lady!

== Studio De Benedetti ==
Despite the obstacles Carla De Benedetti persevered and established her own independent studio at 1 Via Spiga, Milano. As her reputation and fame grew she established a work ethic that she would follow for the rest of her career. De Benedetti would do the professional photography of architecture and interiors for roughly 9 months of the year. She would then suspend studio business and travel the world for the remainder of the year, focusing on non-Western countries and their cultures. In the 60's and 70's she spent time in Central and South America when it was difficult not to become involved with the liberation struggles that were taking place there. In 1967, working for a Mexican publication, she was accredited as a journalist by the Black Panther Party in Oakland, California.

With respect to her professional photography commentators have said that from the middle 60's De Benedetti was in her prime. In the past 20 years, her work has appeared in most European magazines. Her work featured regularly in important periodicals like Abitare, Ambiente, Architecture d'aujordhui, Architektur und Wohnen, Casa Vogue, Domus, Hauser, House & Garden, Hinterland, Maison Francaise, Schoner Wohnen, and Vogue.

In the 1960’s De Benedetti was able to work with a variety of mainly Italian architects and interior designers: Gae Aulenti, BBPR, Marcel Breuer, Luigi Caccia Dominioni, Joe Colombo, Adalberto Dal Lago, Vittorio Gregotti, Aldo Jacober, Philip Johnson, Vico Magistretti, Franco Mazzucchelli, Alessandro Meneghetti, Roberto Menghi, Bruno Sacchi, Alberto Seassaro, Giotto Stoppino, Gino Valle, and Carla Venosta.

In the 1970’s her studio became more international as she photographed the work of: Giancarlo Bicocchi, Cini Boeri, Ricardo Bofill, Oriol Bohigas, Ernesto Griffini, Romano Juvara, Richard Meier, Renzo Mongiardino, Roberto Monsani, Dario Montagni, Giorgio Pes, and Nanda Vigo.

In the 1980’s with her reputation well established her work was involved with, among others, the new generation of architects and designers: Guido Canella, Tony Cordero, Luigi Carlo Daneri, Claudio Dini, Luciano Grassi, Mark Held, Franco Mazzucchelli, Giovanni Michelucci, Rosanna Monzini, Piero Pinto, and Ettore Sottsass.

== UNESCO and Africa ==
In the mid 70's and 80's the focus of her independent research shifted to Africa, West Africa in particular. During a visit to Nigeria in 1985 she met Barry Hallen, then a professor at the University of Ife (now Obafemi Awolowo University). In 1986 they were wed at the local government office in Ile-Ife. Hallen had been in Nigeria for years doing research on the cultures of that country. With Carla De Benedetti as his partner photography became an important new dimension to that research.

In 1988 Carla De Benedetti and Barry Hallen were appointed co-directors of Southern Crossroads: Routes of Commerce and Culture Through West Africa and the Early Sudan, an associated project of UNESCO's Integral Study of the Silk Roads: Roads of Dialogue. With that UNESCO affiliation, the two continued to do independent research in West and East Africa during the 1980s and early 1990s. During the periods, Carla De Benedetti was creating an African photo archive. Her abilities as a trained professional photographer enabled her to record the cultures of Africa in a positive manner. The Africa photos today remain important to the archives of Studio De Benedetti.

Carla De Benedetti died in November 2013. She was buried in Africa.

== Bibliography ==
=== Books ===
- 2011 Interiors '70: The Photography of Carla De Benedetti, 2nd ed. London: Verbavolant. ISBN 9781905216192

=== Architecture and design books with significant Carla De Benedetti content ===
- 2010. La Pietra & La Pace; Stone & Peace. Milan, Italy: Mondadori Electa. ISBN 9788837076504
- 2007. Carla Venosta architetto e designer. Italy: Mondadori/Electa. ISBN 9788837058982
- 2006. I Maestri Comacini. Italy: Libri Scheiwiller Srl. ISBN 9788876444487
- 2000. Roberto Menghi. Italy: Electa. ISBN 9788843578191
- 1999. Il Sacro Monte di Ossuccio. Italy: Giorgio Mondadori. ISBN 978837414955
- 1996. Gae Aulenti. Milan, Italy: Rizzoli. ISBN 9788817243926
- 1992. Mediterranean Houses: Italy. Spain: Gili. ISBN 9788425215247
- 1993. Gae Aulenti: Museum Architecture. Milan, Italy: Edizioni Tecno.
- 1990. Abitare Italia; Italian Living Design. Italy: Fabbri; USA:Rizzoli; UK: Tauris Parke. ISBN 9780847811915
- 1990. East-West-East, Piero Pinto. Milano, Italy: SKIRA. ISBN 9798881189334
- 1989. Synnt. Helsinki: Museum of Contemporary Art. ISBN 9789529004423
- 1988. Dante Benini. Italy: Mondadori. ISBN 9788804309444
- 1985. Styles of Living: The Best of Casa Vogue. UK: Thames and Hudson. ISBN 9780500013380
- 1976. The Architecture of Luis Barragan. New York: The Museum of Modern Art. ISBN 9780870702334

=== Select publications in architecture and interiors periodicals ===
- 2008. "Tra Oriente e Occidente: Una Piccola Chiesa a Venezia [Between East and West: A Small Church in Venice] (P. Pinto)," Casamica 12: 88–95.
- 2007. "Un Documento del Moderno: Villa K2 [A Modern Document: Villa K2] (C. Mollino)," in Casamica 6: 107–110.
- 2006. "Piazza-Museo [Museum with Piazza] (R. Piano; the High Museum, Atlanta, GA)," Casamica :89-94.
- 2005. "Pietra Antica [Ancient Stone] (B. Sacchi)," Casamica n. 5: 170–75.
- 2005. "Libri & Progetto [Books and Project] (R. Meier)," Casamica n. 11: 20–27.
- 2004. "Una Casa Transparente a Lagos, Nigeria [A House that is Transparent at Lagos, Nigeria] (E. & A. Davies)," Casamica n. 3: 116–23.
- 2004. "Anni 60 [The Sixties] (F. Albini, F. Helg, A. Jacober, V. Porcelli, J. Colombo, L. Fiori, C. Ruggeri, C. Venosta, M. Pietrantoni, A. Seassaro)"; "Anni 70 [The Seventies] (J. Colombo, W. Rizzo, E. Sottsass, N. Vigo)"; "Anni 80 [The Eighties] (G. Borgese, G. Aulenti)," Casamica 7/8: 102–130.
- 2004. "Una Casa per Lavorare [A Home for Work] (Enzo Mari)," Casamica n. 1/2: 76–84.
- 2003. "Il Moderno in un Castello [Modernity in a Castle] (A. Bruno)," Casamica n. 7/8: 98-105.
- 2003. "Una storia Milanese [A Story of Milan]," Casamica n.1/2
- 2002. "Interni a Misura d'Uomo [Interiors Made for Men] (P. Pinto & B. Modenese)," Casamica Collection n.1: 16–25.
- 1995. "Tecnologia vernacolare [Vernacular Technology] (Marc Held)," VilleGiardini 306 (Settembre): 74–79.
- 1992. "Il Cuore Freddo dell'Avantgarde [The Cold Heart of the Avant-garde] (R. Meier)," VilleGiardini 274 (Ottobre): 48–53.
- 1991. "Interni per Signora [An Interior Designed for a Lady] (A. Giorgi)," Casa Vogue 226: 48–59.
- 1991. "Franco Maria Ricci," Casaviva XIX, n. 205: 131–37.
- 1986. "Una casa-finestra [A House as Window] (G. Aulenti)," Casa Vogue 180: 132–35.
- 1985. "Gae Aulenti: Renaissance," Vogue (May): 320–325.
- 1985. "Restructuration de Musee National d’Art Moderne, Centre Georges Pompidou, Paris [Restructuring the Museum of Modern Art, Pompidou Center, Paris] (G. Aulenti, P. Castiglioni, J. Rota)," Architecture d’Aujord hui (AA) 240 (September): 26–31.
- 1984. "Le high-tech en état de grace [High-Tech in a State of Grace] (T. Cordero)," Maison Française 382 (Novembre): 108–113.
- 1984. "Un sistema puntiforme: I muri forati di Gae Aulenti [A Point-Like System: the Perforated Walls of Gae Aulenti]," Casa Vogue 155: 278–89.
- 1983. "A Parigi, lo studio di un personaggio della moda: l’antro grigio del sapere [In Paris, the Studio of a Fashionable Personality: the Grey Cave of Knowledge] (Karl Lagerfeld)," Casa Vogue 138: 112–117.
- 1982. "Cor-ten Castle Rises from a Pond in a Verdant Paris Suburb (Marc Held)," AIA Journal 71, no. 10: 91–95.
- 1982. "Il castello di Marco Simone dove vive e lavora Laura Biagiotti [The Castle Marco Simone where Laura Biogiotti Lives and Works] (P. Pinto)," Casa Vogue 133: 318–37.
- 1982. "Il luogo ritrovato [A Place Rediscovered] (T. Cordero)," Harpers Gran Bazaar-Italia 5/6: 154–65.
- 1982. "Ville di Vico Magistretti [Villas by Vico Magistretti]," VilleGiardini (Dicembre): 10–19.
- 1982. "A Milano: La Galleria [The Milan Galleria] (G. Mengoni)," Abitare 201: 70–79.
- 1981. "Progettare un interno [Designing an Interior] (C. Dini)," Abitare 199/52: 59–64.
- 1981. "La brique en tout et pour tout [The Brick in Everything and for Everything] (G. Aulenti)," Maison Francaise 349: 100–104.
- 1980. "Avantgarde aus New York [The Avant-garde of New York] (R. Meier)," Architektur & Wohnen 4: 37–42.
- 1978. "Era un cementificio la visionaria casa-studio di Bofill [Bofill's Ingenious Home-Studio was a Cement Factory] (R. Bofill)," Casa Vogue 88: 172–77.
- 1975. "Linee orizzontali nella Bassa Emiliana [Horizontal Lines in Bassa Emiliana] (G. Aulenti)," Casa Vogue 50: 136–42.
- 1975. "Marmi, argenti, bronzi, all'ombra del Borromini [Marble, Silver, and Bronze in the Shadow of Borromini] (M. Chiari)," Casa Vogue 51: 40–45.
- 1972. "Emilio Pucci's Wide Grass-Terrace World (G. Aulenti)," House & Garden 268 (April): 158–60.
- 1972. "Una Casa che non Esiste [A House that Doesn't Exist] (Nanda Vigo)," Domus 507 (Febbraio): 25–32.
- 1971. "Nero da negativo nell'abitazione di un fotografo e di un'attrice [Negative Black in the Home of a Photographer and an Actress] (W. Rizzo and Elsa Martinelli)," Casa Vogue 6: 28–31.
- 1970. "L'Architetto una scelta difficile [The Architect Has a Difficult Choice to Make] (Griffini & Montagni)," Abitare 91 (Dicembre): 16–19.
- 1969. "Recuperato un vecchio rudere in un villagio della normandia [An Old Ruin in a Normandy Village is Reclaimed] (Alain Richard)," Abitare 74: 22–27.
- 1968. "Casa Coggi [The Coggi House] (J. Colombo)," Abitare 70: 5–7.
- 1968. "I muri di Luis Barragan [The Walls of Luis Barragan]," Domus 468 (Novembre): 2–4.
- 1968. "Per genitori e figli due settori separate ma unificati da un identico trattamento cromatico [For Parents and Children, Two Separate Spaces but United by Color] (Cini Boeri)," Abitare 62 (January–February): 7-15 + 28.
- 1966. "From Italy with Love and Splendor (BBPR)," Interiors CXXV, no. 10: 104–15.
- 1964. "Sistematzione dell’attico in un condominio ‘qualunque [Refurbishing an Attic in a Condominium] (V. Gregotti)," Abitare 31: 32–37.
- 1964. "Ampliamento e sistemazione di una villa sul lago [Expanding and Refurbishing a Villa on a Lake] (F. Mazzucchelli)," Abitare 28: 20–27.

=== Select Africa related publications ===
- 1995. "'My Mercedes Has Four Legs!' 'Traditional' as an Attribute of African Equestrian Cultures" (with Barry Hallen), in Horsemen of Africa: History, Iconography and Symbolism. Milan, Italy: Center for the study of African Archaeology, 49–64.
- 1994. "Motivi in evoluzione [The Evolution of Decorative Motifs]," in Annual Tessuti: 12–19.
- 1993. "The Technology of Transport along the Asian and African Silk Roads: Some Observations and Comparisons" (with Barry Hallen), in Historical Routes: a Patrimony to Safeguard, edited by M. Boriani and A. Cazzani. Milan, Italy: Dipartimento di Architettura, Politecnico di Milano & Edito da Guerini e Associati, 25–35.
- 1993. "National Arabian Horse Competitions in the Sultanate of Oman" (with Barry Hallen), The Arab Horse Society News (75th Jubilee issue) 81: 49.
- 1993. "Oman: la Rinascita del Cavallo Arabo [Oman: the Renaissance of the Arabian Horse]" (with Barry Hallen), Purosangue Arabo II, n. 3: 22–27.
- 1993. "Africa: Wall Surfaces Made Precious with Design and Colour in the Palaces of African Kings" (coauthored with Barry Hallen), Casa Vogue 249: 110–115.
- 1992. "Citta di seta, abiti d'oro [Cities of Silk, Raiment's of Gold]," Annual Tessuti: 20–27.
- 1991. "Il Tesoro d'Africa [The Treasure of Africa]," Lei 167: 60–67.
- 1991. "Le Mille e Un Cavallo nel Sultanato dell'Oman [A Thousand and One Horses: In the Sultanate of Oman]" (with Barry Hallen), Cavallo VI, n. 59: 48–59.
- 1991. "Nigeria: Calabar en Faste [Nigeria: Calabar during Festivities]" (with Barry Hallen), Grands Reportages 111: 102–112.
- 1989. "Nigeria: I Dragoni di Kano [Nigeria: The Dragoons of Kano]" (with Barry Hallen), Cavallo IV, no. 37: 20–32.
- 1989. "Les Rois Cousus d'Or [Kings Draped in Gold]" (with Barry Hallen), Grands Reportages, 94: 34–42.
- 1988. "In the Kingdoms of African Princes" (with Barry Hallen), Ambiente 7-8/88: 120–128.
- 1988. "Afro-Brazilian Mosques in West Africa" (with Barry Hallen), Mimar: Architecture in Development 29: 16–23.
- 1988. "Moscheen: Brasilianischer Barock in Westafrika [Mosques: Brazilian Baroque in West Africa]" (with Barry Hallen), Hauser 4, no. 88: 162–68.
- 1988. "Il Bel Paese che l'Italia Sporca [Nigeria: The Beautiful Country that Italy has Polluted]" (with Barry Hallen), Corriere della Sera 28: 64–89.
- 1988. "Africa: Cottons of Colour" (with Barry Hallen), L'Uomo Vogue 185: 211.
- 1986. "Nigeria, le regge dei re [Nigeria: Palaces of Kings]," Abitare 243: 242–53.
- 1985. "Moschee d’Africa [Mosques of Africa]," Domus 658: 30–37.
- 1981. "Psichiatria Africana: Rito e Terapia [African Psychiatry: Rite and Therapy], Scienze 2: 52-57.
- 1982. "Nomadi e Sedendari [Nomads and the Sedentary] (with Ugo Fabietti)," Scienze 5/6: 58–65.
- 1978. "Dakar: Psichiatria 'Tradizionale' e Psichiatria d'Importazione [Dakar: 'Traditional' Psychiatry and Imported Psychiatry]," Hinterland 1, no. 3 (May–June): 22–23.
