= Sciuto =

Sciuto is an Italian surname meaning "thin". Notable people with the surname include:

== People ==
- Alan Sciuto (born 1988), former racing driver
- Donatella Sciuto (born 1962), Italian electronic engineer and academic administrator
- Lucien Sciuto (1868–1947), Jewish journalist
- Pablo Sciuto (born 1979), Uruguayan singer
- Tony Sciuto (born 1952), American musician

== Fictional characters ==
- Abby Sciuto, a prominent fictional character in the American television series NCIS
