= Giovanni Azzone =

Italian engineer

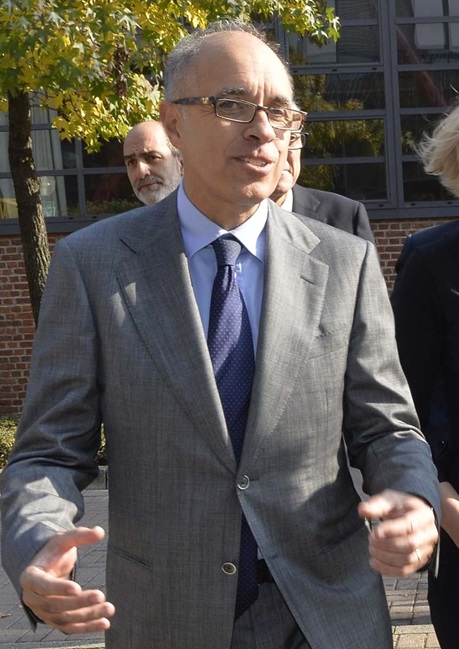
Azzone in October 2015

Giovanni Azzone (born in Milan, on 24 November 1962) is an Italian engineer and academic, rector of the Polytechnic University of Milan between 2010 and 2016.

In 1986 Azzone graduated in industrial engineering from the Polytechnic University of Milan.

On 25 May 2016 he became a member of the board of directors of Poste italiane, the Italian postal service provider.

== Principal publications ==
- Azzone, G., 1994, Innovare il sistema di controllo di gestione, Etaslibri, Milano.
- Azzone, G., Bertelè, U., Noci, G., 1997, L'ambiente come vantaggio competitivo: un'opportunità per le imprese, Etaslibri, Milano.
- Azzone, G., Bertelè, U., 1998, Valutare l'innovazione, Etaslibri, Milano.
- Azzone, G., 2000, La gestione ambientale degli aeroporti, IPA, Milano.
- Azzone, G., Bertelè, U., 2002, L'impresa – sistemi di governo, valutazione e controllo, Etaslibri, Milano
- Azzone, G., 2006, Sistemi di controllo di gestione, Etaslibri, Milano.
- Azzone, G., 2007, Il controllo di gestione nelle amministrazioni pubbliche, Etaslibri, Milano.
- Azzone, G., Campedelli, B., Varasio, E., 2011, Il sistema di programmazione e controllo negli atenei, Il Mulino, Bologna.
