= Artinite =

Hydrated basic magnesium carbonate mineral

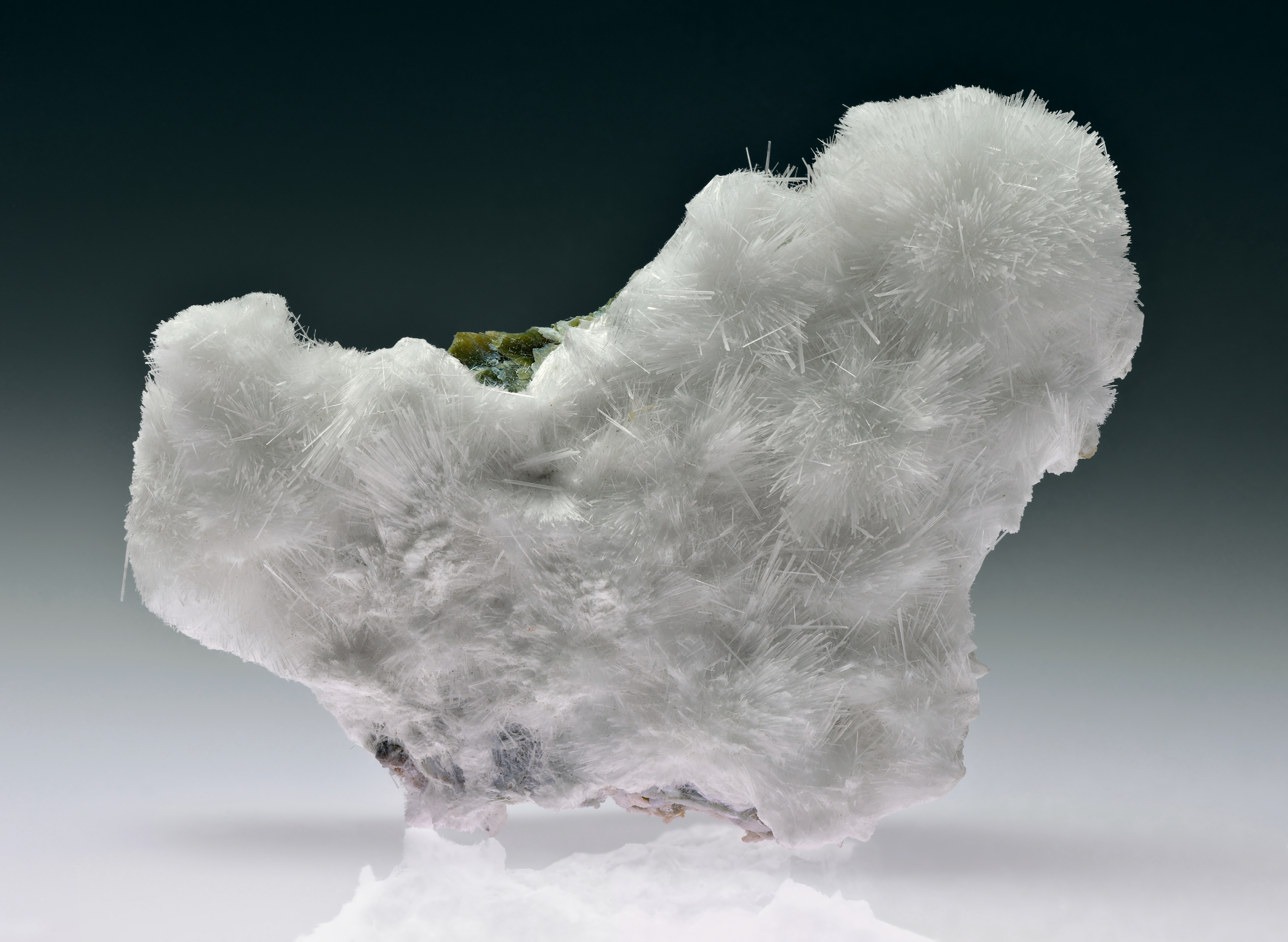
- Artinite from New Idria District, California

General
- Category: Carbonate mineral
- Formula: Mg_{2}(CO_{3})(OH)_{2}·3H_{2}O
- IMA symbol: Art
- Strunz classification: 5.DA.10
- Crystal system: Monoclinic
- Crystal class: Prismatic (2/m) (same H-M symbol)
- Space group: C2/m
- Unit cell: a = 16.56, b = 3.15 c = 6.22 [Å]; β = 99.15°; Z = 2

Identification
- Color: White
- Crystal habit: Acicular crystals, fibrous veinlets, botryoidal crusts, and spherical aggregates
- Cleavage: On {100} perfect; on {001} good.
- Mohs scale hardness: 2.5
- Luster: Vitreous, silky
- Streak: White
- Diaphaneity: Transparent
- Specific gravity: 2.01 – 2.03
- Optical properties: Biaxial (−)
- Refractive index: nα = 1.488 – 1.489 nβ = 1.533 – 1.534 nγ = 1.556 – 1.557
- Birefringence: δ = 0.068

Artinite is a hydrated basic magnesium carbonate mineral with formula: Mg_{2}(CO_{3})(OH)_{2}·3H_{2}O. It forms white silky monoclinic prismatic crystals that are often in radial arrays or encrustations. It has a Mohs hardness of 2.5 and a specific gravity of 2.

It occurs in low-temperature hydrothermal veins and in serpentinized ultramafic rocks. Associated minerals include brucite, hydromagnesite, pyroaurite, chrysotile, aragonite, calcite, dolomite and magnesite.

It was first reported in 1902 in Lombardy, Italy. It was named for Italian mineralogist, Ettore Artini (1866–1928).

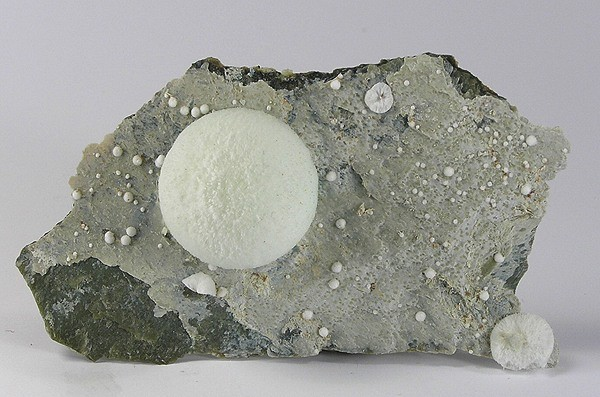
Artinite sometimes forms balls of radiating, fibrous crystals. Specimen from New Idria district, California US. Size: 9.2 x 5.2 x 1.5 cm.
