= Ettore Artini =

Italian mineralogist (1866–1928)

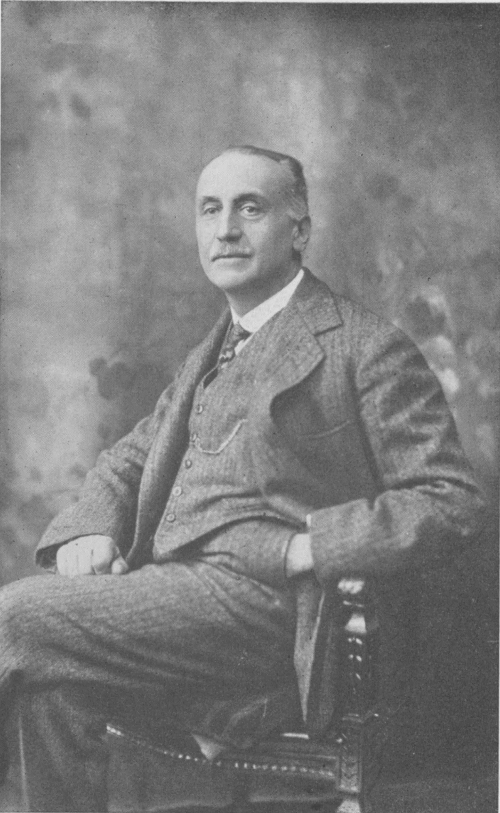
- Ettore Artini
- Born: 29 August 1866; Milan, Italy
- Died: 7 March 1928 (aged 61); Milan, Italy
- Education: University of Florence
- Occupation: Mineralogist
- Children: Maria Artini
- Scientific career
- Fields: Mineralogy

Ettore Artini (29 August 1866 – 7 March 1928) was an Italian mineralogist, scientist, researcher and university professor. He discovered and described the minerals: bavenite, bazzite, and brugnatellite.

== Early life and education ==
He was born in Milan, Italy on 29 August 1866. He completed his Ph.D. in science at the University of Florence in 1887.

== Career ==
He became an assistant at the Mining Institute of the University of Pavia where he taught mining to his students until 1893. In 1911, he became a professor of mineralogy at a technical high school in Milan.

He served as the President of the Italian Society of Natural Sciences and the Italian Geological Society, and organized the Congress of Italian Naturalists in Milan in 1906.

The mineral Artinite is named after him.

Artini died in Milan, Italy on 7 March 1928.

His daughter Maria Artini was notable for being the first female graduate in electrical engineering in Italy.

== Bibliography ==
He is the author of a number of notable books:

- Le rocce, concetti e nozioni di petrografia, con 134 figure nel testo e 32 tavole
- Lezioni di mineralogia e materiali da costruzione, tenute presso il R. Istituto tecnico superiore di Milano

== See also ==
- List of minerals named after people
