= Gaetanina Calvi =

Italian engineer

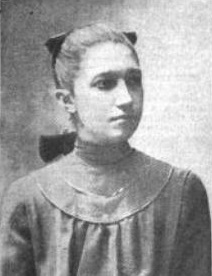
- Born: 1887; Milan
- Died: 1964 (aged 76–77); Carate Brianza
- Alma mater: Polytechnic University of Milan
- Occupation: Engineer

Gaetanina Calvi (1887 Milan – 1964 Carate Brianza) was an Italian engineer. She was the first woman to graduate from Polytechnic University of Milan, in 1913, and second in Italy after Emma Strada.

== Early life and education ==
She graduated from the Isep Parini high school. In the academic year 1908/1909, she enrolled in civil engineering at the Polytechnic University of Milan. She graduated in 1913 with 85/100.

== Career ==
Calvi worked for the engineers Gardella and Martini in Milan. In 1925 Calvi designed a new wing of the L'Istituto dei Ciechi (Institute for the Blind) in Milan, in collaboration with the architect Mario Faravelli.

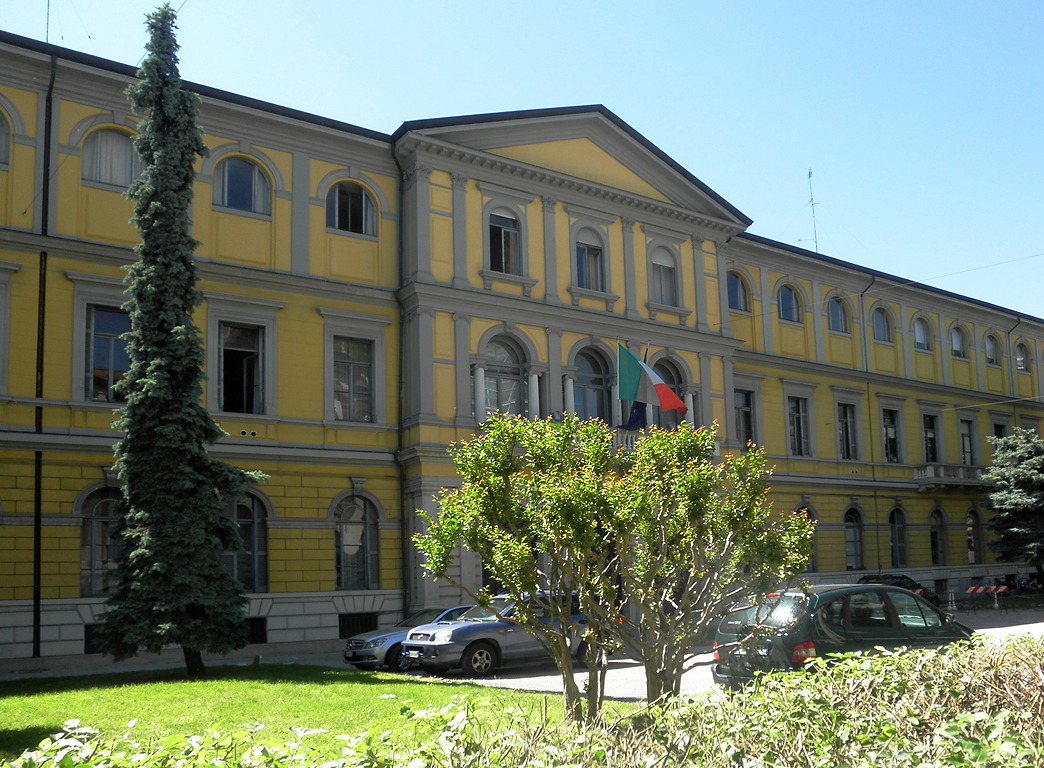
L'Istituto dei Ciechi, Milan

She then taught mathematics at the Istituto dei Ciechi and in 1933 became a benefactor of the Institute’s Group Home with a large bequest following the death of her mother.

In 1940, with the entry of Italy into the Second World War, Calvi retired from teaching in Milan but took child students in mathematics, Latin and Italian from the local population of farmers or labourers who worked in the spinning mills of the River Lambro, near her home in Costa Lambro, a village in Carate Brianza. She was known as Countess Calvi and "those who could afford to paid a small amount; those who could not paid for their lessons with a few hens."

She worked as a freelancer engineer and teacher until her death, in Carate Brianza in 1964.

== See also ==
- List of women who obtained doctoral degrees before 1800
