= Köln International School of Design =

Art school in Germany

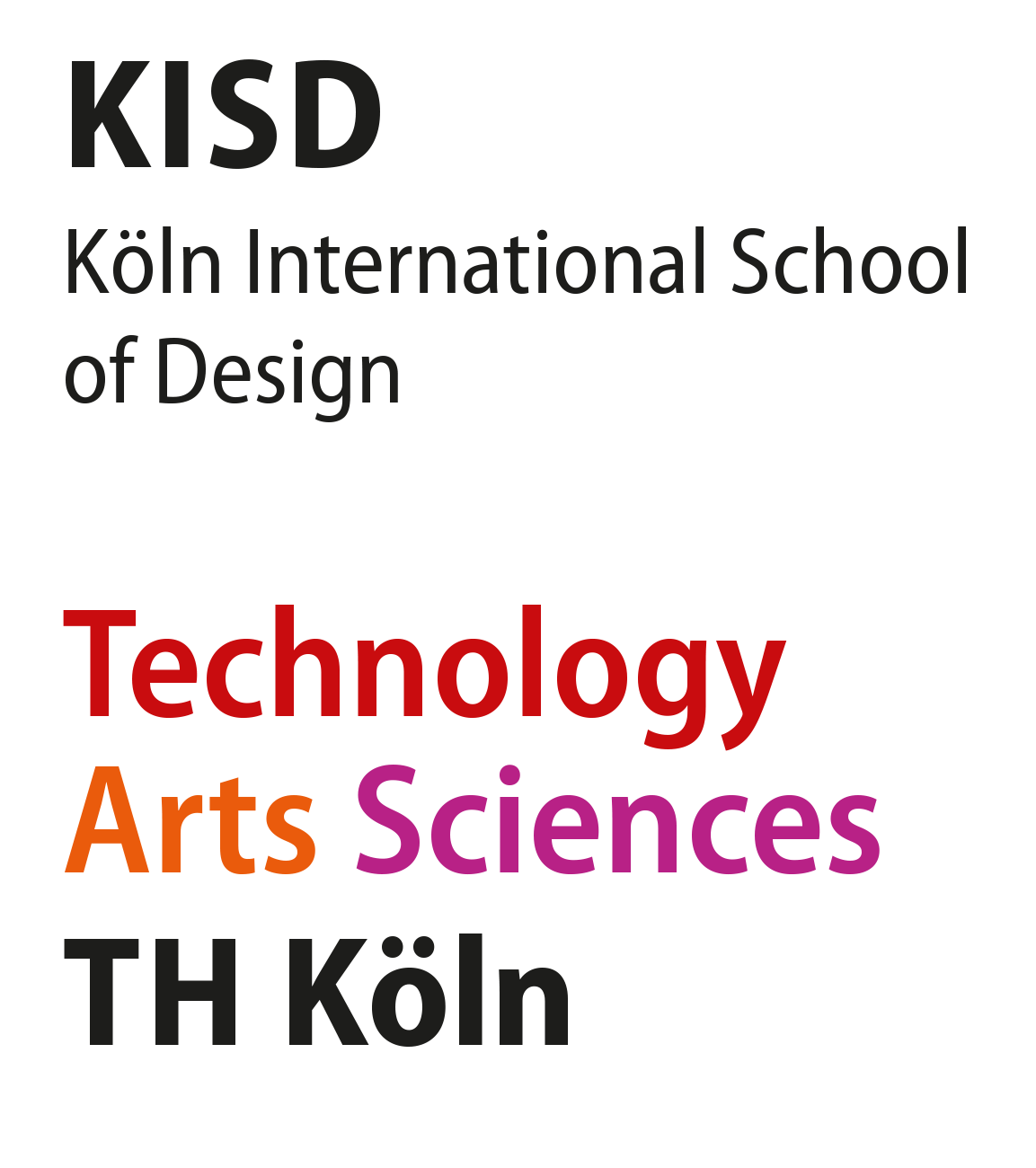
- Former names: Cologne Model of Design Education
- Type: University department
- Established: 1991
- Parent institution: Cologne University of Applied Sciences
- Director: Andreas Wrede
- Academic staff: 35
- Students: 481
- Location: Ubierring 40, 50678, Cologne, North Rhine-Westphalia, Germany; 50°55′17″N 6°57′48″E
- Website: http://www.kisd.de/

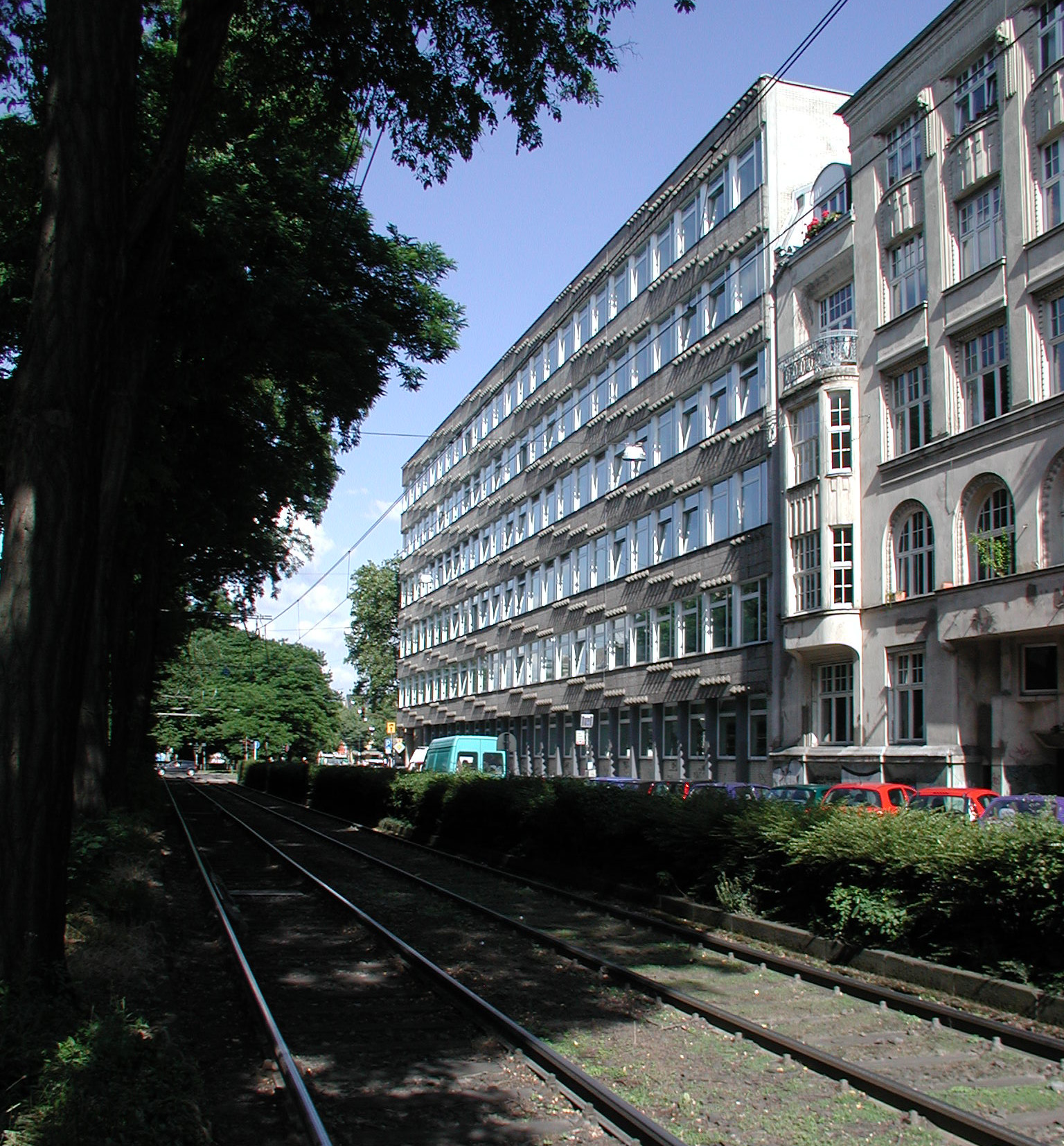
Köln International School of Design on Ubierring

The Köln International School of Design (in short: KISD) is an institution of the Cologne University of Applied Sciences (Technische Hochschule Köln or TH Köln) and offers an interdisciplinary study program in the field of design. In 1991, the school was established and named Cologne Model of Design Education. In 2002, the school was renamed to Köln International School of Design.

== History ==
With the establishment of TH Köln (Technische Hochschule Köln ) in 1971 the Kölner Werkschulen were incorporated as a department of "Art and Design" in this university of applied sciences. In 1991 the course »free art« was abandoned and the design degree program was transferred into the so-called "Cologne Model", which was mainly characterized by a project-oriented teaching and the abolition of traditional disciplines and semester structures. The study program in the Department of Design first time involved teaching areas such as Service Design, Design Management, Design and Gender or Ecology and Design. Since 2008 the Diploma Study Programs at TH Köln ran out. New registrations are made only for the Bachelor and master's degree Programs. In 2002, the organization was abandoned in departments as part of a high school internal reform. Since then KISD forms with the CICS - Institute for Conservation Sciences and the Cologne Game Lab (since 2013) the Faculty of Cultural Studies.

== Courses ==
KISD offers the 7-semester Bachelor and 3-semester Master program "Integrated Design". In addition it takes part in the Master of European Design-program. 75% of all courses in the Bachelor program are held in English, the Master program is completely in English.

Key aspects of the areas of expertise are e.g. healthcare, mobility, work environment, knowledge and educational organisations. This twelve areas of expertise are the focus of the project-oriented design programme. Students have to enroll for at least ten areas of expertise and can develop their own focus:

- Image and Motion
- Identity and Design
- Design for Manufacturing
- Design Concepts
- Design and Economy
- Design Theory and Research
- Gender and Design
- Interface Design and Interaction Design
- Ecology and Design
- Production Technology
- Service Design
- Typography and Layout
