= Maria Artini =

Italian engineer (1894–1951)

- Born: 1894; Milan, Italy
- Died: 2 August 1951 (aged 56–57)
- Education: Polytechnic University of Milan
- Occupation: Engineer
- Known for: First female graduate in electrical engineering in Italy
- Spouse: Leonardo Maggi
- Father: Ettore Artini

Maria Artini (1894 – 2 August 1951) was an Italian engineer, the first female university graduate in electrical engineering in Italy and the second female graduate of the Milan Polytechnic.

== Early life and education ==
Artini was born in Milan, Italy, in 1894. She was the daughter of Ettore Artini, who was a director of the Civic Museum of Natural History in Milan and professor of mineralogy at the Polytechnic University of Milan where Maria enrolled In 1912. In 1918, she graduated in electrical engineering with a grade of 90/100 becoming the first female electrical engineer in Italy, and only the second woman to graduate from the Polytechnic (after Gaetanina Calvi did so in 1913).

== Career ==
One year after graduation, Artini began a job at Edison, a Milan-based energy company. There she was promoted to managerial roles and helped to design and construct the country's first very high-voltage (130 kV) power line, in the Brugherio-Parma region. According to Edison, "from 1936 to 1946 she organized and directed Edison's statistics office, later returning [as an executive] to deal with very high voltage [the new 200 kW] power lines."

In an effort to help other women in technical fields, in 1948 Artini suggested the formation of an association of female professionals and even organized a series of meetings with her Milanese and Turin colleagues. Although she died before it could be realized, the Associazione Italiana Donne Ingegnere e Architetto 'Italian Association of Women Engineers and Architects' (AIDIA) was born on January 26, 1957, founded by engineer Emma Strada (its first president), Anna E. Armor, Adele Racheli and the architect Vittoria Ilardi. According to Altomare, the association continues today and "boasts a path studded with successes, awards and honors." Artini is still credited for her "brilliant idea" of forming the association.

== Personal life ==
Artini married Leonardo Maggi who is known to have been a benefactor of Milan's Institute of the Blind. The Institute's museum houses a photograph of Artini in its collection.

Maria Artini died on 2 August 1951, at the age of 57.
