= Antonio Pedotti =

Italian scientist, bioengineer and researcher

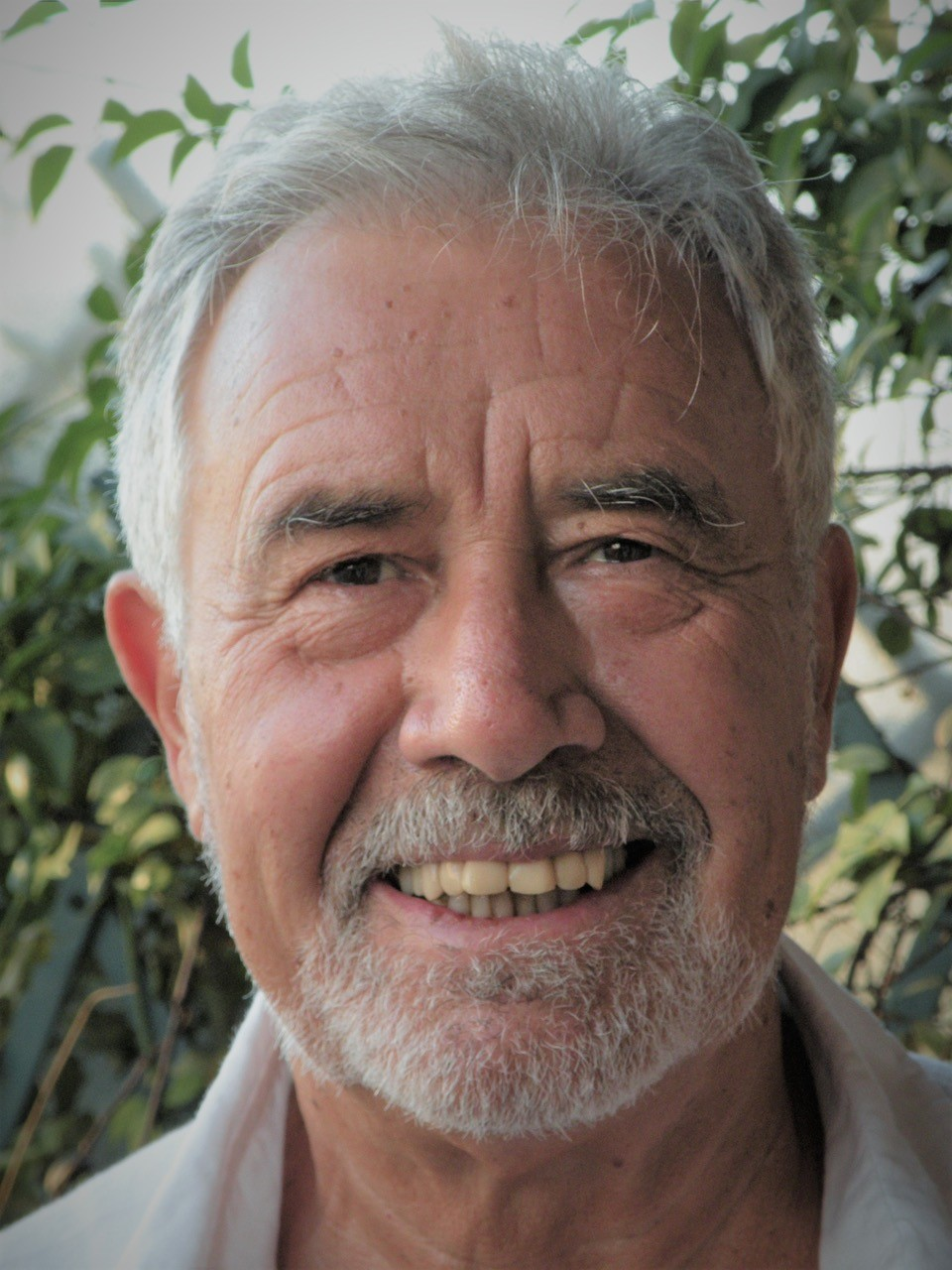
- Born: Brenta, Lombardy
- Occupations: Scientist, bioengineer and researcher

Antonio Pedotti is an Italian scientist, bioengineer and researcher. He is Emeritus Professor of Biomedical Technologies at the Polytechnic University of Milan where he has been chair of the Bioengineering Department, member of the Academic Senate and Director of the Biomedical Technologies Laboratory. He is the former director of the Bioengineering Center of Milan cofounded by the Politecnico and the Scientific Medical Institute Don Gnocchi.

Pedotti has authored over 300 publications including scientific papers, books and patents regarding the interdisciplinary research on IT, biological systems and medicine. He has worked on simulation of biological system, signal processing, 3D multimodal imaging and multimedia technologies to improve knowledge and to develop techniques and tools that address critical medical needs especially for movement analysis and rehabilitation, cardiovascular monitoring, respiratory function and radiotherapy.

Pedotti has been an editorial board member of several magazines and an editor of the Studies in Health Technology and Informatics series.

== Career ==
Pedotti received his Dr. Eng. degree in electrical engineering from the Politecnico di Milano where from 1970 to 1981 he taught as associate professor of Automatic Control, and later as Full Professor of Bioengineering and has been visiting professor at the University of California, Berkeley. From 1979 to 1990 he was designated national representative in the COMAC-BME of the European Union.

In 1984 he was appointed member of the Superior Health Council by the Italian Ministry of Health and from 1987 to 1995 scientific director of the scientific health care Institute don Gnocchi Fnd. In 1986 he cofounded Bioengineering Technology and Systems (BTS) Company he served as scientific advisor. In 2000 he contributed to establish the Italian National Center of Oncological Hadrontheraphy (CNAO), a cancer centre specializing in translational research and Hadrontherapy with protons and carbon ions, where he is serving as member of the Board of Governors since the beginning.

Pedotti has been Chairman of the European Society of Engineering and Medicine, the International Society of Electrophysiology and Kinesiology, President of the Italian Society for Movement Analysis in Clinics and of the Italian Association of the Medical and Biological Engineering.

Pedotti is member of the Istituto Lombardo Accademia di Scienze e Lettere and of the International Academy of Medical and Biological Engineering.

== Research ==
Pedotti's research has been focused on movement science, motor disorders and rehabilitation, cardiovascular and pulmonary diseases and cancer treatment.

=== Pedotti diagrams and Elite for 3D analysis of movement ===
Pedotti has worked on new methods and technologies for the analysis of complex movements to investigate neuroscience areas such as neuromotor control, brain plasticity and learning. He has researched on the development of such innovations for applications in neurological disorders, orthopedics, rehabilitation, ergonomics and optimization of motor performances. He developed the Pedotti diagrams of gait and the computer vision Elite for 3D analysis of movement in this context. His developments are used in clinical practice and have also been installed in the space platforms MIR and ISS to investigate astronaut motor performances in microgravity.

=== Functional rehabilitation and recovery of disabled people ===
Pedotti has also worked on creating technical aids and devices for functional rehabilitation and recovery of disabled people including neuroprosthesis and brain-computer interface and the service for information and evaluation of technical aids (SIVA).

=== Cardiovascular research ===
In the field of cardiovascular research, Pedotti contributed to the development of new algorithms and technologies for continuous monitoring and processing of BP and HR signals in order to investigate the baroreflex control and its role in hypertension.

=== Cancer research ===
Pedotti has conducted oncological research centering on radiomics, sensors and robotics, to improve methods and technologies for patient positioning and computer aided tumor targeting in radiotherapy and hadrontherapy with protons and carbon ions.

=== Optoelectronic Pletismography ===
In the context of pneumology and respiratory diseases, Pedotti is one of the inventors of the Optoelectronic Pletismography, which is a method to evaluate ventilation through an external measurement of the chest wall surface motion. He also contributed in the improvement of forced oscillation technique (FOT) for evaluating the respiratory system resistance and reactance during spontaneous ventilation and mechanical ventilation.

== Bibliography ==
=== Selected books ===
- Restoration of Walking for Paraplegics: Recent Advancements and Trends (1992) ISBN 978-9051990942
- Electrophysiological Kinesiology (1993) ISBN 978-9051990959
- Neuroprosthetics: from Basic Research to Clinical Applications (1996) ISBN 978-3540610847
- Methodology and clinical applications of blood pressure and heart rate analysis(1999) ISBN 978-90-5199-436-0.
- Mechanics of Breathing: New Insights from New Technologies (2014) ISBN 978-8847056473

=== Selected articles ===
- Pedotti A., "Simple equipment used in clinical practice for evaluation of locomotion", IEEE Trans. Biomed. Eng., 24(5): 456–461, September 1977.
- Pedotti A., Krishnan V.V., Stark L., "Optimization of muscle-force sequencing in human locomotion", Mathematical Biosciences, 38, pp. 57–76, 1978.
- Mancia G., Ferrari A., Gregorini L., Parati G., Pomidossi G., Bertinieri G., Grassi G., Di Rienzo M., Pedotti A., Zanchetti A., "Blood pressure and heart rate variabilities in normotensive and hypertensive human beings", Circ. Res., 53(1): 96–104, July 1983.
- Ferrigno G., Pedotti A., "ELITE: a digital dedicated hardware system for movement analysis via real-time TV signal processing", IEEE Trans. Biomed. Eng., 32(11): 943–950, November 1985.
- Fogassi L., Gallese V., di Pellegrino G., Fadiga L., Gentilucci M., Luppino G., Matelli M., Pedotti A., Rizzolatti G., "Space coding by premotor cortex", Exp. Brain Res., 89(3): 686–690, 1992.
- Baroni G., Ferrigno G., Orecchia R., Pedotti A., “Real-time three-dimensional motion analysis for patient positioning verification”, Radiother. Oncol., 54(1): 21–27, January 2000.
- Mouchnino L., Aurenty R., Massion J., Pedotti A., "Coordination between equilibrium and head-trunk orientation during leg movement: a new strategy build up by training", J. Neurophysiol., 67(6): 1587–1598, June 1992.
- Cala S.J., Kenyon C.M., Ferrigno G., Carnevali P., Aliverti A., Pedotti A., Macklem P.T., Rochester D.F., “Chest wall and lung volume estimation by optical reflectance motion analysis”, J. Appl. Physiol., 81(6): 2680–2689, December 1996
- Ferrarin M., Rizzone M., Bergamasco B., Lanotte M., Recalcati M., Pedotti A., Lopiano L., "Effects of bilateral subthalamic stimulation on gait kinematics and kinetics in Parkinson's disease", Exp. Brain Res., 160(4): 517–527, January 2005
- Pedotti A., "A study of motor coordination and neuromuscular activities in human locomotion", Biol. Cybern., 26(1): 53–62, March 1977.
