= POLIMI Graduate School of Management =

Graduate school of business in Italy

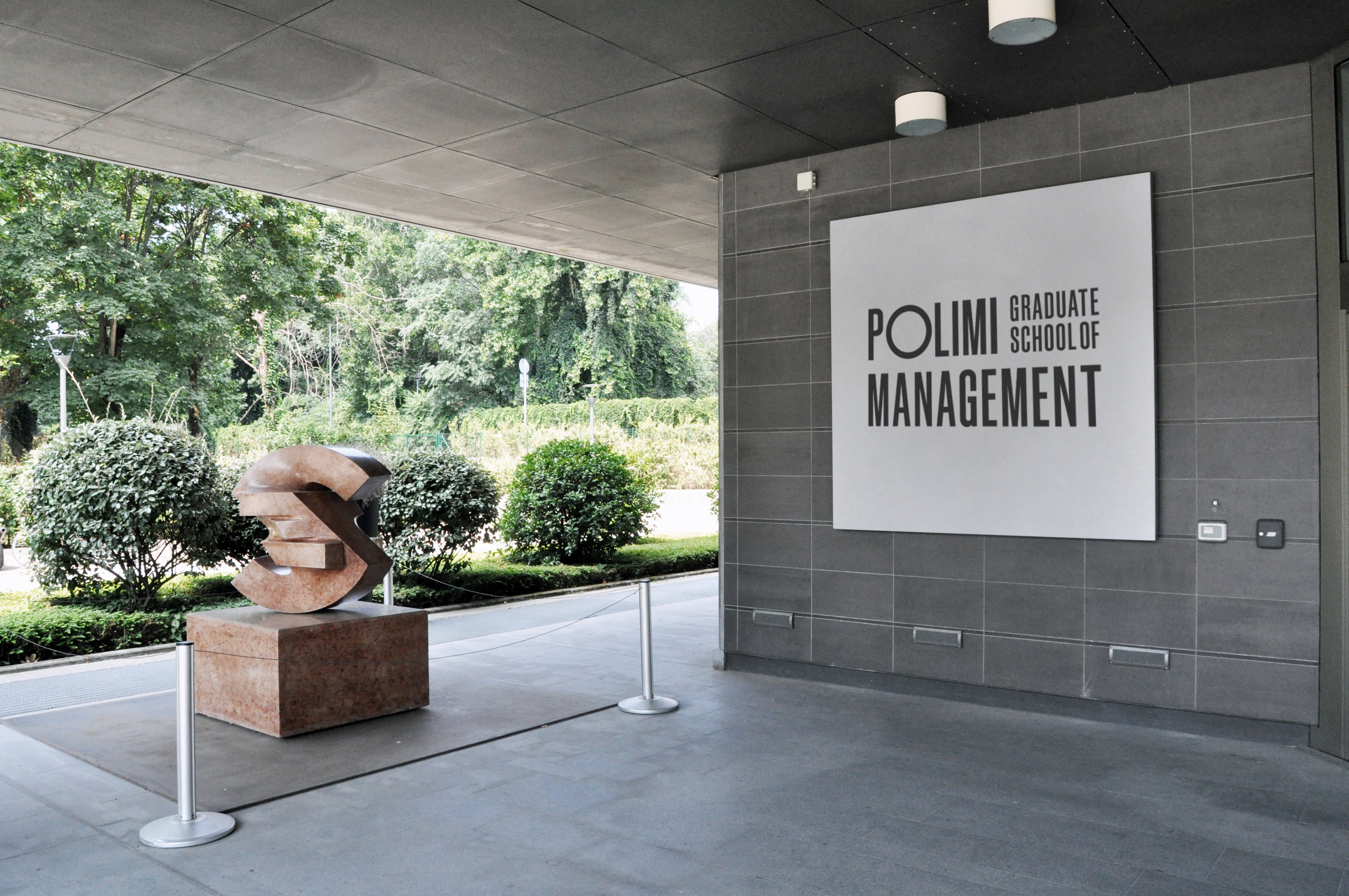
- Former name: MIP Politecnico di Milano Graduate School of Business
- Type: Not-for-profit, private business school
- Established: 1979; 47 years ago
- Parent institution: Polytechnic University of Milan
- Accreditation: Triple accreditation
- President: Vittorio Chiesa
- Dean: Federico Frattini
- Location: Milan; Rome; Pieve del Grappa, Italy
- Website: www.gsom.polimi.it/en

POLIMI Graduate School of Management (POLIMI GSoM), formerly MIP Politecnico di Milano Graduate School of Business, is a not-for-profit private business school in Italy. Founded in 1979, it forms part of the School of Management of the Politecnico di Milano. The graduate school operates as a consortium company involving the university, Assolombarda and Italian and multinational companies.

== History ==
The institution originated in 1979 as the Master in Ingegneria della Produzione ("Master in Production Engineering"), from which the acronym MIP was derived. The programme was created to combine engineering education with economic, organisational and production-management knowledge.

In 1986, MIP was transformed into a consortium between the Politecnico di Milano, Italian institutions and public and private industrial groups.

The Politecnico di Milano formally established its School of Management in 2003. The School of Management brought together MIP, founded in 1979, and the Department of Management Engineering (DIG), established in 1990.

The school received B Corp certification in August 2020. In April 2021, the School of Management obtained AACSB accreditation, completing the three accreditations commonly known as the "Triple Crown".

In May 2022, MIP Politecnico di Milano Graduate School of Business changed its name to POLIMI Graduate School of Management. The school stated that the new name better represented its relationship with the Politecnico di Milano and its broader management-education portfolio, which had expanded beyond the production-engineering focus reflected in the MIP acronym.

== Organisation and governance ==
POLIMI Graduate School of Management is one of the two constituent entities of the Politecnico di Milano School of Management. The other is DIG, the university's Department of Management Engineering. The department is primarily responsible for academic research and university degree programmes, while POLIMI GSoM focuses on postgraduate and executive management education.

According to AACSB, POLIMI GSoM is a not-for-profit private company in the legal form of a consortium company with share capital. Its shareholders include the Politecnico di Milano, Assolombarda and 22 Italian and multinational companies. The school's own website describes the organisation as a non-profit consortium joint-stock company.

The School of Management has an international Advisory Board with representatives from business, academia and institutions. POLIMI GSoM is governed by a board of directors chaired by Vittorio Chiesa, while Federico Frattini serves as Dean.

=== Selected former and current leaders ===
The school has generally used the titles President or Chairman and Dean, rather than chief executive officer, for its principal leadership roles.

Name	Role	Period
Umberto Bertelè	President of MIP	2004–2011; honorary president from 2011
Gianluca Spina	Director; later President and Dean	Director from 2001; President and Dean from 2011 to 2015
Andrea Sianesi	Dean and President of the Board	2015–2019
Vittorio Chiesa	President and Chairman of the Board	Current
Federico Frattini	Dean	Since 2020

Gianluca Spina, a professor of business and supply-chain management, was associated with MIP's internationalisation and its entry into the Financial Times business-school rankings. Following his death in 2015, the Associazione Gianluca Spina was created to support scholarships and educational initiatives connected with management engineering and the graduate school.

== Programmes ==
The school offers postgraduate and executive education, including MBA and Executive MBA programmes, specialised master's degrees, open-enrolment executive courses, customised programmes for organisations and public-administration education.

The school also offers a Doctorate in Business Administration (DBA). The Fall 2026 edition is described as a part-time, English-language programme delivered mainly through distance learning, with a duration of 29 to 36 months.

== Research and knowledge transfer ==
POLIMI Graduate School of Management operates within the research ecosystem of the Politecnico di Milano School of Management. Research covers management, applied economics and industrial engineering and is organised through cross-disciplinary research areas, Knowledge Centers and Research Platforms developed with companies and institutions.

The School of Management's applied-research activities include the Digital Innovation Observatories, founded within the university in 1999. The observatories examine the organisational, economic and technological effects of digital innovation.

In the Financial Times Research Insights Ranking 2025, the School of Management was ranked 31st worldwide for research impact. It was also placed second worldwide for the share of research related to the United Nations Sustainable Development Goals.

== Digital learning ==
The school developed FLEXA, a personalised digital-learning platform created with Microsoft and based on Microsoft Azure and artificial-intelligence technologies. The platform was designed to assess users' skills and recommend personalised learning resources.

AACSB cited FLEXA as part of the digital infrastructure that enabled the school to move teaching online during the COVID-19 pandemic. In 2021, the platform was made available beyond enrolled students as a free digital mentor.

== International memberships and collaborations ==
The School of Management lists memberships in international organisations including AACSB International, EFMD, the Association of MBAs, the Business Graduates Association, the EMBA Council, the Global Business School Network, CLADEA, the Alliance of Chinese and European Business Schools and the Principles for Responsible Management Education.

The International Master in Luxury Management is offered jointly with NEOMA Business School. In 2025, Bulgari, Ferrari and Louis Vuitton became corporate partners of the programme.

The school participates in a triple-degree programme in management, finance and technology with Emlyon Business School and Bayes Business School.

In 2025, POLIMI GSoM and Durham University Business School announced a joint Executive MBA focused on responsible leadership, sustainability and industry engagement.

== Sustainability and social impact ==
In addition to receiving B Corp certification in 2020, the School of Management completed the Business School Impact System assessment and received the BSIS label in 2024. The EFMD assessment examines a business school's educational, economic, societal and intellectual impact on its region and stakeholders.

In 2026, the School of Management was placed at Level 5, described as "Pioneering", in the Positive Impact Rating, a student-based assessment of business schools' societal impact. It was one of 12 institutions placed at that level and the only Italian institution in the group.

The school and the Associazione Gianluca Spina also organise Leave Your Mark, through which alumni, faculty and professionals provide pro bono management support to nonprofit organisations.

== Accreditations and rankings ==
The Politecnico di Milano School of Management received EQUIS accreditation in 2007, AMBA accreditation for its MBA and Executive MBA programmes in 2013, and AACSB accreditation in 2021. The combination of the three is known as Triple Crown accreditation.

The school has appeared in several Financial Times rankings, including:

- Financial Times European Business School Ranking 2025 – 35th in Europe
- Financial Times Online MBA Ranking 2026 – 11th worldwide and 7th in Europe for the International Flex online MBA
- Financial Times Global MBA Ranking 2026 – 90th worldwide and 29th in Europe for the Global MBA
- Financial Times Executive MBA Ranking 2025 – 77th worldwide and 40th in Europe for the Executive MBA
- Financial Times Masters in Management Ranking 2025 – 51st worldwide and 42nd in Europe for the MSc in Management Engineering
- Financial Times Executive Education Ranking 2026 – 43rd worldwide for open programmes and 41st worldwide for custom programmes

In the QS rankings published for 2026, the school's Full-Time MBA was placed 65th worldwide and 25th in Europe. Its International Flex online programme was ranked 12th worldwide and 6th in Europe, the Middle East and Africa, while the International Master in Digital Supply Chain Management was ranked 11th worldwide.

== Campuses ==
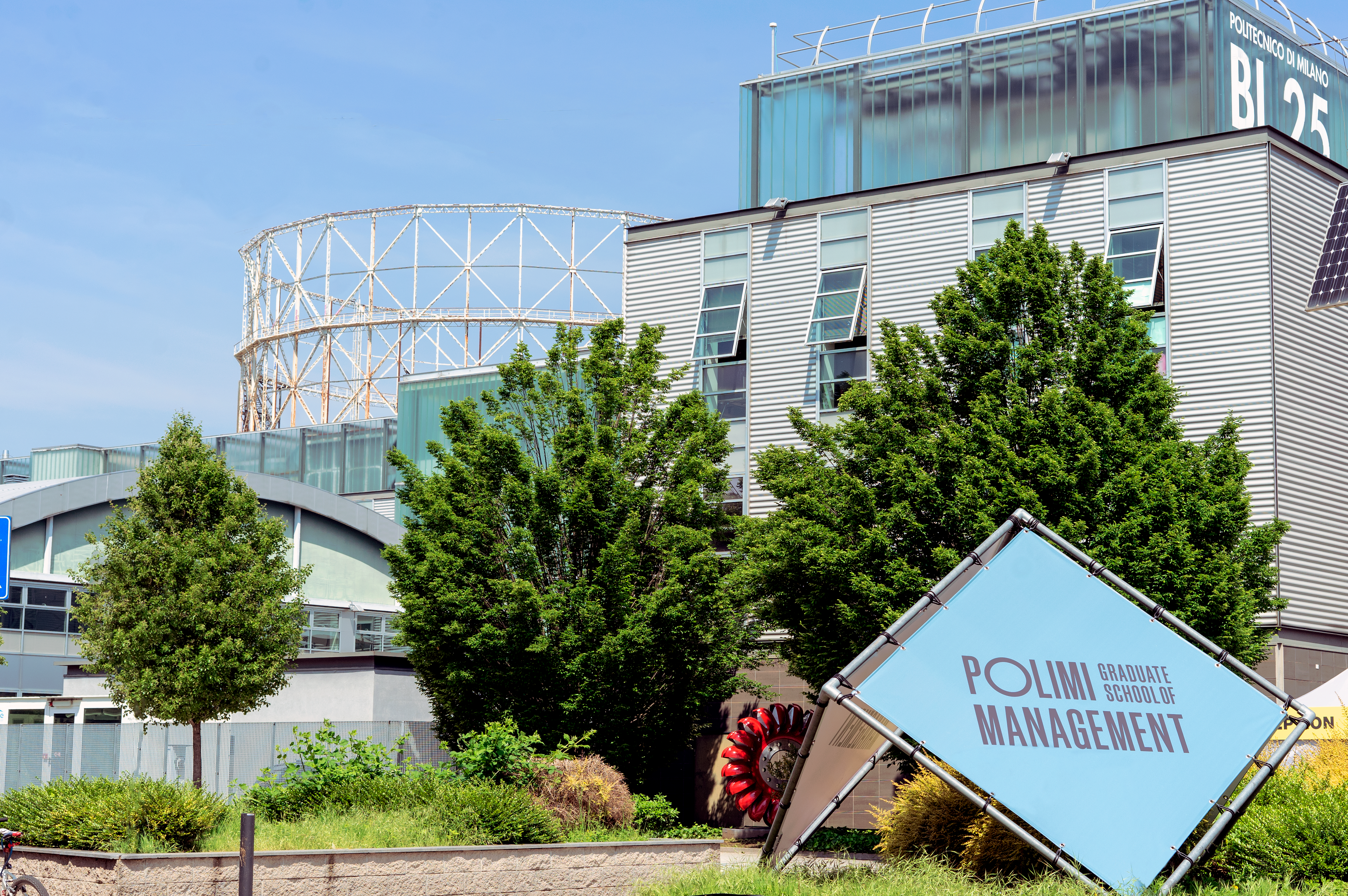
Bovisa Campus

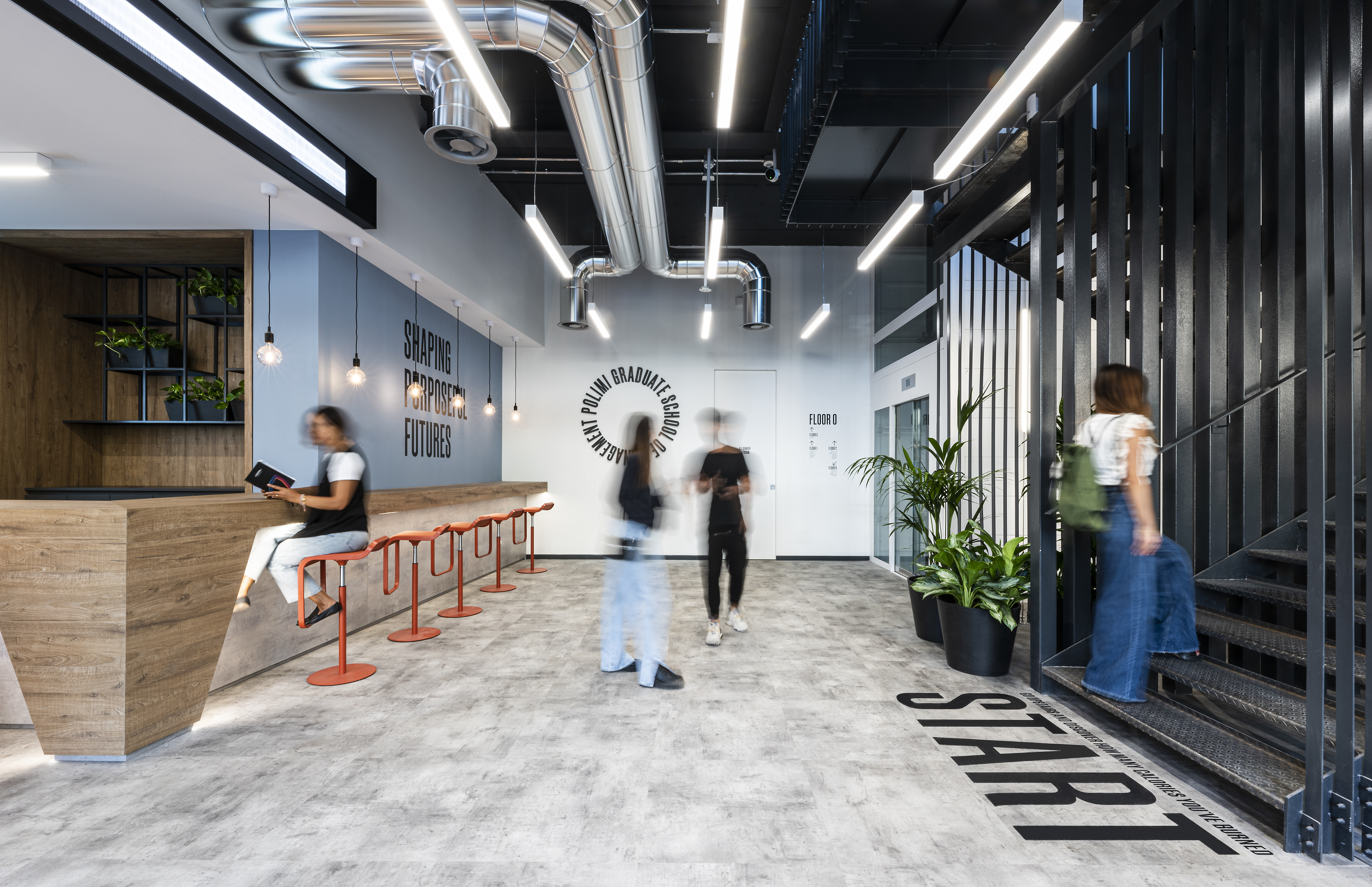
Navigli Campus

POLIMI Graduate School of Management operates in Milan and has developed educational activities with partner institutions in the Lazio and Veneto regions.

=== Milan – Bovisa Campus ===
The Bovisa Campus has housed the school since 2009. The Bovisa-Goccia area is part of an urban-regeneration programme involving the Municipality of Milan and the Politecnico di Milano.

=== Milan – Navigli Campus ===
The school opened an additional campus in Milan's Navigli district in 2022.

=== Rome – John Cabot University ===
POLIMI GSoM has collaborated with John Cabot University in Rome on management-education initiatives.

=== Pieve del Grappa – La Salle Academy ===
POLIMI GSoM and La Salle Academy have collaborated on management-training programmes in the Veneto region.

== Alumni ==
POLIMI Graduate School of Management reports an alumni community of more than 20,000 graduates and approximately 3,000 students each year.
