= Master of European Design =

European design school degree

Master of European Design (MEDes) is a unique degree programme within a network of seven leading design schools in Europe.

== The structure of the programme ==
During the five-year programme, students experience three design education systems and join a strong international community. The location diversity provides insight into design approaches, multi-national perspectives and creates sensitivity towards cultural differences.

- In the first and second year, the students study at their home universities
- The third year is spent at one of the international partner universities
- At the end of third year, the students submit their BA theses to their home university.
- The fourth year is spent at a second partner university
- For the fifth - final year - the students return to their home universities to complete their Master theses.

During the two years abroad the students follow the curricular content offered by the programme of the respective partner university. This results in each student acquiring a unique skill set and combination of projects. The studies abroad take place in English or in the respective national language.

== The seven European Design partner institutions ==
- Glasgow School of Art, Glasgow, United Kingdom
- Aalto School of Art and Design, Helsinki, Finland
- Politecnico di Milano, Milan, Italy
- ENSCI-Les Ateliers, Paris, France
- Konstfack, Stockholm, Sweden
- Köln International School of Design, Cologne, Germany
- University of Aveiro, Aveiro, Portugal

== Previous partners ==
- Staatliche Akademie der Bildenden Künste Stuttgart

== Sources ==
- Official Homepage
- Description of MEDes on Köln International School of Design Homepage
- Description of MEDes on the ENSCI Homepage
- Description of MEDes on the Politecnico di Milano Homepage
- An Article about MEDes on core77 Design blog
- MEDes on cumulusassociation.org
