= Nicola Pezzetta =

Italian artist from Udine (born 1963)

Nicola Pezzetta (born 1963) is an Italian artist from Udine.

== Career ==
While completing architectural studies at the Politecnico in Milan, Pezzetta started participating in international exhibitions in the early 1990s, showing artworks pertaining to the ambit of abstract painting. The former non-representational experiences based on geometric patterns turned, in short time, into a fictional image inventory influenced by organic processes.

The core point of his artistic work is the analysis of human space conceived as a psychological issue. According to systems theory, developed since the beginning of the 1980s, each individual interacts with perceived artworks within a systemic psychological and cultural environment. In the ambit of the systemic paradigm, space and individuals are no more referred to positivism and its intrinsic belief that the observer does not interfere with his own observed environment. On the contrary, Systems theory has clearly demonstrated that space and individuals follow an evolutionary process in which they are organically interconnected as parts of a cultural environment that includes also entropy and noise disturbing information signal, communications and cognitive operations.

Pezzetta has utilized various mediums and techniques ranging from oil and acrylic on canvas, photographs, tri-dimensional installations and, in recent years, computer-generated images, namely digital art tools, including also lettering or text elements deriving form visual poetry.

== Gallery ==
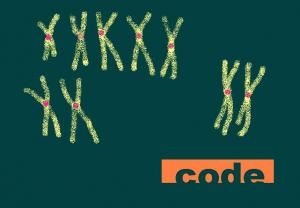
Code, computer-generated image, 2006

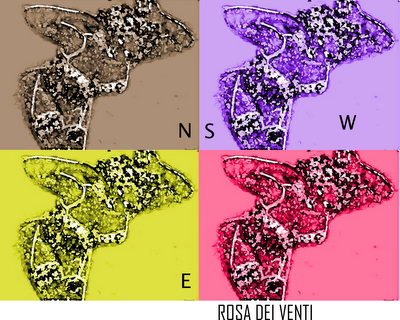
Compass, computer-generated image, 2006
