= Donatella Sciuto =

Italian electronic engineer and academic administrator

Donatella Sciuto (born 1962) is an Italian electronic engineer and academic administrator, the rector of the Polytechnic University of Milan. Her research involves embedded systems, low-power electronics, and multicore Very Large Scale Integration, with applications including smart buildings.

== Education and career ==
Sciuto was born in 1962 in Varese. After earning a laurea in electronic engineering from the Polytechnic University of Milan, Sciuto went to the University of Colorado Boulder for doctoral study in electrical and computer engineering. She also has a Master of Business Administration from Bocconi University.

She became an assistant professor at the University of Brescia in 1986, returned to the Polytechnic University of Milan as an associate professor in 1992, and was promoted to full professor in 2000. She became vice rector of the university in 2010, and executive vice rector in 2015. She was elected as rector for the 2023–2028 term, becoming the first woman to lead the university.

== Recognition ==
Sciuto was elected as an IEEE Fellow in 2011 "for contributions to embedded system design". She was elected to the Academia Europaea in 2022.
