= Adele Racheli =

Italian engineer and patent office owner (1897–1992)

- Born: 14 July 1897; Piacenza, Italy
- Died: 3 January 1992 (aged 94)
- Education: Polytechnic University of Milan
- Occupations: Industrial engineer, business owner
- Known for: Co-creator, Racheli & Bossi Patent Office, Milan, Italy
- Spouse: Costante Domenighetti

Adele Racheli (14 July 1897 – 3 January 1992) was an Italian engineer and co-founder of a successful patent protection office in Milan in 1925 to protect the intellectual property of Italian professionals. The firm still thrives.

== Early life and education ==
Born on 14 July 1897 in Piacenza, Italy, to Maria Carolina (née Pavesi) and Vitorio Racheli, Adelina Racheli had seven younger siblings. As a way to improve her understanding of the lessons she learned in school, she copied her class notes by hand at night and then sold them to her classmates. In Piacenza, she attended high school and two years of university, but after her family moved to Milan, she was one of the first women to enrol at the Polytechnic University of Milan, graduating in industrial mechanical engineering in 1920, the first woman to graduate from the course.

When she was interviewed in 1985, she admitted that her early fascination with mechanics came from a passion to fix bicycles, which in those days, always broke down. Even so, she commented on her life's achievements saying it mattered little if her family "thought she was crazy."

== Career ==
One of Racheli's first jobs was working in a Milan patent office, which became a transformative experience, teaching her the importance of protecting intellectual property. In 1925, she opened her own patent protection office in Milan called the Racheli & Bossi Patent Office, in partnership with a colleague Rosita Bossi. The name of the company has since been shortened to Racheli and now operates two other offices in Italy in addition to the main location in Milan. As of 2020, the company describes itself as a "consultancy firm in industrial and intellectual property, which operates in Italy and abroad also through a selected network of consultants and correspondents."

On 26 January 1957, Racheli was a founder of a new organization to support female professionals. To do so, she worked with engineers Emma Strada, Anna E. Armour, Ines Del Tetto Noto, Laura Lange, Alessandra Bonfanti Vietti and the architect Vittoria Ilardi, to establish the Associazione Italiana Donne Ingegnere e Architetto 'Italian Association of Women Engineers and Architects' (AIDIA). The association was first proposed in 1948 by electrical engineer Maria Artini to help other women who worked in technical fields, but Artini died before AIDIA could be officially started.

The 1985 interview was conducted in the elderly Racheli's office where a plaque, hung ten years before, attested to her 50 years of membership in the Order of Engineers. The interviewer described Racheli's career path and daily work schedule this way:

Entered as a simple clerk in a patent office, Adele Racheli has become the owner of one of the most successful in Milan. Today at the age of 91 she still holds the reins of her office, working there for eight hours a day; she doesn't even come home to have lunch. The only problem, at her age, is no longer having a driver's license and no longer being able to visit customers as she once did. But to interrupt her business; it is a hypothesis that she does not even take into consideration: 'Should I stop prematurely?'

== Personal life ==
On 22 February 1923, Racheli married an engineer named Costante Domenighetti who had attended the same university and set up the company Società Italiana Macchine Edili Stradali e Agricole (SIMESA). This led her to change her name to Adele Racheli Domenighetti. In a 1985 interview, she boasted "of having always managed to earn more than him, who was also a mechanical engineer and had his own company to run." The couple had five children, Domenico, twins Dafne and Diana (b. 1929), Daria, and Delfina.

During World War Two the family moved to Switzerland to avoid the war after their home and offices were destroyed by bombs in 1943.

Adele Racheli Domenighetti died on 3 January 1992.
