= Polytechnic University of Milan =

Technical university in Milan, Italy

- Politecnico di Milano
- Other name: Polimi
- Former names: Istituto Tecnico Superiore (1867–1927); Regio Politecnico di Milano (1927–1945)
- Motto: Scambia la tua mente (Italian)
- Motto in English: "Exchange your mind"
- Type: Public technical university
- Established: 29 November 1863
- Founder: Francesco Brioschi
- Affiliations: Asea Uninet; ATHENS; Cumulus; European Association for Architectural Education; Global E3; Group for International Design Education; Heritage Network; IDEA League; Informatics Europe; International Association of Universities; Magalhães; MEDes; PEGASUS; RMEI; TIME; UASR; UNITECH
- Rector: Donatella Sciuto
- Total staff: 3,345 (2025-26)
- Students: 49,395 (2025-26)
- Doctoral students: 1,853 (2025-26)
- Location: Milan, Lombardy, Italy; 45°28′41″N 9°13′42″E
- Campus: Urban university
- Language: English, Italian
- Colors: White; Livid
- Sporting affiliations: CUS Milano
- Website: www.polimi.it/en

The Polytechnic University of Milan (Italian: Politecnico di Milano, abbreviated as Polimi) is the largest public technical university in Italy, with about 40,000 enrolled students. The university offers undergraduate, graduate, and higher education courses in engineering, architecture and design.

Established in 1863 by Francesco Brioschi, the Politecnico di Milano is the oldest university in Milan; inspired by German and Swiss polytechnics, Brioschi founded the school in the hope of bettering Italy's scientific and technological progress. By the 20th century, the school had gained international recognition thanks to its influential faculty and a strong emphasis on largely modernist principles.

The university is made up of two central campuses in Milan, the Bovisa and Leonardo, where the majority of the research and teaching activities are located, as well as other satellite campuses in five other cities across Lombardy and Emilia-Romagna. The university’s central offices and headquarters are located in Città Studi’s Leonardo Campus, active since 1927.

Since its foundation, the Politecnico di Milano provides a diverse selection of graduate programs. Of its 40,000 students, about 8,000 are international from more than 100 countries. The university also has established partnerships with several other institutions around the world, including ETH Zurich, TU Delft, and the Massachusetts Institute of Technology. As of 2024, the Politecnico di Milano had an acceptance rate of 28%.

The Politecnico di Milano is considered one of the leading technical universities in Italy and in Europe, and is consistently ranked as one of the best schools for architecture, design and engineering in the world. According to the QS World University Rankings for the subject area 'Engineering & Technology', it ranked in 2026 as the 20th best in the world; It also ranked 6th for architecture, 7th worldwide for design, 14th for civil and structural engineering and 14th for mechanical and aerospace engineering. In 2024, SCImago Institutions Rankings listed the school 6th for architecture and amongst the top fifty schools for engineering in the world.

Some of the most notable alumni and professors from the school include Nobel laureate Giulio Natta, engineer, inventor, and aeronautical pioneer Enrico Forlanini, astrophysicist Amalia Ercoli Finzi, novelist Carlo Emilio Gadda, musician Demetrio Stratos, and architects Renzo Piano and Aldo Rossi.

== History ==
List of rectors of the Politecnico di Milano
Rector	Tenure
Francesco Brioschi (1824—1897)	1863—1897
Giuseppe Colombo (1836—1921)	1897—1921
Cesare Saldini (1848—1922)	1921—1922
Luigi Zunini (1856—1938)	1922—1926
Gaudenzio Fantoli (1867—1940)	1926—1940
Carlo Isnardo Azimonti (1876—1943)	1940—1943
Gino Cassinis (1885—1964)	1944—1960
Gino Bozza (1899—1967)	1960—1967
Bruno Finzi (1899—1974)	1967—1969
Francesco Carassa (1922—2006)	1969—1972
Luigi Dadda (1923—2012)	1972—1984
Arrigo Vallatta (1930—2001)	1984—1987
Emilio Massa (1926—1998)	1987—1994
Adriano De Maio (b. 1941)	1994—2002
Giulio Ballio (b. 1940)	2002—2010
Giovanni Azzone (b. 1962)	2010—2016
Ferruccio Resta (b. 1968)	2017—2022
Donatella Sciuto (b. 1962)	2022—current

The Politecnico di Milano was founded on 29 November 1863 by Francesco Brioschi, secretary of the Ministry of Education and rector of the University of Pavia. Its establishment was part of a broader movement in Italy to advance technical and scientific education, which in result would support industrial and technological development during the country's early years of unification.

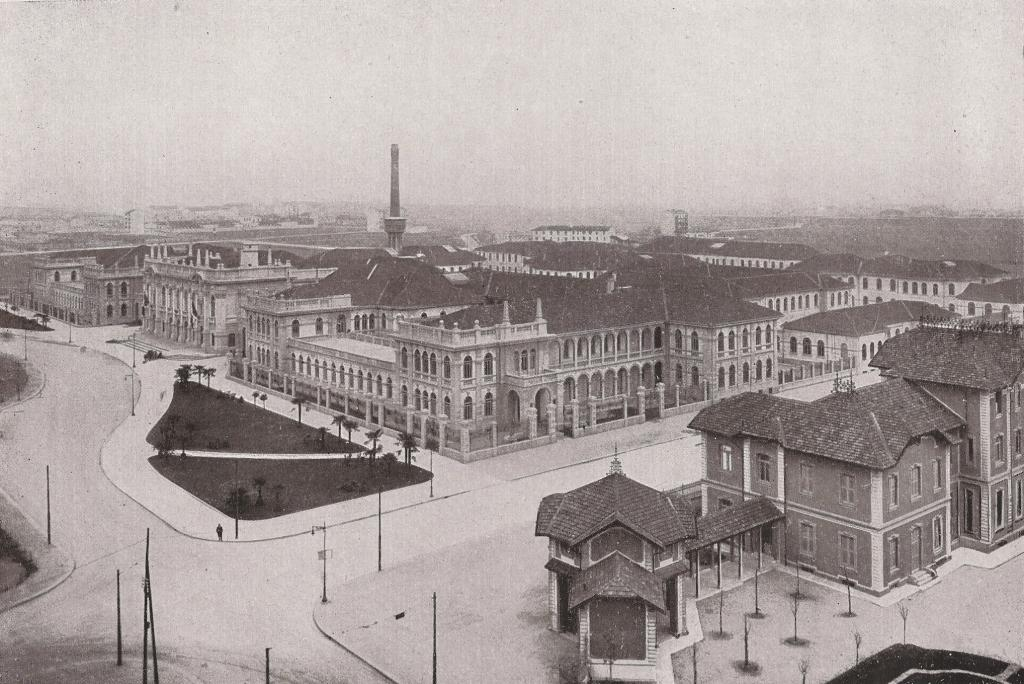
Città Studi buildings in 1930

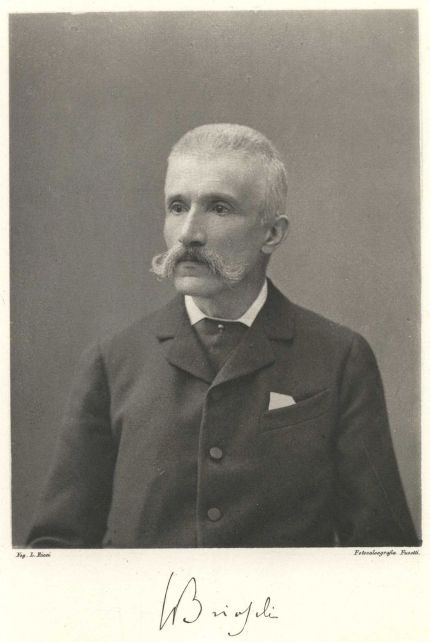
Francesco Brioschi (1824–1897), founder and first rector of the Politecnico di Milano.

Its original name was Istituto Tecnico Superiore (which translates to "Higher Technical Institute") and only Civil and Industrial Engineering were taught. Architecture, the second main line of study at the university, was introduced in 1865 in cooperation with the Brera Academy. There were only 30 students admitted in the first year. Over the decades, most of the students were men: the first female graduate from the university was in 1913.

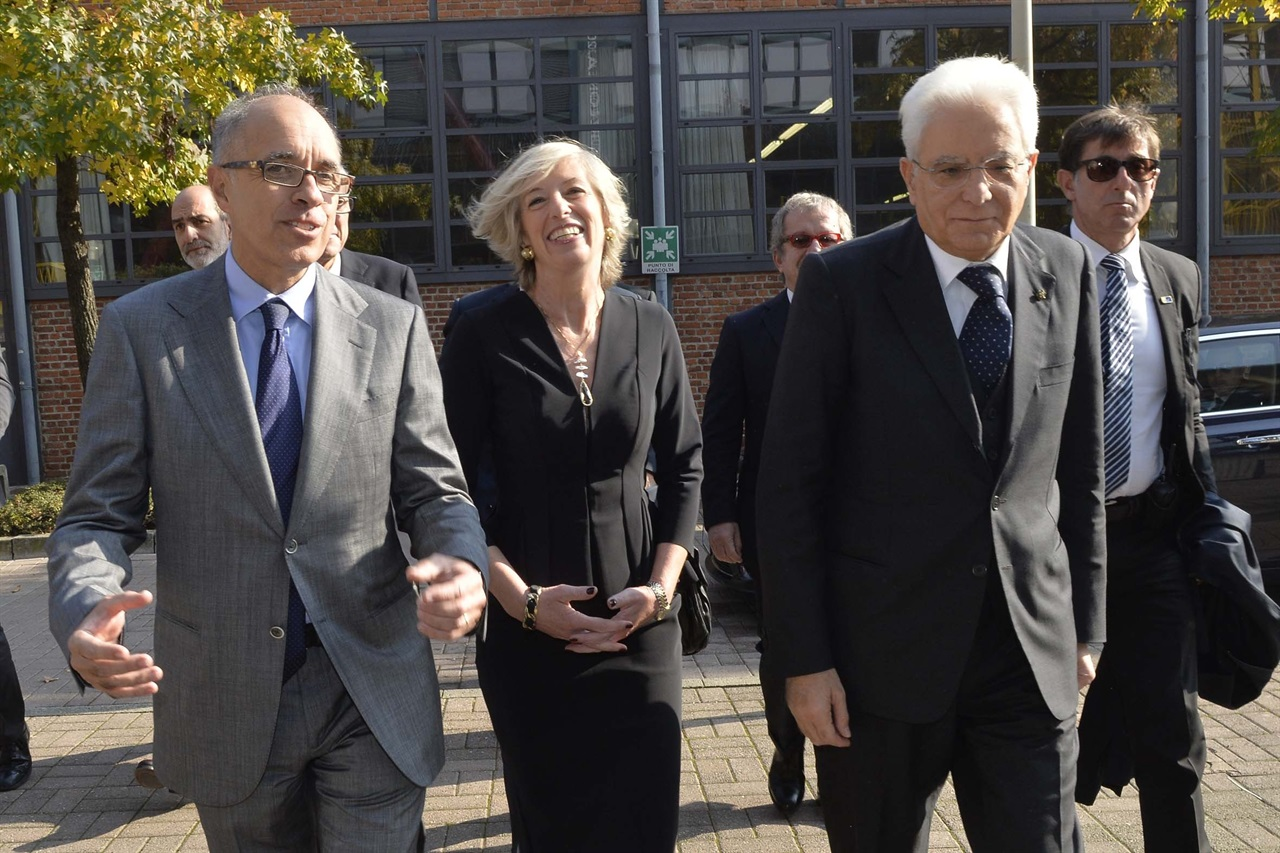
Former rector Giovanni Azzone with the Education Minister Stefania Giannini and Italian President Sergio Mattarella at the Bovisa campus in 2015

In 1927 the university moved to piazza Leonardo da Vinci, in the district now known as Città studi (City of Studies), where the university's main facilities are still today. At the time, it was named Regio Politecnico ("Royal Polytechnic"). The word Regio was removed as Italy was proclaimed a republic at the end of World War II. The historical building still in use today was designed and built by engineers and architects all graduated from the university itself.

The present logo, based on a detail of the preparatory sketch of Raphael's School of Athens, was adopted in 1942. Until then, there was no official logo for the institution.

In 1954, the first European centre of electronic computation was opened at the university by Gino Cassinis and Ercole Bottani. In 1963 Giulio Natta received the Nobel Prize in Chemistry for his research on crystalline polymers, polypropylene in particular. In 1977, the satellite Sirio, jointly developed by the university and other companies, was launched. In 1979, POLIMI Graduate School of Management, the Polytechnic's business school has been created.

Since the end of the 1980s, the university has begun a process of territorial expansion that would have resulted in the opening of its satellite campuses in Lombardy and Emilia-Romagna. A university program in industrial design was started in 1993. In 2000, the university's faculty of design was created with new courses in undergraduate and postgraduate programs of graphic & visual, fashion and interior design along with the already existent industrial design.

In April 2012, the university announced that, beginning in 2014, all graduate courses would be taught only in English. This decision was then partially revised, after the decision of the Italian Supreme Court, that stated the Italian language could not be totally abolished nor downgraded to a marginal role. On the 7th of September 2019, XJTU-POLIMI Joint School has been opened in Xi'an, China, which is a joint school of Polytechnic University of Milan and Xi'an Jiaotong University.

== Campuses ==
Leonardo Campus

Student Hill at the Milan La Masa campus

EN:lab, a laboratory building of the Department of Energy at the Milan Bovisa campus

Ebony, Department of Chemistry, Materials and Chemical Engineering "Giulio Natta", at the Milan Bassini campus

B1 building at the Milan Bovisa campus

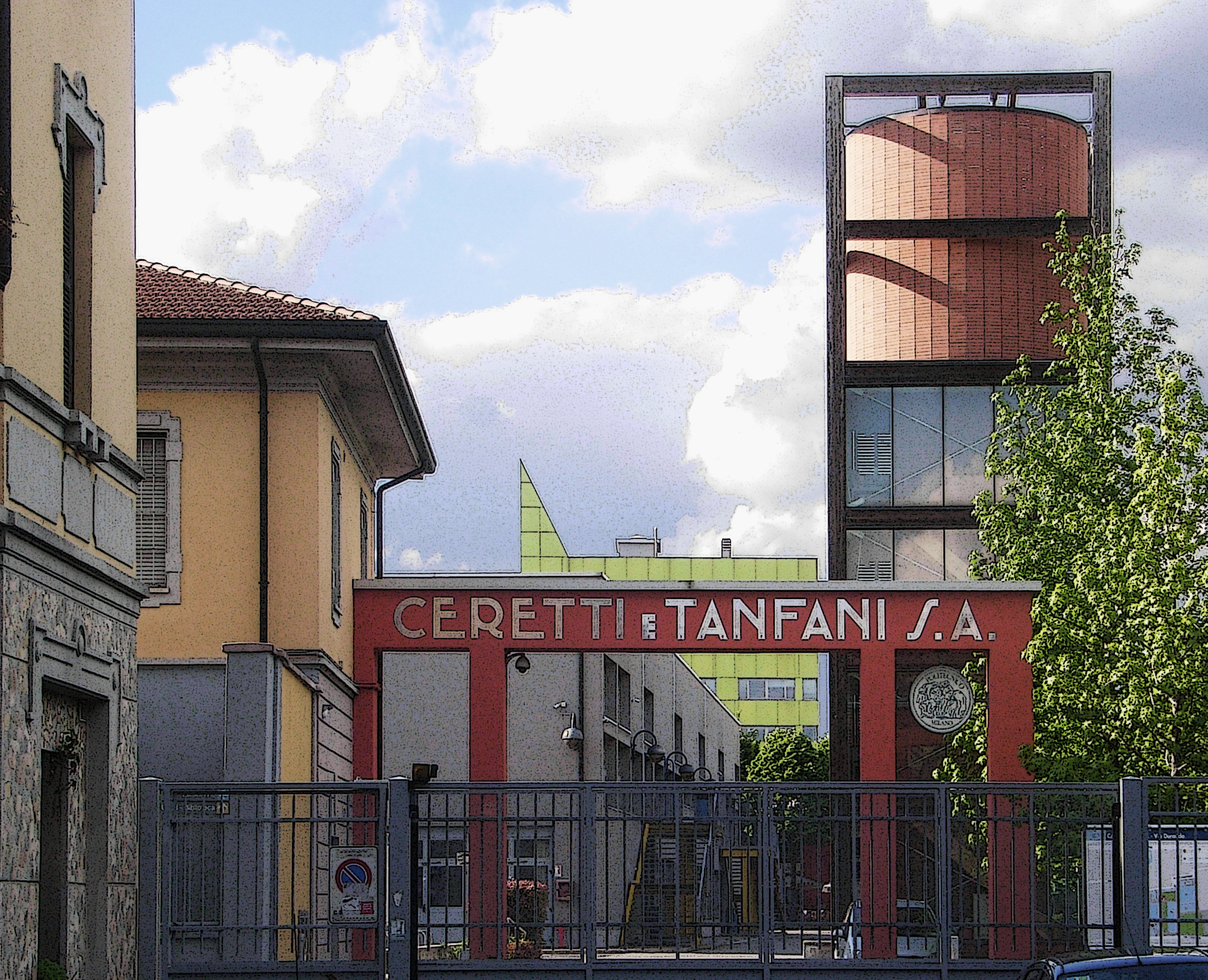
Entrance to the Design area of the Bovisa campus (Durando)

Gardens of the Rectorate at the Milan Leonardo campus

The Renzo Piano Archive at the Milan Leonardo campus

The University is spread over seven campuses: two main campuses in Milan and another three satellite campuses across Lombardy (Lecco, Cremona, Mantua) and one Emilia-Romagna (Piacenza).

=== Milan Leonardo ===
Milan Leonardo is the oldest of the university's campuses still in use. The first buildings on Piazza Leonardo da Vinci were inaugurated in 1927. Over the years, the complex has been expanded and is now generally referred to as "Città Studi", City of Studies, which also refers to some faculties of the University of Milan in the same area. The campus extends over several streets: Leonardo, Bonardi, Clericetti, Mancinelli, Gran Sasso and Colombo. The Leonardo Campus is the main campus of the university and comprises the central administration offices, the rectorate, and most of the research departments.

=== Milan Bovisa ===
The Milan Bovisa campus is located in the Bovisa district of Milan and became active in 1989; campus Bovisa is today composed of campus Durando, opened in 1994, and campus La Masa, inaugurated in 1997. The first is the seat of the School of Design, while the second is dedicated to Industrial, Mechanical, Aerospace, and Energy Engineering faculties. Bovisa also houses the related research facilities, including the wind tunnel.

=== Other campuses ===
The first satellite campuses opened in 1987 in Como and in 1989 in Lecco. During the 1990s, three other branches opened in Cremona (1991), Mantua (1994), and Piacenza (1997). These last three branches are currently open. On the 7th of September 2019, XJTU-POLIMI Joint School has been opened in Xi'an, China, which is a joint school of Polytechnic University of Milan and Xi'an Jiaotong University.

== Academics ==
The Politecnico di Milano offers several three-year undergraduate courses, two-year graduate courses, one-year master courses and PhD programs in the fields of engineering, architecture and design. The university offers 32 first level (Bachelor) degree programs.

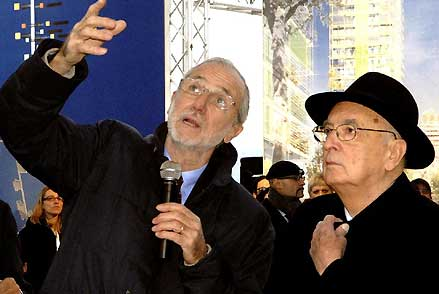
Renzo Piano with the President of Italy Giorgio Napolitano in 2007

The academic year is divided into two terms, or semesters, the first from mid-September to late January and the second from March to late June. There are 3 exam sessions: those at the end of each semester (in February and July) and one more in September. Students need to achieve 60 "university credits" (CFU or Crediti Formativi Universitari) per year during their Bachelor's and master's degrees. Therefore, the 3-years Bachelor requires 180 credits while the 2-years Master 120. The university, like most universities in Italy, is organized to comply with the framework of the Bologna Process.

The university maintains several relations with foreign universities and offers a wide range of international projects for student exchange, The university encourages the enrollment of foreign students by providing several courses in English, German and Spanish. It participates in the ENTREE network for student exchange among Electrical Engineering colleges in Europe and it is a member of Top Industrial Managers for Europe (TIME) network.

The Alta Scuola Politecnica is a joint institution of the Politecnico di Milano and Polytechnic University of Turin addressed to young talents who want to develop their interdisciplinary capabilities for leading and promoting innovation, and runs in parallel to the two-year programs of laurea magistrale (graduate courses).

=== International opportunities ===
The university offers several opportunities for students that want to integrate their studies with an experience outside Italy. Some of them are:

- ATHENS Programme
- ERASMUS Programme
- Erasmus Mundus Programme
- Master of European Design
- Partnership of a European Group of Aeronautics and Space Universities
- UNITECH International
- Global Engineering Education Exchange

PhD students may also take advantage of "Progetto Rocca MIT-PoliMi Program", an international program that allows them to spend a visit period working at Massachusetts Institute of Technology.

=== Rankings ===
University rankings

Global – Overall
- ARWU World: 301-400 (2025)
- QS World: 87 (2026)
- THE World: 201–250 (2026)

Global – Science and engineering
- ARWU Electrical & Electronic Engineering: 151-200 (2025)
- QS Engineering & Tech.: 20 (2026)
- THE Engineering: 63 (2026)

National – Overall
- ARWU National: 8-12 (2025)
- QS National: 1 (2026)

According to the QS World University Rankings, the university is ranked as 87th overall in the world, the first Italian university in this ranking. By field of study, it is ranked 7th for Design, 6th for Architecture, and 20th for Engineering and Technology. More specifically, it was also ranked as the 14th best university in the world regarding civil and structural engineering topics. The SCImago Institutions Rankings listed the school 5th for Architecture and amongst the top 50 in Engineering in 2026. As for Italian national rankings, the university was ranked the best university for Engineering and among the top big universities in Italy in the CENSIS-Repubblica Italian University rankings for the academic year 2011–2012. In 2009, an Italian research ranked it as the best in Italy over indicators such as scientific production, the attraction of foreign students, and others.

=== Admission ===
==== Engineering ====
The admission in the undergraduate program in engineering at the university is bound to an admission test, aimed to verify the starting preparation of every student. The main goal of this test is to point out the lacks of aspiring students and, in case, to assign them an extra course. Only some programs have a strictly limited number of places, even if the Academic Senate fixes an approximate maximum number of students for every program. The admission test for any Engineering school, except Construction Engineering, is divided in four parts, each about one of the following general subject: English Language; Logic, Mathematics and Statistics; Verbal Comprehension; Physics.

==== Architecture, Design and Construction Engineering ====
Architecture, Design and Construction Engineering schools have a limited number of students admitted every year and the selection is based on a national test administered by the Ministry of Education. The test is divided into five parts, each about one of the following general subject: Logic and General Knowledge; History; Drawing and Representation; Mathematics and Physics.

==== Graduate programs ====
Admission to the graduate programs in the university requires an undergraduate degree and a set of requirements specific for each school, such as the time spent in obtaining the undergraduate degree or the grade point average scored during the undergraduate program. The university also offers courses of study for the title of Dottore di Ricerca (PhD), MBA courses, and other postgraduate courses. The university's POLIMI Graduate School of Management is one of the most prominent management schools in Italy and was ranked as the 96th best business school in the world by Financial Times in 2011.

=== Departments ===
The Politecnico di Milano is organized in 12 departments:

- Architecture and Urban Studies (DASTU)
- Architecture and Civil Engineering of the Built Environment (DABC)
- Chemistry, Chemical, and Material Engineering "Giulio Natta" (DCMC)
- Design (DESIGN)
- Electronics, Information Technology, and Bioengineering (DEIB)
- Energy (DENG)
- Physics (DFIS)
- Civil and Environmental Engineering (DICA)
- Management, Economics, and Industrial Engineering (DIG)
- Mathematics (DMAT)
- Mechanical Engineering (DMEC)
- Aerospace Engineering and Technology (DAER)

=== Library System and publishing ===
The library system of the university counts more than 470,000 records distributed over the libraries in the campuses. The system comprises four central libraries along with teaching libraries (department libraries). The titles registered in the library system can be searched through an online public access catalogue (OPAC). Since autumn 2004, the Politecnico di Milano has owned a publishing trademark, Polipress, created mainly to publish researches by the university community. The trademark publishes also the free Politecnico periodical.

== Scientific research ==
The Politecnico di Milano participates in European and international networks of scientific research. In the year 2004 alone, about 60 large scale, multi-year international research projects have been initiated or participated by the university, just in the context of the European Research framework. As of 2026, the university took part in over 281 FP7 research projects. The Politecnico di Milano was the first university in Italy for total number of European research funding awarded under the Horizon 2020 program, with 296 projects and a total of €125.7 million. Under Horizon Europe (2021–2027), it had obtained 420 funded projects, for a total of over €194 million, including 44 ERC grants and 66 MSCA Postdoctoral Fellowships, as of March 2026. €218 million were raised from self-financing in 2024.

The university has a long history of research. Many scientists working in the university have received awards and recognition by the scientific community: among them, the most famous is Giulio Natta, the only Italian Nobel laureate for Chemistry, in 1963, who was the head of the Department of Industrial Chemistry. The University also operated the first research nuclear reactor in Italy, the 50kW LM54, from 1959 to 1979 in the "Enrico Fermi Nuclear Research Institute" and now operates several important laboratories such as one of the biggest wind tunnels in Europe. The Politecnico has more than 250 research laboratories, 35 interdepartmental laboratories and 20 PhD programmes.

The university participates in associations and consortia for applied research, including Joint Research Programmes (JRP) with companies. As of 2026, it reported 39 JRPs, involving more than 600 researchers and producing over 1,000 publications and 229 patents in the 2017–2026 period. The university has offices to assist technological transfers and continuing education for professionals. As of 30 November 2024, its technology transfer figures included 3,408 patents, corresponding to 1,123 inventions. It also supports the establishment of research spin-offs (119 spin-offs from 2000 to 2024), and also of high-tech companies during their start-up phase, with a structure named PoliHub.

According to the 2025 CWTS Leiden Ranking, in the 2020–2023 period the university had a mean normalized citation score (MNCS) of 1.07, while 10.7% of its publications were among the top 10% most cited publications in their field and publication year.

== Governance ==
The Rector, the Academic Senate and the Board of Directors (Consiglio di Amministrazione) are the governing bodies of the university. Internal Financial Auditors (Collegio dei revisori dei conti) controls the management and finance of the University. There are several other consulting bodies, among them the Students' Council, which is directly elected by students and serves in an advisory role. The Rector represents the University and coordinates the Academic and Research activity. The tenure of the Rector is six years and can serve only one term.

== Student life ==
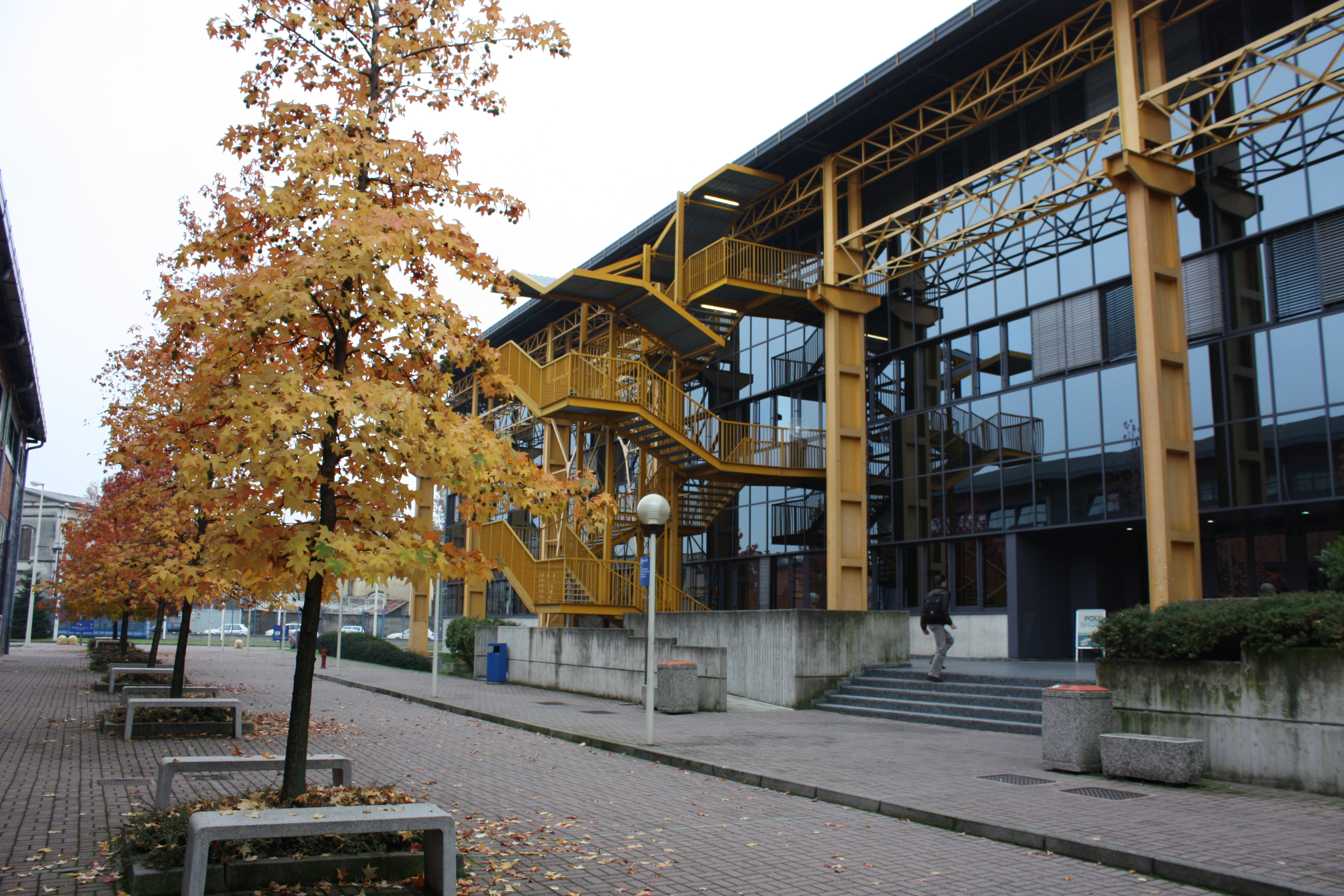
Exterior of the main engineering building, Bovisa campus

Tuition fees at the Politecnico di Milano depend on each student's family income. They range between about 150 €/year and 3726 €/year. Students with an outstanding GPA (usually ≥ 27/30 or 29/30) are granted partial or full rebates, in addition to various kinds of scholarships. There are many scholarships for international students as part of the recent university internationalization strategy.

Most Italian universities do not offer accommodation for their students on campus. The university manages a limited number of approximately 2000 beds available for students. Most students from outside the city are either commuters or renters. It is common for both Italian and international students to share flats due to the expensive real-estate market of the city.

All the university campuses are covered by a Wi-Fi network, connected and interoperable with the Eduroam service.

=== Organizations ===
The Istituto per il Diritto allo Studio Universitario (ISU) manages additional student facilities such as scholarships, student housing, open libraries, lending of computers, cafeterias and study spaces.

Educafe is a cultural center in the Leonardo campus, where students can meet and events are held regularly.

Among the student organizations:

- BEST Milano (Board of European Students of Technology) a European non-profit and politically neutral organization, focus on Empowered diversity, done by students for the students and present in more than 30 countries.
- ESN (Erasmus Student Network) a non-profit organization, gathering exchange students and encouraging exchange projects.
- Euroavia, an organization founded to gather aerospace students of the Politecnico di Milano and make easy to contact other aerospace students in Europe.
- Associazione Ingegneri Ambiente e Territorio (Environment and Territory Engineers Association), a student association composed by students in Environmental Engineering.
- Teatro delle Biglie (Theatre of the Marbles), an independent non-profit organization, born as a theatre association.
- POuL (Politecnico Open unix Labs), a student association for students interested in promoting open source and free software.
- POLI.RADIO is the student web radio.
- IEEE Student Branch of the Politecnico di Milano.
- BEA – Biomedical Engineering Association, an independent bioengineering students organization to create a network between students and professors, to promote activities and projects
- Skyward Experimental Rocketry, an association with the goal of design and developing small sounding rockets and unmanned aerial vehicles.
- Physis PEB

=== Professional opportunities and statistics ===
The 2025 graduate survey shows that 94% of graduates of the Politecnico di Milano find a job within six months from graduation, and 97% within a year. The figures are similar for the bachelor and the masters level graduates. A specialized "Career Service" facilitates contacts between graduates and the industry, it invites companies for presentations and prepares statistics about graduated students. It posts several stage and job offers every day both for students and graduates.

As of 2024, approximately 61% of students complete their studies on time.

=== Student politics ===
Students at the university elect representatives in the Academic Senate, the Board of Directors and in the Boards of Schools. Currently, there are four main political groups in student elections:

- La Terna Sinistrorsa (The left-hand coordinate system), the left-wing organization. The name is a pun on the Cartesian three-dimensional coordinate system.
- Lista aperta per il diritto allo studio (Open list for the right to study), a movement based on the value of student's quality, generally considered as conservative because of its affinity to the Catholicism and Communion and Liberation, even if it defines itself as not politically oriented.
- Svoltastudenti – La Students' Union del Politecnico di Milano (The Students' Union of the Politecnico di Milano), which takes inspiration from the Anglo-Saxon student-groups, is not politically oriented or religiously sided and its main purpose is to provide services to students.
- Studenti Indipendenti (Independent Students)

There are also other smaller groups. However, participation in student elections is generally low, as a result of low participation in extra academical activities. In the last elections, it figured out a new wave of interest, with 20% of participation (after the 16% of the previous ones).

== Notable alumni ==
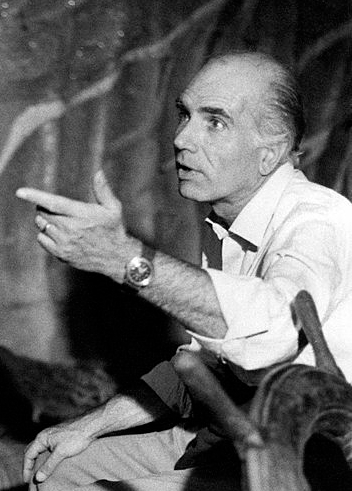
Luigi Comencini

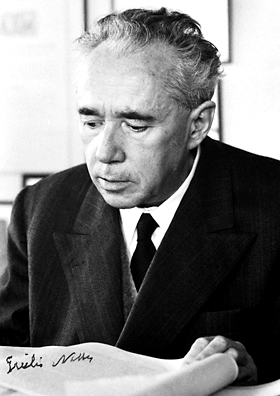
Giulio Natta

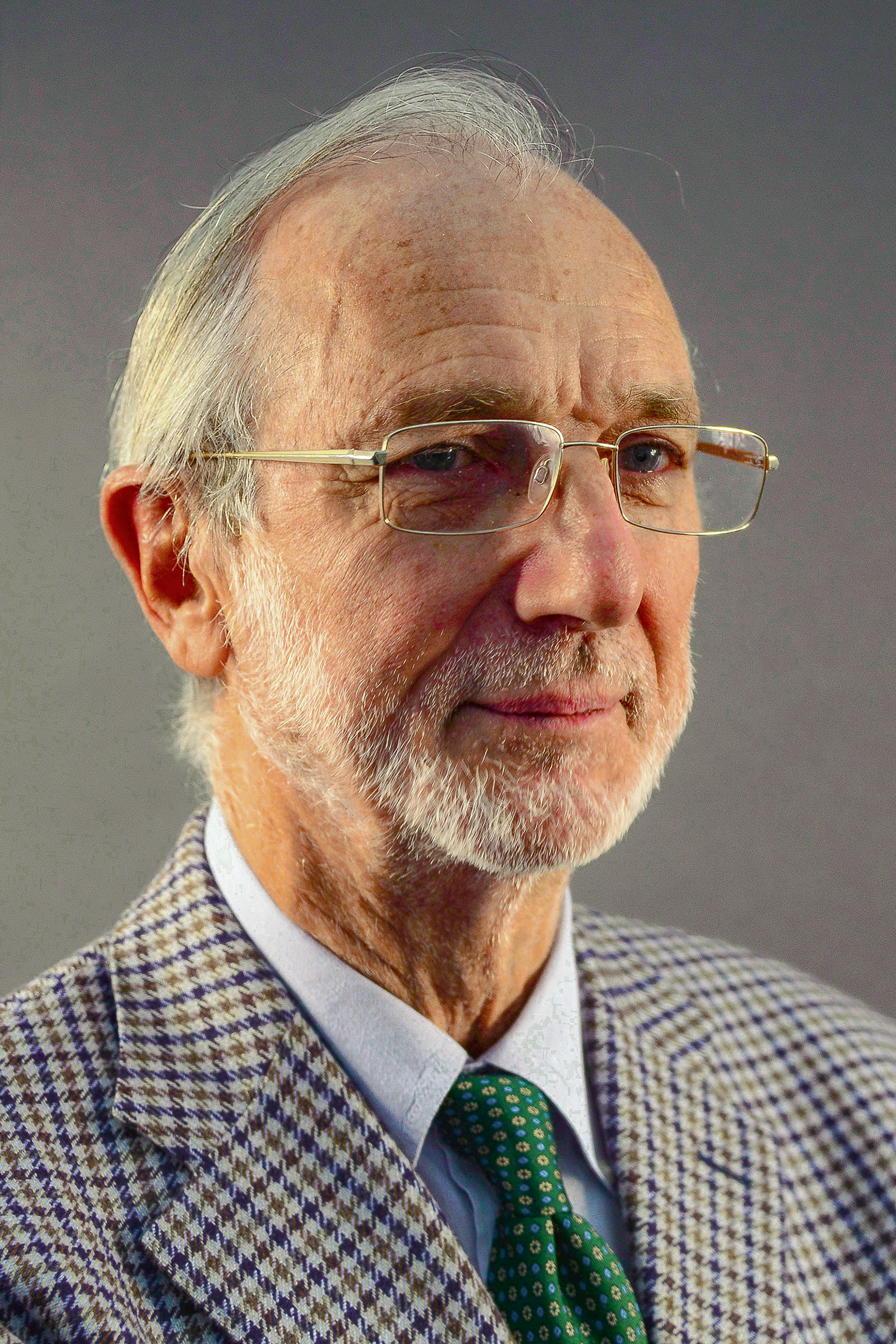
Renzo Piano

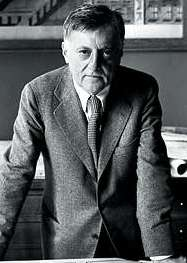
Aldo Rossi
- Franco Albini (architect, designer, and academic, 1905–1977)
- Maria Artini (first female university graduate in electrical engineering in Italy and the second female engineering graduate of the Milan Polytechnic, 1894–1951)
- Sergio Asti (architect and designer, 1926–2021)
- Gae Aulenti (architect and designer 1927–2012)
- Mario Bellini (architect and designer, b. 1935)
- Chiara Bisagni (aerospace engineer)
- Sotiris Bletsas (architect, minority rights activist and politician, b. 1956)
- Andrea Branzi (architect and designer, b. 1938)
- Cini Boeri (architect and designer, 1924–2020)
- Achille Castiglioni (architect and designer, 1918–2002)
- Enrico Castiglioni (engineer and architect, 1914–2000)
- Livio Castiglioni (architect and designer, 1911–1979)
- Pier Giacomo Castiglioni (architect and designer, 1913–1968)
- Claudio Ciborra (organizational theorist, 1951–2005)
- Antonio Citterio (architect and designer, b. 1950)
- Giampaolo Dallara (engineer and entrepreneur, b. 1936)
- Carla De Benedetti (photographer and photojournalist, 1932–2013)
- Elio (musician, b. 1961)
- Amedeo Felisa (businessman, b. 1946)
- Gianfranco Ferré (fashion designer, 1944–2007)
- Enrico Forlanini (engineer and inventor, 1848–1930)
- Stelio Frati (aeronautical engineer, 1919–2010)
- Emanuela Frattini Magnusson (architect and designer, b. 1959)
- Gianfranco Frattini (architect and designer 1926–2004)
- Chiara Fumai (performance artist 1978–2017)
- Carlo Emilio Gadda (engineer and writer, 1893–1973)
- Francesco Giavazzi (economist, b. 1949)
- Vittorio Gregotti (architect, 1927–2020)
- Franca Helg (architect and designer, 1920–1989)
- Piero Lissoni (architect and designer, b. 1956)
- Italo Lupi (graphic designer and writer 1934–2023)
- Vico Magistretti (industrial designer and architect, 1920–2006)
- Angelo Mangiarotti (architect and industrial designer, 1921–2012)
- Alberto Meda (engineer and designer, b. 1935)
- Giulio Natta (chemist and Nobel Laureate, 1903–1979)
- Gilbert Daniel Nessim (chemist, b. 1966)
- Antonio Pedotti (bioengineer)
- Giovanni Pellegrini (architect, 1908–1995)
- Stefano Pessina (billionaire businessman, b. 1941)
- Nicola Pezzetta (architect and artist, b. 1963)
- Renzo Piano (architect, b. 1937)
- Giovanni Battista Pirelli (entrepreneur, 1848–1932)
- Gio Ponti (architect, 1891–1979)
- Adele Racheli (first woman engineering graduate, founder of patent protection office 1897–1992)
- Ernesto Nathan Rogers (architect, 1909–1969)
- Aldo Rossi (architect, 1931–1997)
- Francesco Starace (business executive, b. 1955)
- Saul Steinberg (cartoonist and illustrator, 1914–1999)
- Giuseppe Terragni (architect, 1904–1943)
- Angelo Torricelli (architect, b. 1946)
- Patricia Urquiola (architect and designer, b.1961)
- Massimo Vignelli (designer, 1931–2014)
- Demetrio Stratos (singer, 1945–1979)
- Tatiana Wedenison (first woman in Italy to attempt an engineering degree and the first to enroll at Politecnico in 1888)
- Marco Zanuso (architect and designer, 1916–2001)
- Orazio Svelto (Physicist 1936)

== See also ==
- Category:Academic staff of the Polytechnic University of Milan
- List of universities in Italy
- POLIMI Graduate School of Management
