= Bruno Sacchi =

Italian architect

Bruno Sacchi (1 January 1931, Mantua - 27 January 2011, Florence) was an Italian architect and collaborator of Giovanni Michelucci. He is known for his work on the Museo Marino Marini at the former church of San Pancrazio in Florence, the Museo Marino Marini at the TAU Convent in Pistoia, collaborations with Giovanni Michelucci and designs of private houses.

== Biography ==
Born in Mantua, he moved to Florence in 1950. In 1961 he graduated from the University of Florence with a degree in Architecture, his thesis on the 'New Headquarters of the Kunsthistorishces Institut of Florence', tutored by Prof. A. Libera. He became voluntary assistant at the Istituto die Caratteri Distributivi deli Edifici until 1963 when he launched his architectural career, founding the design and architecture studio 'Forte 63' with three colleagues: Giancarlo Nocentini, Lorenzo Papi and Niccolo' Rucellai. He entered a phase of project development of various architectural complexes including the Augustus Hotel, Forte dei Marmi, Italy, Chiocchio church, Greve in Chianti, Italy and Chioma Beach tourist complex in Castiglioncello, Livorno, Italy.

== Work ==
He competed in national and international projects including the Pompidou Centre, Paris, the State Archive in Florence, Italy and the Bundeshauptstadt in Berlin. At the same time, his numerous interior and furnishing projects were featured in a number of publications. Highlights include his design for the Borgo San Jacopo apartment in Florence were published in Casa Vogue, Issue 5, November 1970 and House and Garden, Issue 9, November 1972. His medieval tower and home, Torre di Sopra in Bagno a Ripoli, featured in 'Casa Vogue, Issue 102, January 1980, Maison Francaise, February 1981, Casamica, April 1984, House and Gardens, December 2015 and others; His apartment in San Remo, Italy, feature in Casa Vogue, October 1983, Styles of Living. The Best of Casa Vogue]' by Isa Vercelloni, 1985 (front cover) and 'Mediterranean Houses in Italy, by Albera and Monti, 1992.

His collaboration with Prof. Giovanni Michelucci, which lasted until the professor's death in 1990, included projects for the Monte dei Paschi bank in Colle Val d'Elsa, the Headquarters of the Valdimontone Contrada in Siena, the Cassa di Risparmio bank in Pistoia, and private houses. His work as exhibition curator includes numerous exhibitor stands for the annual Prato Expo in the 1970s, an exhibition on Magnelli, Palazzo Strozzi, Florence; an exhibition on Giovanni Michelucci at the R.I.B.A, London, 1978, exhibition on Kurosawa, Palazzo Comunale, Pistoia, 'Lo Spazio Sacro di Michelucci', in collaboration, the crypt of San Domenico, Siena; 'Michelucci per la citta', la citta' per Michelucci', Palazzina Reale of Santa Maria Novella Station, Florence, on the occasion of the centenary of Michelucci's birth.

He designed the Centro Giovanni Michelucci in the Palazzo Comunale of Pistoia, edited the publication of Giovanni Michelucci La Pazienza delle stagioni (The patience of seasons), with contributions from Ludovico Quaroni, Salvatore di Pasquale and Giovanni Landucci.

Other projects include the restoration of the former Magazzini Duilio 48 for the COIN store in Florence's historic city centre, the development of the new square in Colle Val d'Elsa; the restoration of the former church of S. Pancrazio in Florence, for the Marino Marini Museum; project for a private club and restaurant in Tokyo, the Musical Conservatory in Pistoia, a residential centre in Scandicci, open air theatre in the Certosa di Calci, near Pisa; plans for the underground carpark at Santa Maria Novella Station in Florence; and the enlargement and refurbishment of the thermal baths at Saturnia.

His 1989 project for the restoration and conversion of the church of San Pancrazio in Florence for the development of the Marino Marini Museum was mentioned in the 'National Award for Restoration and Enhancement of an ancient architectural complex' promoted by Inarch. The project was published in 'L'Arca', Issue 25, March 1989, 'Professione Architetto', Issue 3, June 1989, 'Keramikos', Issue 11, August 1989 and 'Riabita', June 1994. He continued his restoration, refurbishment and interior design on many private houses including: Villa Scarpa, Villa Asso, Casa Sicari, Casa Antognoni, Casa Zuccari, Casa Guidetti, Casa Bufalini, Casa Matteini, Casa Zuffa, Casa Bray, Casa Connory, Casa Guinness, Casa Orlando, Casa Passalacqua and Casa Borgherout in Florence; Casa Righi at Forte dei Marmi and Villa Cambi and Casa Bottari in Prato.
