= Emma Strada =

Italian engineer (1884–1970)

- Emma Strada
- Born: 18 November 1884; Turin, Kingdom of Italy
- Died: 26 September 1970 (aged 85); Turin, Italy
- Occupation: Engineer
- Organization: Italian Association of Women Engineers and Architects (AIDIA)

Emma Strada (Turin, 18 November 1884 – Turin, 26 September 1970) an Italian civil engineer, was the first woman to obtain a civil engineering degree from the Polytechnic of Turin. She later became the first president of the Italian Association of Women Engineers and Architects (AIDIA).

== Early life ==
Emma Strada was born on 18 November 1884 in Turin, Italy. She came from a family of engineers: her father Ernesto Strada and brother Eugenio Strada were also engineers. Her father owned a studio in Turin.

== Engineering ==
=== Education ===
In 1903 Strada finished the Liceo Classico Massimo d’Azeglio high school in Turin. The same year she was enrolled in the preparatory course in Engineering Sciences at the University of Turin, which later allowed her to enroll in the Scuola di Applicazione per Ingegneri (later the Polytechnic University of Turin). This was a rare occurrence because prior to this only men had taken the courses. In 1900 in the whole Italy there were only 250 female university students. She was allowed to take the course after regulators were consulted and found no clauses against a female entrant.

Strada studied for five years and graduated with honours on 5 September 1908, ranking 3rd of her 62 classmates. The commission is said to have taken an hour to decide whether to declare her an "ingegnere" (engineer) or "ingegneressa" (engineeress). She became the first woman ever to obtain a civil engineering degree from the Polytechnic of Turin and in the whole of Italy. Her graduation was a significant sign of ongoing change in the profession. As a graduation gift, and to celebrate her achievement of becoming a civil engineer, Strada had an electric light installed in her home. Electricity was hardly available in Turin during Strada's time and she would often travel around the city in a horse drawn carriage because automobiles were rare and street lamps were lit with gas.

=== Career ===
In her first two years after graduation, Strada worked as an assistant lecturer for Luigi Pagliani, the director of the Cabinet of Industrial Hygiene (Gabinetto di Igiene Industriale) at the University of Turin and a lecturer at the Politecnico in the course of Hygiene, in the Sanitary Engineering Faculty from 1908 to 1914. Due to social constraints of the time it was unlikely for a woman to have an academic career, so she worked alongside her father and younger brother who were both engineers. She worked in her father's technical office of construction and surveying. She helped design and construct industrial plants, surface water tunnels, mines, railway lines and social housing. One of the major projects she worked on was the creation of the surface water tunnel 50 metres (160 ft) below a copper mine in Ollomont, Aosta Valley.

In 1910 Strada’s father closed his studio in Turin and most probably moved his professional activities to Calabria. In Catanzaro, Strada helped her father build a funicular railway between Catanzaro Città and Catanzaro Sala.

Strada had a very successful career working in the railway sector, which was a big achievement as it was predominantly a male sector. Among her designs are railway sections in Liguria and Piedmont. After the Second World War, women gained civil rights and gender equality in terms of the law. Working in factories, offices and other industries meant that different social relationships were formed, however due to misogynistic views of society at the time, many female architects and engineers found it difficult to get work.

It is known from the Almanacco della Donna Italiana that in 1937 Strada had her professional studio in Turin.

=== Italian Association of Women Engineers and Architects (AIDIA) ===
On 26 January 1957 engineers Emma Strada, Anna E. Armour, Ines Del Tetto Noto, Adele Racheli Domenighetti, Laura Lange, Alessandra Bonfanti Vietti and the architect Vittoria Ilardi, who first gathered at the Exhibition of the Mechanics in Turin in 1955, founded the Associazione Italiana Donne Ingegnere e Architetto 'Italian Association of Women Engineers and Architects' (AIDIA). The "brilliant idea" for the association is credited to Italy's first female graduate in electrical engineering, Maria Artini, who died before AIDIA could be realized. Strada was appointed the first president by members. The aims of the association were to promote and create a network for visibility, and to promote the work of women engineers and architects on national and international levels. AIDIA tries to improve working conditions for women in the technology sector, promoting reciprocal help among professionals without the competition or rivalry so frequently found in this area of work.

In 1957 Strada supported the first National Convention of AIDIA with the title "Affirmations and Possibilities of Women in Technological Areas". Strada took part in the second national conference of AIDIA where she started the debate about opportunities for women professionals in technology fields. In 1964 on her 80th birthday, she was given a gold medal by the National Italian Association of Engineers for her work and in 1968 she was invited to attend the Third International Conference of Women Engineers and Scientists, but she died a few months before the event. In 1971 the third International Conference of AIDIA was organised in Turin and was attended by 240 women graduates from some 35 different countries. The participants discussed such current issues in professional work as Planning for Progress and The Professional and Family Obligations of Women.

AIDIA not only organised the congresses that became meeting points for professional concerns about certain issues, but also encouraged international participation in developing an inter-professional and cultural network. AIDIA has a web page from which they keep promoting the visibility of women engineers’ and architects’ work and share first hand information about their events and projects.

== See also ==
- Ada Bursi – Italian architect and designer (1906–1996)
