= Musica Jazz =

Italian jazz magazine

- Director: Luca Conti
- Categories: Music magazine, jazz, music journalism
- Frequency: Monthly
- Founder: Gian Carlo Testoni
- Founded: 1945
- First issue: August 1945
- Company: 22Publishing
- Country: Italy
- Based in: Milan
- Language: Italian
- Website: musicajazz.it

Musica Jazz is an Italian monthly magazine specializing in jazz. Founded in 1945 by journalist Gian Carlo Testoni, it is one of the world's longest-running jazz magazines, publishing reviews and news articles covering the jazz genre; it once published Italy's jazz record charts. The magazine is currently edited by Luca Conti.

== History ==
Italian journalist Gian Carlo Testoni founded Musica Jazz in 1945. It was published for its first 36 years by Messaggerie Musicali, beginning with its first issue in August of that year. Testoni edited the magazine through 1965, when Arrigo Polillo became its editor-in-chief. Based in Milan, the magazine was Italy's only monthly magazine specialized in jazz, publishing news articles, music reviews, and at one point the country's jazz record charts.

In November 1981, Rusconi Editore — one of Italy's biggest publishing companies — purchased Musica Jazz. Rusconi's involvement guaranteed a wider distribution of the magazine as well as significant improvements to the quality of its content. Each issue was subsequently packaged with an LP record by the musician who was profiled in the main feature story; in later years, these were substituted by CDs.

Pino Candini, the head executive of Rusconi's television and entertainment division, became the deputy editor under Polillo, before assuming the role of editor-in-chief a few years later. A long-time jazz enthusiast, Candini edited the magazine until November 1997, when he died after a five-year battle with cancer. Jazz Journal International wrote a piece on Musica Jazz and Candini after his passing, crediting the magazine's success to his vision, adding that Musica Jazz was "one of the better jazz magazines on the world market", featuring "first class photography" and a quality informed by Candini's "good taste and sound judgement".

Subsequent editors included Claudio Sessa, Filippo Bianchi, and Luca Conti, who has edited the magazine since January 2012. One of the longest-running jazz journals worldwide, Musica Jazz published its 750th issue in May 2013. It is currently published by 22Publishing.

== See also ==
- Federazione Industria Musicale Italiana
- Italian jazz

== Bibliography ==
- Anon. (1997). Jazz Journal International (December).
- Anon.[a] (n.d.). "Musica Jazz Store". Musica Jazz (in Italian).
- Anon.[b] (n.d.). "Festival della saggistica – Luca Conti". Passaggi (in Italian).
- Caroli, Daniele (1976). "From the Music Capitals of the World". Billboard. No. 6 November.
- Jones, Peter, ed. (1981). "New Publisher for 'Musica Jazz'". Billboard. No. 7 November.
- Stearns, Marshall W. (1970) [1956]. The Story of Jazz. Oxford University Press. ISBN 0195012690.
