= Rodolfo Bonetto =

Italian designer and jazz drummer (1929–1991)

- Born: 18 September 1929; Milan, Lombardy, Italy
- Died: 28 March 1991 (aged 61); Milan, Lombardy, Italy
- Occupations: Designer, Percussionist
- Known for: Industrial design

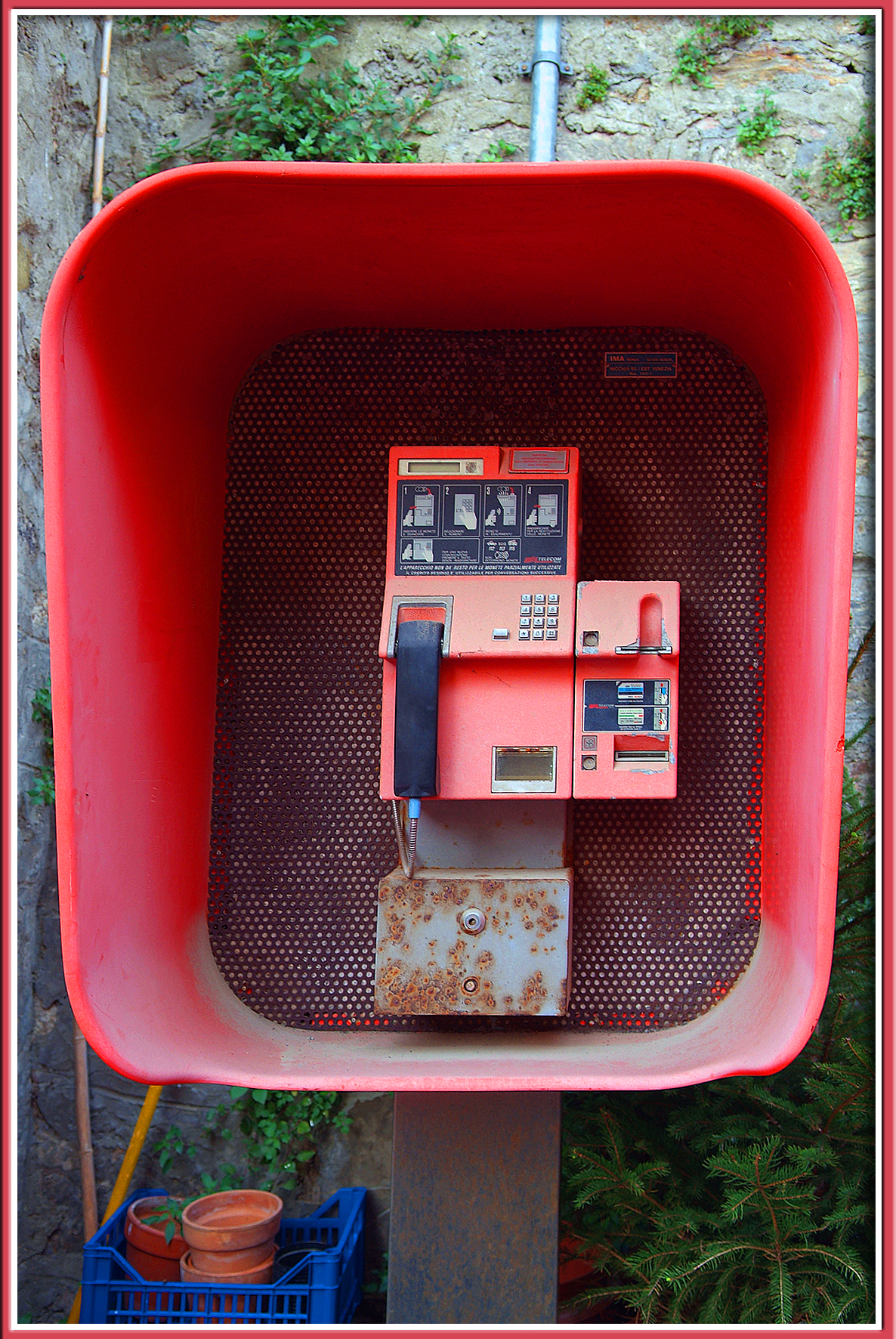
Public telephone Rotor for SIP, 1987

Rodolfo Bonetto (Milan, 18 September 1929 – Milan, 28 March 1991) was an Italian musician and designer. He was one of the leading proponents of Italian industrial design in the post war period. His designs won eight Compasso d'Oro Awards and made an important contribution to the international recognition of "Made in Italy" products.

Before becoming such a prominent designer, Bonetto was also a Jazz drummer who was considered by the music critic Arrigo Polillo to be one of the best Italian drummers, along with Leonello Bionda and Gil Cuppini.

== Biography ==
After his high school education, Bonetto took some drumming lessons and began playing, later joining the band Hot Dandies. In 1955 he joined an Italian sextet, which made several recordings, and with which he participated in the Sanremo International Jazz Festival in 1956. For ten years, from 1949 to 1959, he also worked as a session musician, playing on numerous pop music records in various orchestras, and accompanying the Quartetto Cetra on many recordings.

He then abandoned his career as a jazz drummer to devote himself to drawing. His passion for design was manifested thanks to his paternal uncle Felice Bonetto, a famous racing driver of the early 1950s, who introduced him to motor sports, and the young Bonetto, passionate about this field, began drawing cars.

Self-taught, he began as a design consultant at Pininfarina, where he worked from 1951 to 1957 and further developed his talents. His career as a designer went a level up in 1958, when he founded his own design studio in Milan.

During his long career as a designer he created projects in the most diverse fields of serial industrial production: household appliances, car bodies, sanitary ware, machine tools, consumer electronics, musical instruments, television sets, suitcases, hi-fi systems, furniture, light fixtures, and aircraft instrumentation. Vittorio Gregotti called him an "educated worker" because he understood how to combine his knowledge of production technologies and materials with aspects of ergonomics and a sound study of form.

=== Teaching and governance positions ===
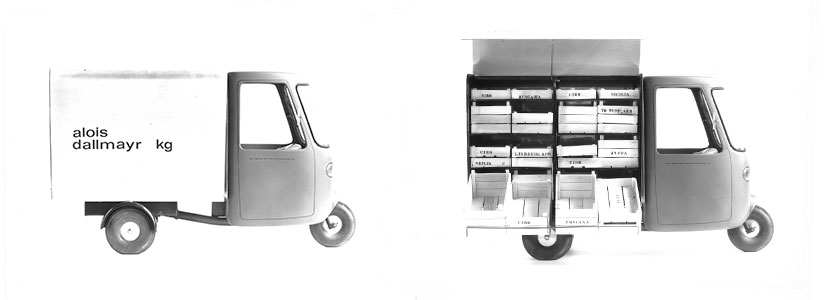
Bartlmae-Transporter designed by HfG Ulm students Kerstin Bartlmae, Peter Kövari, Michael Penck under Bonetto's tutelage (1963-1964)

From 1961 to 1965, Bonetto taught industrial design at the Ulm School of Design; he was the only Italian with an explicit invitation to teach at this institution. Nevertheless, his methods were not totally undisputed, because he favoured a more practical and emotional approach, contrary to the academic and scientific one that the institution was known for. There was even a stand-off between an anti- and a pro-Bonetto group. The latter one, with Pio Manzù in the lead, eventually won and Bonetto could stay on.

From 1974 to 1979 he taught at the ISIA in Rome. He served from 1971 to 1973 as president of the ADI, and from 1981 to 1983 of the International Council of Societies of Industrial Design (ICSID), since 2017 known as WDO, associations of which he was a member. Also, he was a member of Italian and international juries.

=== Furniture, lighting and domestic objects ===
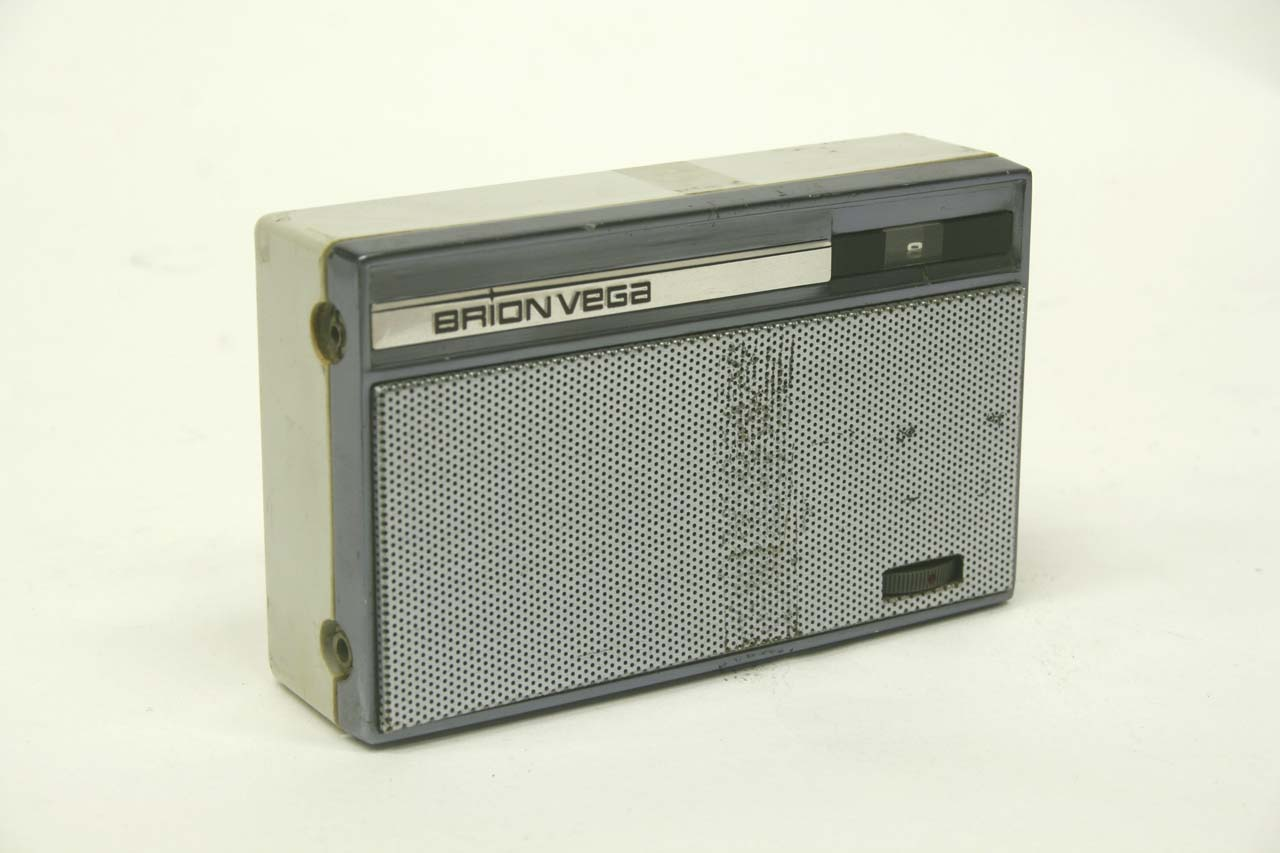
Brion Vega TS 207, 1961

During his career, Bonetto worked for companies like Brionvega, Artemide and Siemens. Some of his works are in the MoMA collection, like a kitchen timer (Veglia-Borletti model 152, 1960), alarm clock (Fratelli Borletti Sfericlock, 1963) and lounge chair (Flexform Boomerang, 1968). In 1970 he was commissioned by manufacturer Bellato to design hotel cabinets. He came up with the Linearsystem, with various furniture pieces in walnut wood. But those turned out too expensive for hotels, after which they were offered to households, where they found all kinds of applications. In the 1970s and 1980s he designed various lamps for iGuzzini. And he worked on projects for the Italian home accessory manufacturer Castelli.

=== Automotive ===
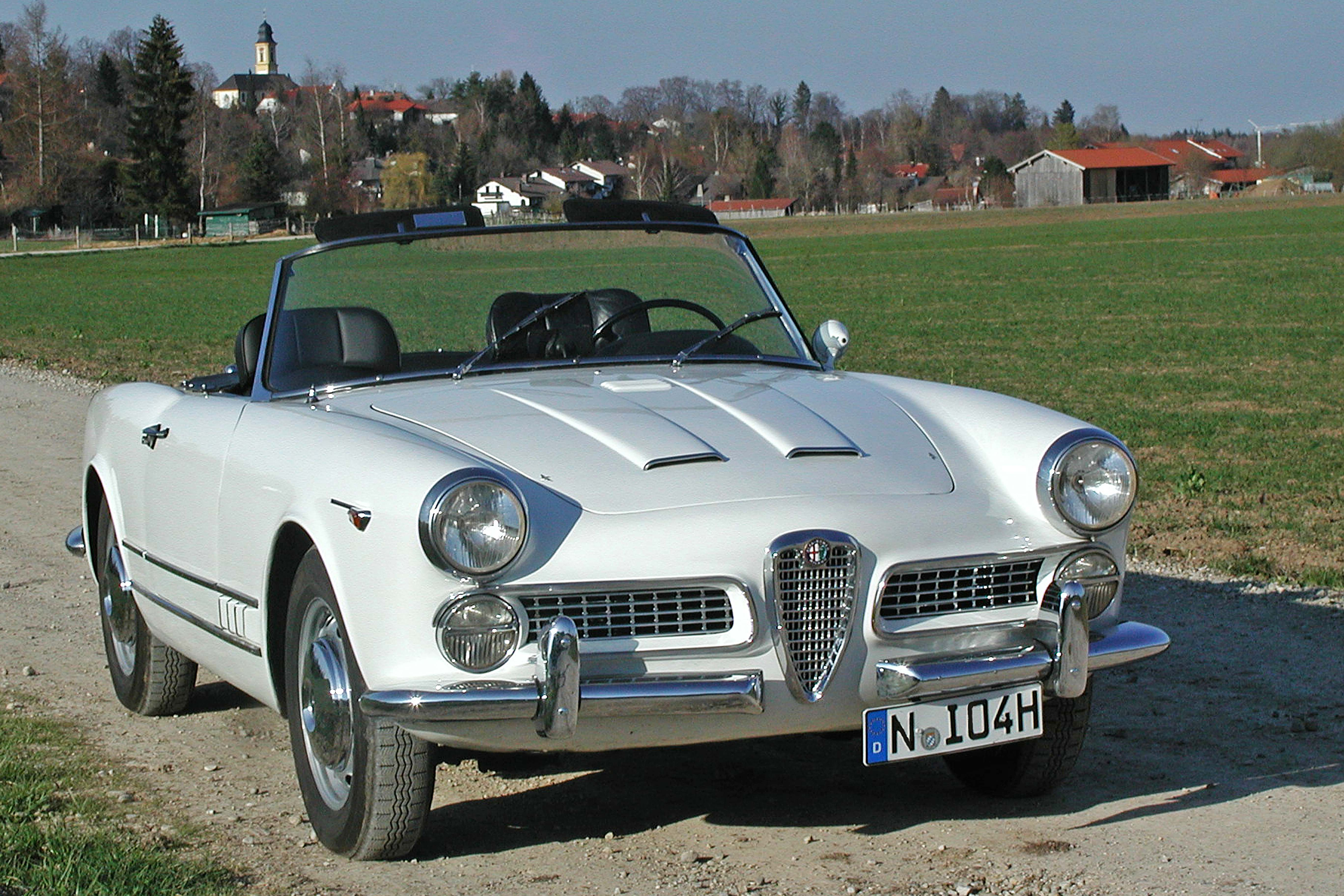
Alfa Romeo 2000 Spider for Touring, 1957

While still playing music, in 1953 Bonetto already designs a Lancia Aurelia for Vignale. After his years at Pininfarina and after opening up his own studio in 1958, Bonetto started working on various automotive assignments. For Touring, Bonetto designed the Alfa Romeo 2000 Spider of 1957. In the early 1960s, he produced a number of designs for Carrozzeria Boneschi in Milan, where he specialised in the design trend Linea Tesa (literally taut line). Examples are the Lancia Flaminia Amalfi and two versions of the OSCA 1600 GT Swift. Another coachbuilder that he did freelance assignments for was Viotti. The concepts that came out of that, were based on Fiats 500, 600 and 1500, and were considered quite ahead of their time.

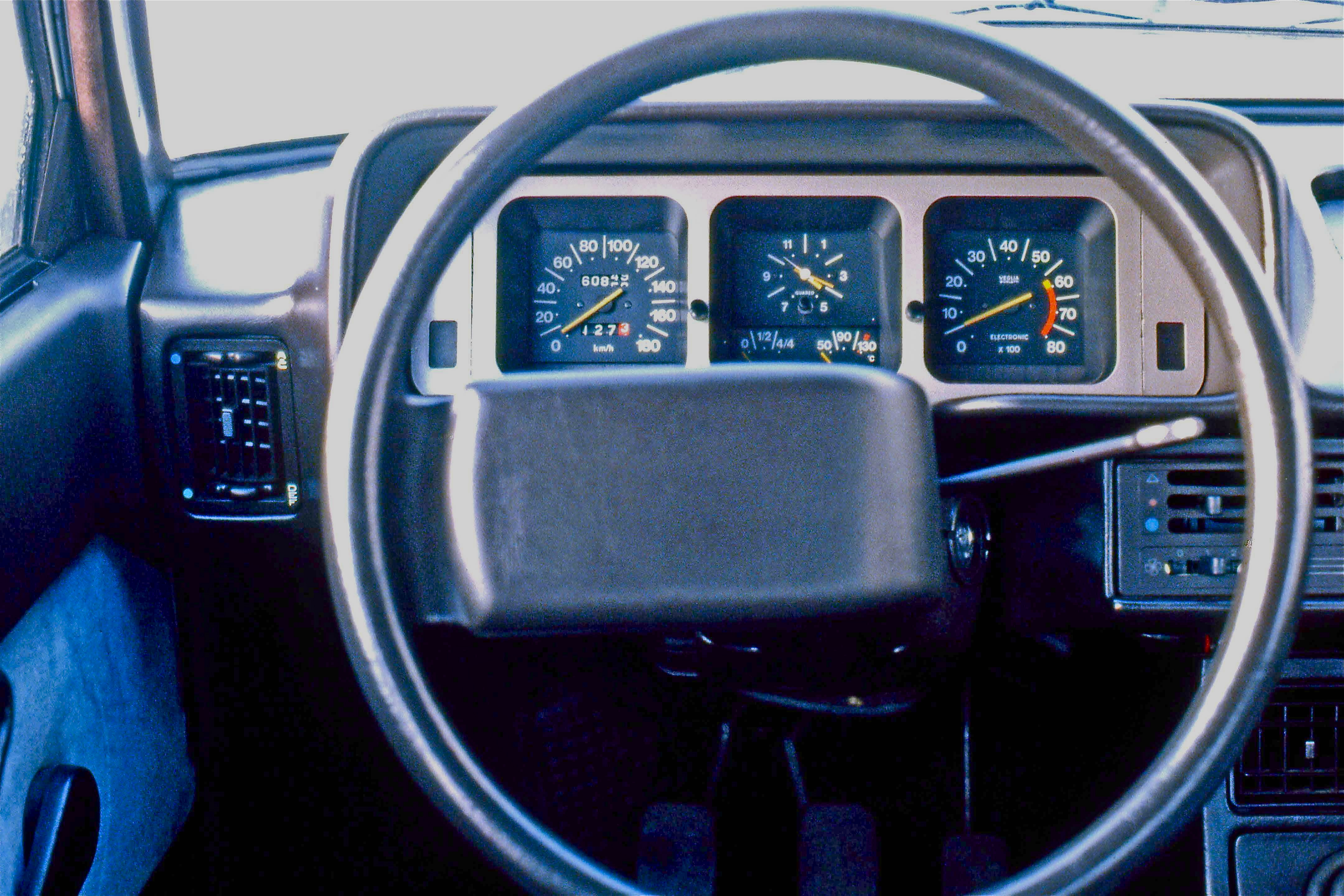
Interior Fiat 131 CL/Supermirafiori, 1978

Eventually, among all the automotive designs that Bonetto made, there were also many car interiors like that of the Fiat Ritmo Super, Fiat Tipo, Croma first generation, and Lancia Y10. Plus the award-winning interior of the Fiat 131 second series CL/Supermirafiori.

=== Recognition ===
Bonetto was one of the few Italian designers who neither studied architecture nor realized any architectural projects. He was awarded eight Compasso d'Oro awards, the last of which came shortly after his death in 1991, as a tribute to his thirty-year career. In 2023, Walter de Silva curated an exhibition called The Rhythm of Design. Rodolfo Bonetto at the ADI Design Museum in Milan, in which were on display thirty objects designed by Bonetto, plus a number of the instruments from his earlier, music career.

His work is continued today by Studio Bonetto Design, headed by his son, Marco Bonetto. In 1994, Marco founded the Bonetto Design Center in Monte Carlo in memory of his father, and further expanded his design practice into the automotive sector. In 1991, the Targa Rodolfo Bonetto award was initiated by his son, aimed at motivating design students. The jury consists of architects, teachers and entrepreneurs.

== Selected works ==
- 1962 Sfericlock alarm clock for Veglia-Borletti (awarded the 1964 Compasso d'Oro)
- 1967 Auctor Multiplex tool machine for Olivetti, (awarded the 1967 Compasso d'Oro)
- 1968 Boomerang lounge chair for Flexform
- 1969 Linea 1 television set for Autovox
- 1970 Automatic microfilm machine for BCM, (awarded the 1970 Compasso d'Oro)
- 1970 Melaina armchair for Driade
- 1972 TV 1202 television set for Voxson
- 1972–1975 Horizon 2 machining center for Olivetti (with Naoki Matsunaga)
- 1979 Interior of the Fiat 131 Mirafiori 2nd series for Fiat Auto (awarded the 1978 Compasso d'Oro)
- 1979 Tanga car radio for Voxson
- 1979 Inspector Midi 130 W for Olivetti (awarded the 1979 Compasso d'Oro)
- 1981 Wiz multipurpose power plant for Wizco (awarded the 1981 Compasso d'Oro)
- 1984 FIRE 1000 engine styling for Fiat Auto
- 1984 Auctor 400 machine tool model for Olivetti (awarded the 1984 Compasso d'Oro)
- 1987 Rotor public telephone SIP
