= Joe Colombo (designer) =

Italian industrial designer (1930–1971)

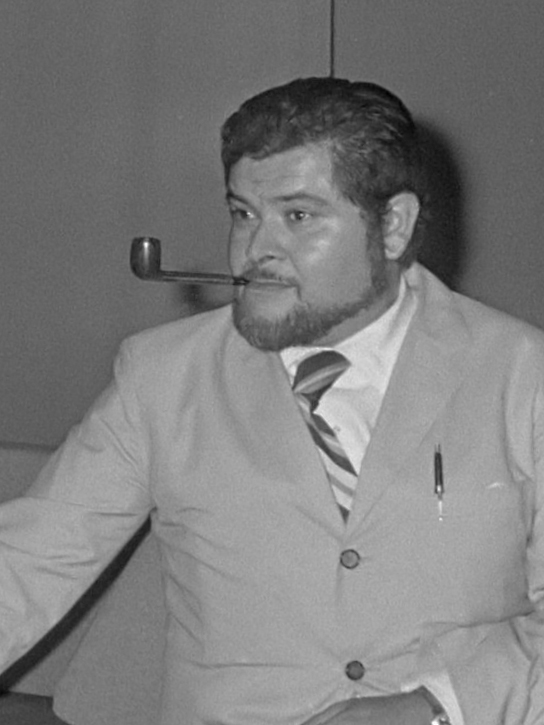
- Colombo in 1969
- Born: Cesare Colombo; 30 July 1930; Kingdom of Italy
- Died: 30 July 1971 (aged 41)
- Education: Accademia di Belle Arti di Brera; Politecnico di Milano
- Known for: Architecture, design
- Movement: Italian Pop design

Cesare "Joe" Colombo (30 July 1930 – 30 July 1971) was an Italian mid-century modernist industrial designer.

== Life and career ==
Cesare "Joe" Colombo was until 1949 educated at the Accademia di Belle Arti di Brera, the academy of fine arts, in Milan as a painter and studied afterwards until 1954 Architecture at Politecnico di Milano University.

In 1951, he joined the Movimento Nucleare, founded by Sergio Dangelo and Enrico Baj. The following four years, Colombo was active as a painter and sculptor of the abstract Expressionism and exhibited his works with other members in Milano, Turin, Verviers, Venice and Brussels.

In 1955, Colombo joined the Art Concret group, but gave up his painting to promote his Design Career. Before he cooperated at an exhibition for the tenth Triennale of 1954 and documented the Ceramic Designs of an international meeting in Albisola. For his presentation, Colombo created, for example, three exterior seatings which were combined with a "shrinelike" presentation of TVs.

In 1959, Colombo had to take over the family company, which produced electric appliances, and started to experiment with new construction and production technologies. In 1962, Colombo opened his own interior design and architecture projects, mostly for lodges and skiing.

Colombo designed products for Oluce, Kartell, Bieffe, Alessi, Flexform, Stilnovo, and Boffi.

Colombo died in 1971 on his 41st birthday of a heart attack.

== Main works ==
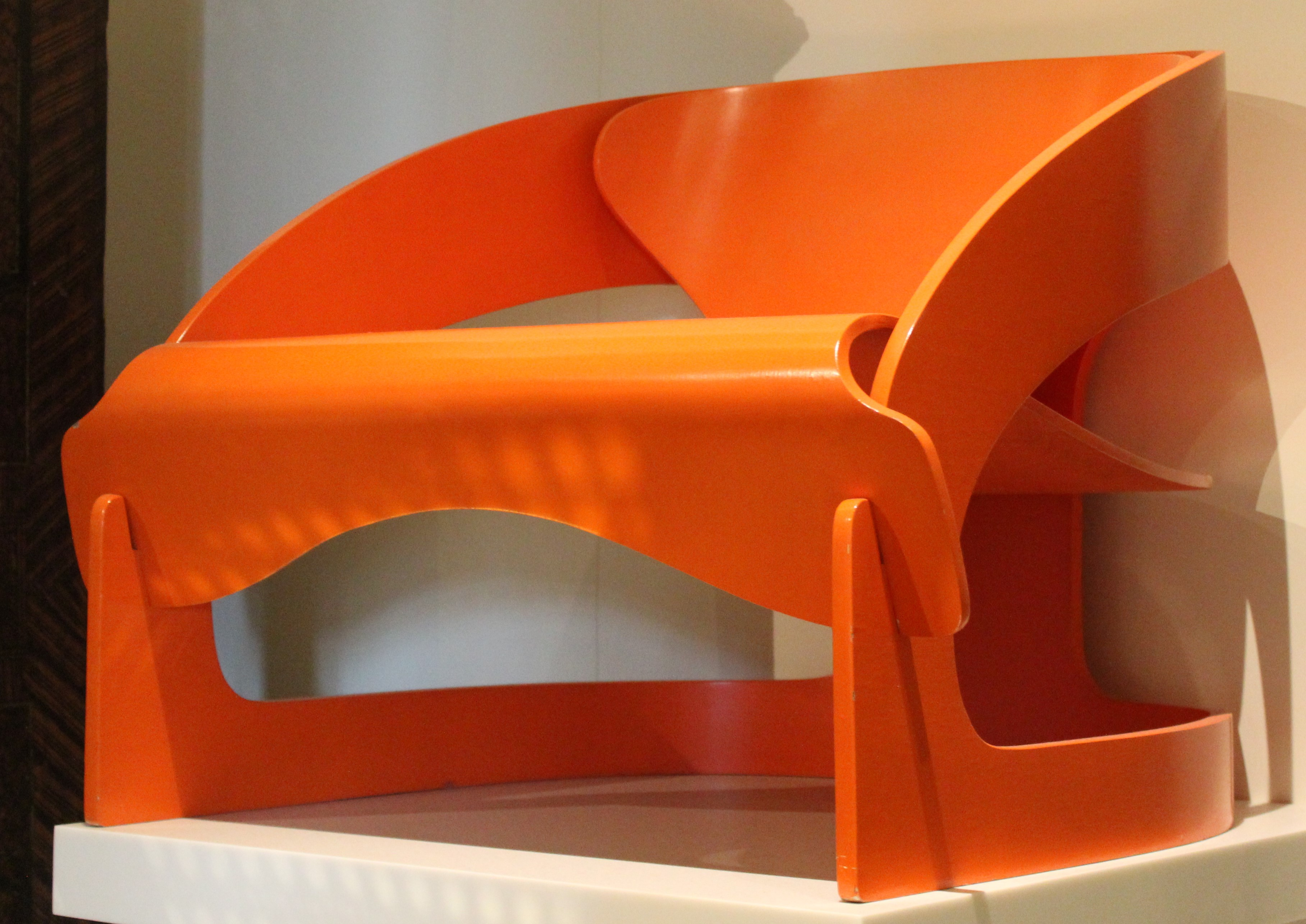
Model 4801 armchair, Kartell (1963)

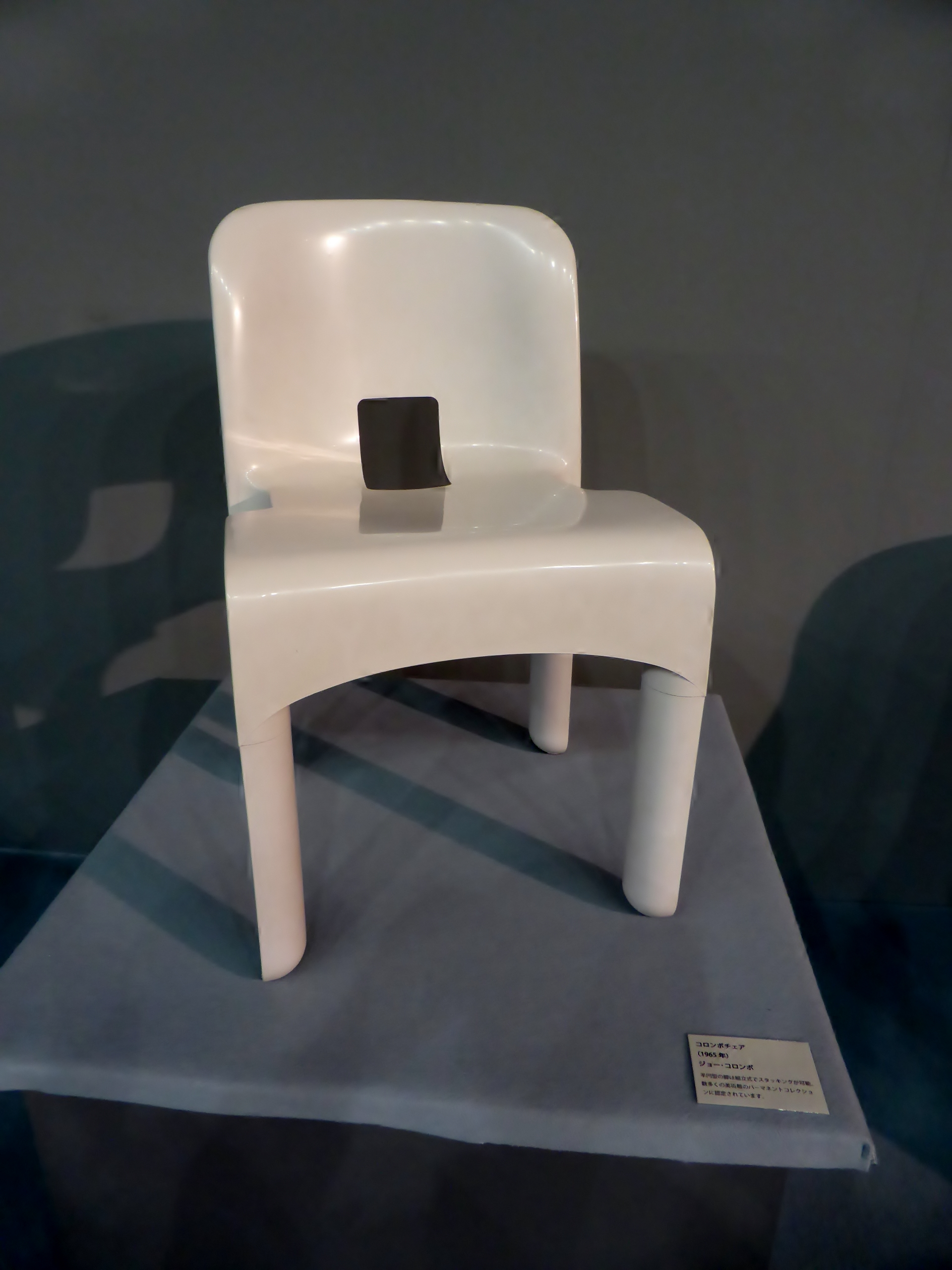
Universale stacking side chairs, Kartell (1965)

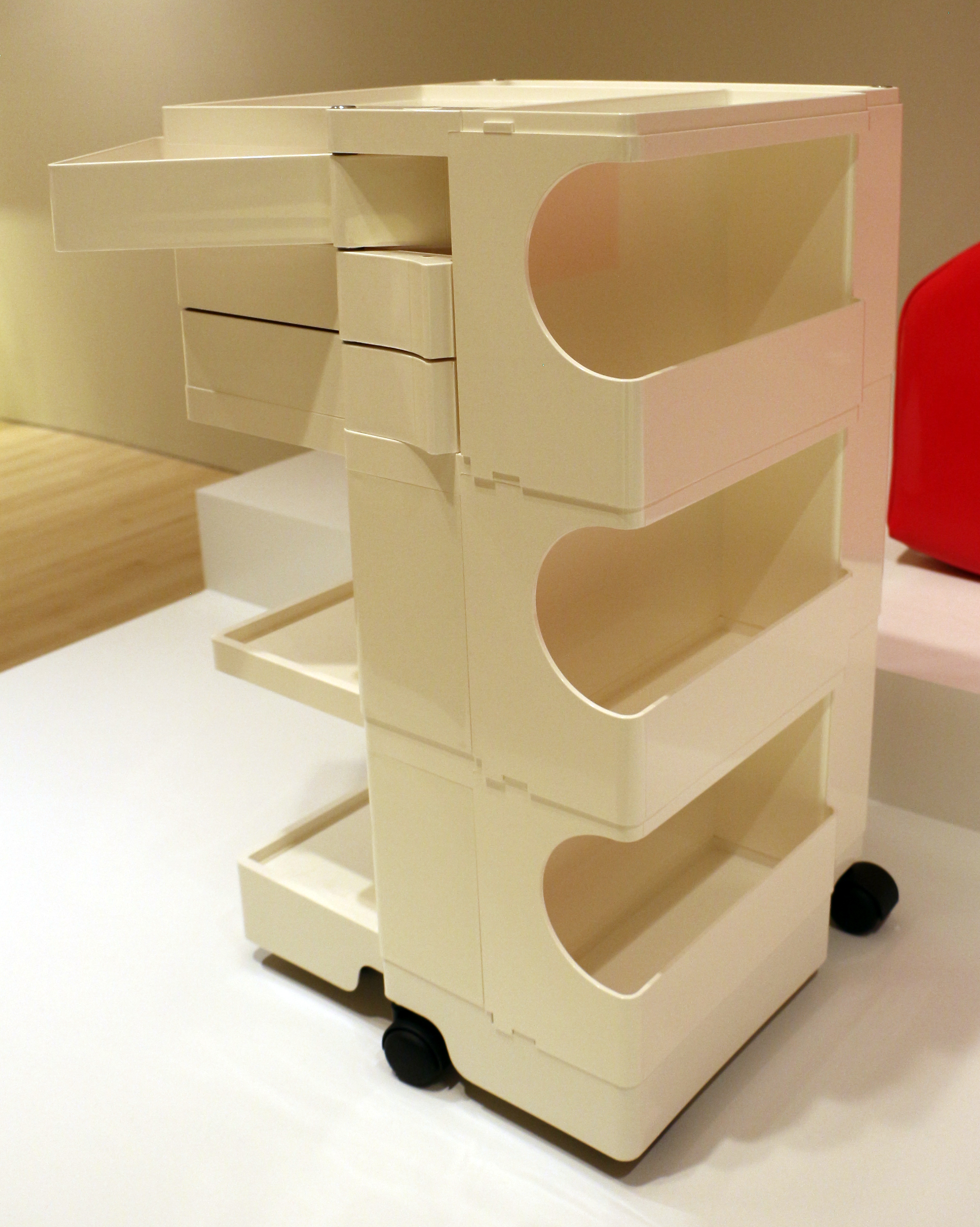
Boby 3 portable storage system, Bieffeplast (1969)

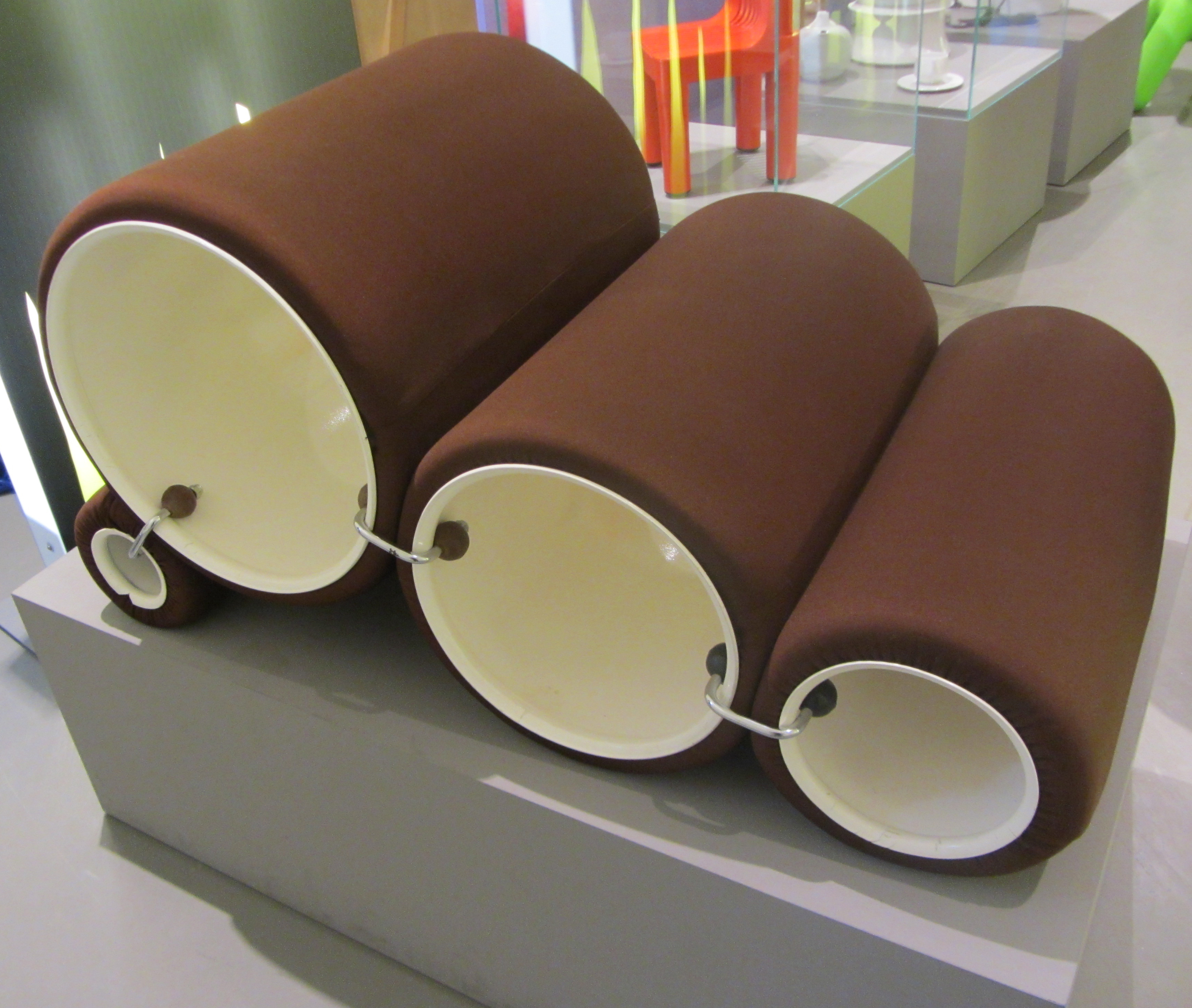
Tube chair, Flexform (1969–1970

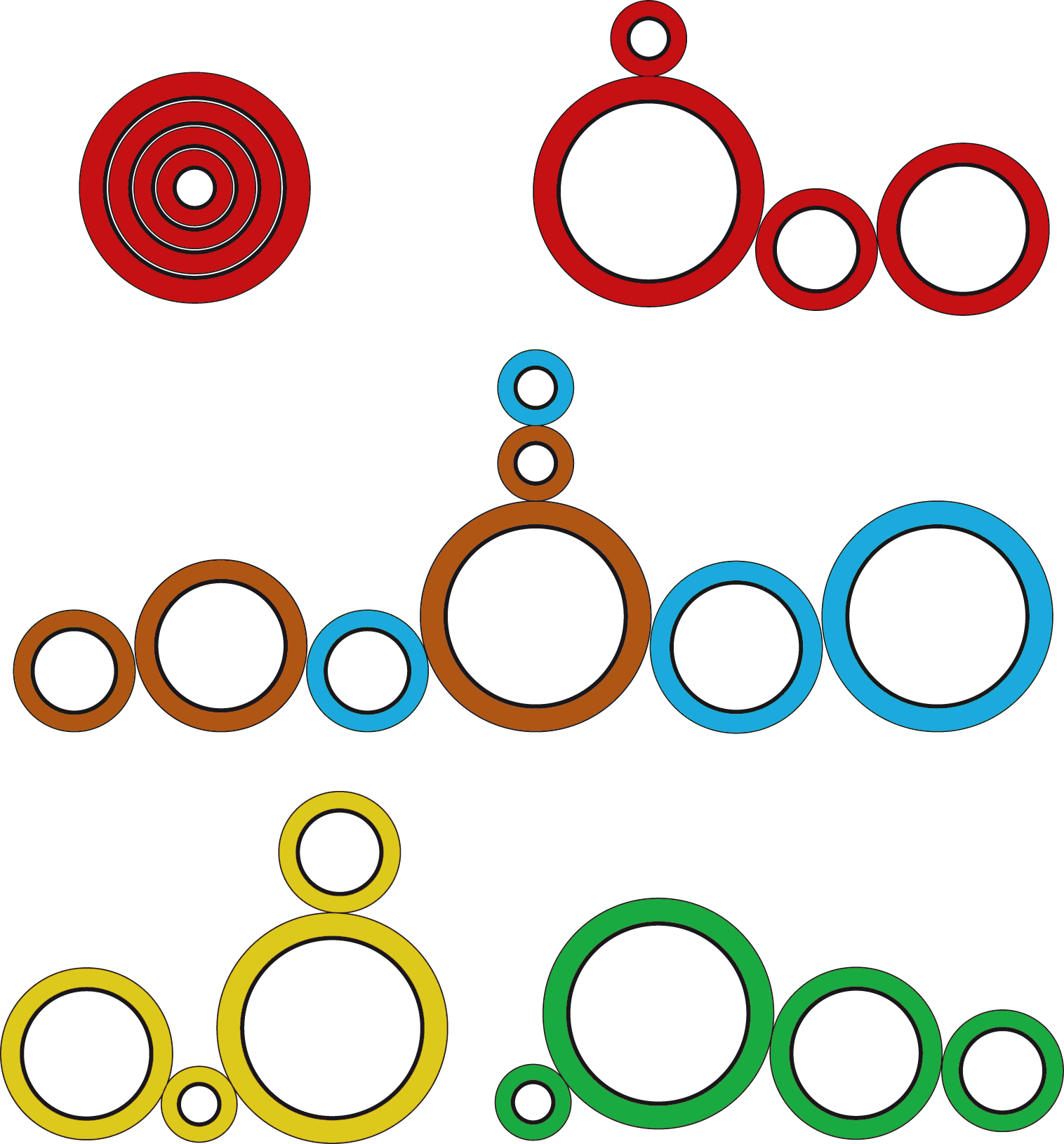
Graphic showing Tube chair, modularity and flexibility

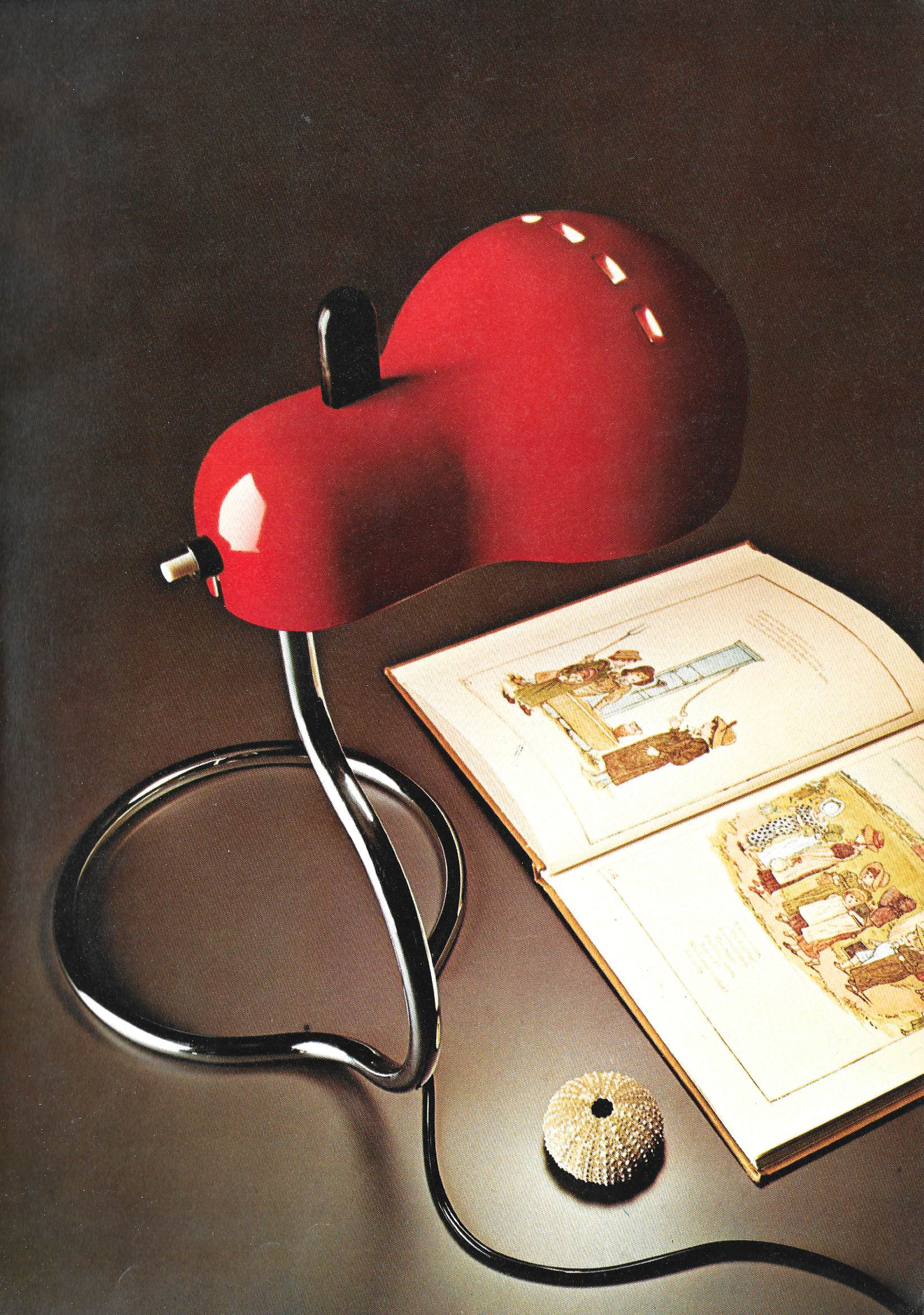
Topolino table lamp, Stilnovo (1970)

Together with his brother Gianni, Colombo developed the idea of prismatic lamps like the lamp Acrilica(1962). His first design for Kartell was the chair No.4801 (1963–1967), which consisted of three assembled plywood elements. The flowing elements of his chair were a foretaste of his later plastic designs, like the chair universale No.4860 (1965–1967), which was the first seating for adults made of ABS.

Moreover, Colombo produced innovative designs for furniture, lamps, glass, doorknobs, pipes, alarm clocks, and wristwatches. He created the professional camera Trisystem (1969), the air conditioner Candy (1970), dinnerware for Alitalia (1970; still in use), as well as an ergonomic and engine-driven printing table.

From the beginning of his career, Colombo was most interested in living systems. His early modular container Combi-Centre of 1963, is an example of that. This preference for furniture systems led to designs like Additional Living System (1967–1968) and the chairs Tube (1969–1970) and Multi (1970), which could be assembled in various positions to get a great number of sitting positions. They reflect Colombo's main goal: variability.

His futuristic designs were integrated micro-living worlds. His Visiona-Livingroom of the future was exhibited at the Visiona-Exhibition of 1969. This room consisted of "Barbella-like" space interiors where furniture became structural elements and vice versa. Traditional furniture was replaced by functional elements like the sitting cubes Night-Cell and Central-Living as well as the Kitchen-Box, to create a dynamic, multifunctional living space. The kitchen-box (1963), on wheels and measuring 90x75x75cm, containing a two-burner stovetop, oven, grill, refrigerator, cutting board, pull-out worktop, and storage for cookbooks, knives, and other tools, has recently been reissued, slightly enlarged (96 cm(h)x107cmx65cm), manufactured by Boffi Spa.

In 1963, Joe Colombo designed the Elda armchair for the Italian brand Comfort. This armchair was a pioneering example of a large armchair crafted from moulded fibreglass. Joe Colombo took the inspiration for Elda from a visit to a shipyard.

For his own apartment, Colombo designed the units Roto-living and Cabriolet-Bed (both 1969), followed by Total Furnishing Unit, which was presented at the exhibition Italy: The Domestic Landscape at the Museum of Modern Art, New York in 1972. It presented a complete "living-machine," comprising kitchen, wardrobe, bathroom, and sleeping accommodation, on only 28 square meters.

- The Elda Chair (1963)
- The Brillio Chair (1971)
- The Topo Lamp (1970)

== Exhibitions ==
His work has been exhibited in museums, among them the Museum of Modern Art in New York.

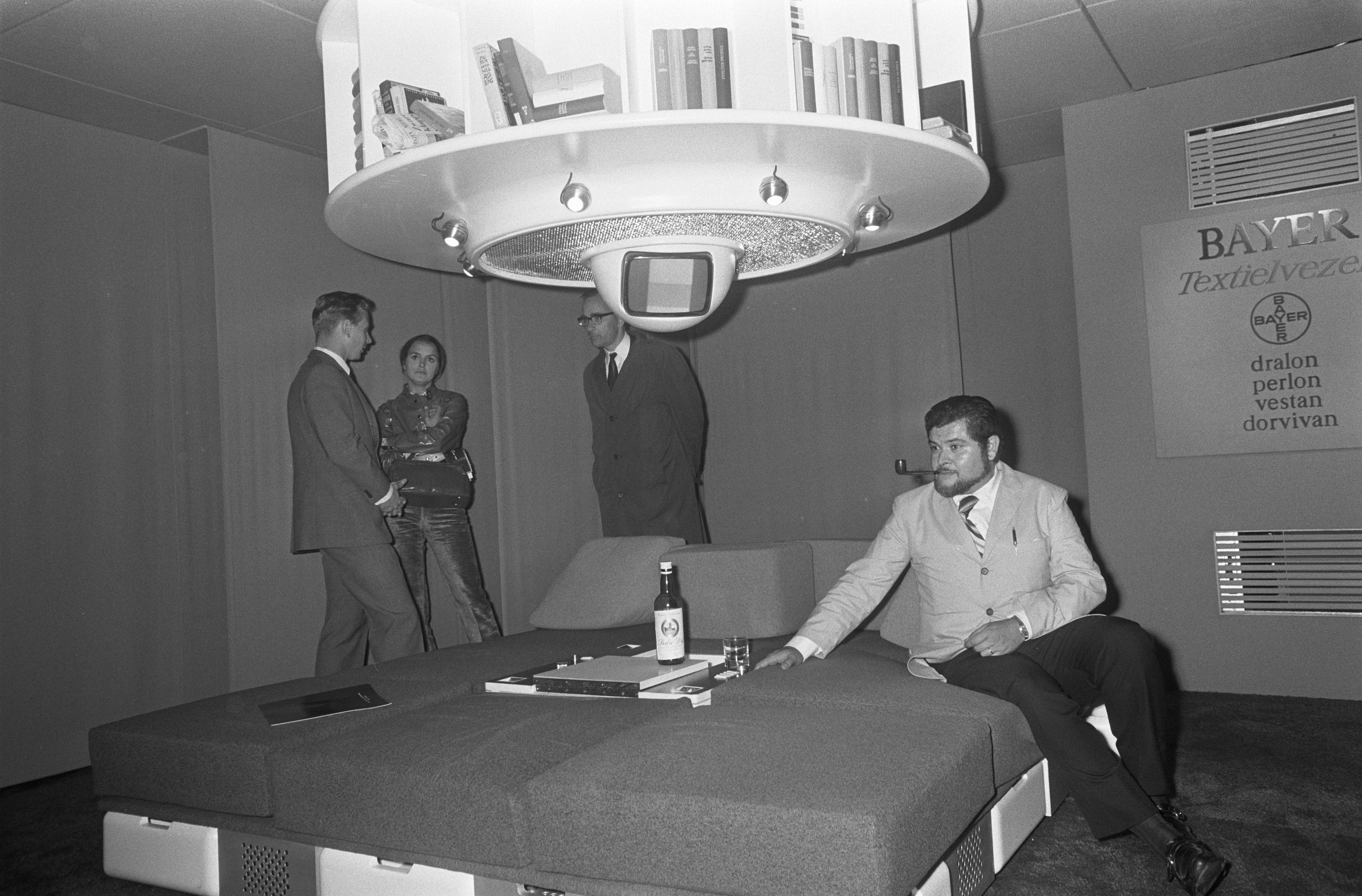
Colombo photographed at a home textiles exhibition, Utrecht, Netherlands (1960s)

== Awards ==
In 1964 Colombo received the IN-Arch prize for his room conception of a hotel in Sardinia (1962–1964). In 1967 and 1968, he was awarded ADI (Associazione per il Disegno Industriale) prize. In 1970 he received the Compasso d'Oro award.

== Publications ==
- Kries, Mateo, ed. (2005). Joe Colombo: l'invenzione del futuro (in Italian). Milano: Skira. ISBN 88-7624-474-3. OCLC 61894828.
