= Sergio Savarese =

Italian furniture designer

Sergio Savarese (1958 in Naples, Italy – September 15, 2006, in Moffat County, Colorado, United States) was a furniture designer and a founder of Dialogica furniture stores.

Savarese had studied to be a geologist. He went to Africa and spent seven years doing soil analysis to help farmers determine which crops to plant.

His career as a designer happened by accident. After Savarese returned to Italy, he designed a folding stool. Once those went into production, he began designing other pieces.

Savarese met his wife, Monique, at Milan's Domus Academy. The two were married in 1987, and together they began to design contemporary furniture distinct from the spare or historical aesthetics popular in the late 1980s. Savarese and his wife designed pieces that reinterpreted classical styles and used vibrant colors.

The couple's designs were praised at the first International Contemporary Furniture Fair in New York City. They began producing furniture at a factory in The Bronx and opened a retail store on Broome Street in Manhattan's SoHo neighborhood.

That store, Dialogica, was one of the first retailers in SoHo to feature contemporary furniture designs. The store later expanded to Los Angeles.

Savarese, a pilot, was killed in the crash of a single-engine plane in Colorado. Ivan Luini, founder of Kartell U.S. Inc. and a friend of Savarese, also died in the crash.
