= Flexform =

Italian furniture company

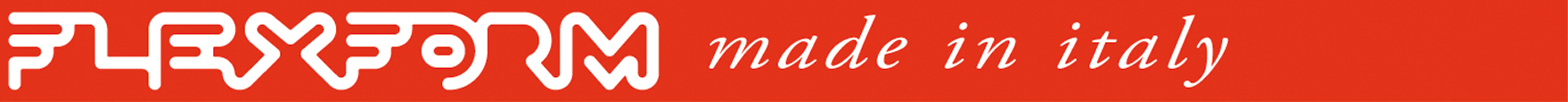
- Type: SpA
- Industry: design furniture;
- Founded: 1959
- Headquarters: Meda, Italy
- Key people: Agostino, Pietro e Romeo Galimberti
- Products: sofas, sectional sofas, armchairs, tables and chairs, ottomans and complements;
- Number of employees: 150
- Website: www.flexform.it

Flexform SpA is an Italian company with its head office in Meda, Italy, at the centre of the furniture production district of La Brianza. Founded in 1959 by the Galimberti brothers, the company designs, produces and markets furniture and furnishing accessories for residential and public use.

== History ==
In the early 20th century the Galimberti family opened an artisan workshop to build armchairs and sofas. In 1959 brothers Romeo, Pietro and Agostino Galimberti decided to call the activity Flexform di Galimberti, marketing their products in the local area.

In 1967 it became a public limited company and was transformed from an artisan workshop into an industrial firm. Collaborations began with Italian architects and creatives, many of whom destined to become the protagonists of Italian design.

In 1969 Flexform entrusted the study of the brand to Pino Tovaglia, the graphic designer who designed the Pirelli brand in the same years, while designer Joe Colombo created the Tube Chair armchair, which was subsequently exhibited in the permanent collection of the Museum of Modern Art (MoMA) in New York. Also the Boomerang lounge chair, designed by Rodolfo Bonetto is part of the MoMA collection.

From the 1970s Flexform began to export abroad. Participating in the Cologne Furniture Fair in Germany, it made its name on the markets of Northern Europe. There followed years of economic expansion in Europe, which prompted the second generation of the Galimberti family to broaden its commercial horizons to the countries across the ocean. With the entry of the third generation, in the late 1990s exports were consolidated to Brazil, Russia, China, the USA and the countries of the Far and Middle East.

In the meantime the need grew to further diversify the offer to satisfy the tastes of the emerging markets. So 2001 saw the launch of Flexform Mood, a new collection of products with an international and retro style, initially coordinated by US designer John Hutton.

In 2019, the company launched its outdoor line. Flexform is a company with an entirely family-run governance. It employs a workforce of more than 150 individuals, and its production facility covers an area of 30,000 m2. All production continues to be carried out exclusively in Italy, in Meda, to ensure the product is genuinely Made in Italy.

== Designers ==
Over the years, a number of designers and architects have been involved in the study of new products, including: Asnago-Vender, Sergio Asti, Cini Boeri, Joe Colombo, Paolo Nava, Rodolfo Bonetto, Gigi Radice, Giulio Manzoni and, more recently, Carlo Colombo, Roberto Lazzeroni, Christophe Pillet, Patrick Norguet, Fumie Shibata, Sebastian Herkner and Monica Armani. Coordination of the entire collection is entrusted to Antonio Citterio, who is also responsible for designing a large part of the company’s products. Over 40 years the entire collection has been coordinated by architect Antonio Citterio.

== Award ==
A.B.C.D. armchair designed by Antonio Citterio has been awarded Honorable Mention by Associazione per il disegno industriale for the XXIV Compasso d’Oro (2016).

For its 29th edition, the Association for Industrial Design has presented the Compasso d’Oro Lifetime Achievement Award to Pietro and Antonio Franco Galimberti.

== Bibliography ==
- Giovanni Albera, Nicolas Monti, Italian modern: a design heritage Rizzoli, ISBN 978-0-84781034-5
- Nally Bellati, New Italian design, Rizzoli, ISBN 978-0-84781258-5
- Giampiero Bosoni, Italian Design, Museum of Modern Art, ISBN 978-0-87070738-4
- Andrea Branzi, Design italiano, 1964-1990, Electa, ISBN 978-884355375-4.
- Andrea Branzi, Introduzione al design italiano: una modernità incompleta, Baldini Castoldi Dalai, ISBN 978-886073071-8
- Juli Capella, Quim Larrea, Designed by architects in the 1980s, Ed. Rizzoli - ISBN 9780847809417
- Giulio Castelli, Paola Antonelli, Francesca Picchi, La fabbrica del design: conversazioni con i protagonisti del design italiano, Skira
- Charlotte e Peter Fiell, 1000 Chairs, Taschen ISBN 978-884355375-4
- Laura Lazzaroni, 35 anni di design al Salone del Mobile, Cosmit
- Mario Mastropietro, Rolando Gorla, Un'industria per il design, Lybra immagine, ISBN 88-8223-035-X
- Sergio Campo dall'Orto, Imprese eccellenti. Le aziende milanesi che non temono la crisi, Franco Angeli ISBN 885681801-9
- Massimo Pitis; Cristina Dell'edera, Pino Tovaglia. La regola che corregge l'emozione, Edizioni Corriani
- Jim Postell, Furniture Design, John Wiley & Sons, ISBN 978-1-11809078-7
- Maria Cristina Tommasini, Mario Pancera, Il design italiano: protagonisti, opere, scuole, Editoriale G. Mondadori
- Antonio Marazza, Stefania Saviolo, Lifestyle brand: Le marche che ispirano la nostra vita, Ed. Rizzoli Etas - ISBN 9788858623756
- Alberto Bassi, Antonio Citterio: industrial designer, Ed. Electa Architecture - ISBN 9781904313366
- Bernd Polster, Claudia Neumann, Markust Schuler, Frederick Leven, The A-Z of modern design, Ed. Merrell
- Pippo Ciorra, Antonio Citterio, Terry Dwan, Antonio Citterio, Terry Dwan: ten years of architecture and design - Ed. Birkhäuser Verlag - ISBN 978-376435597-5
- Silvana Annicchiarico, Andrea Branzi, Barbara McGilvray, John Venerella, Che cosa è il design italiano? : le sette ossessioni del design italiano, Ed. Triennale Electa - ISBN 978-88-370-5981-1
- Carlo Ducci, Luxury in living, Ed. Electa - ISBN 9788837034894
- Mel Byars, Terence Riley, The design encyclopedia, London King, ISBN 978-0-87070012-5

== See also ==
- List of Italian companies
