= Kartell =

Italian designer furniture company

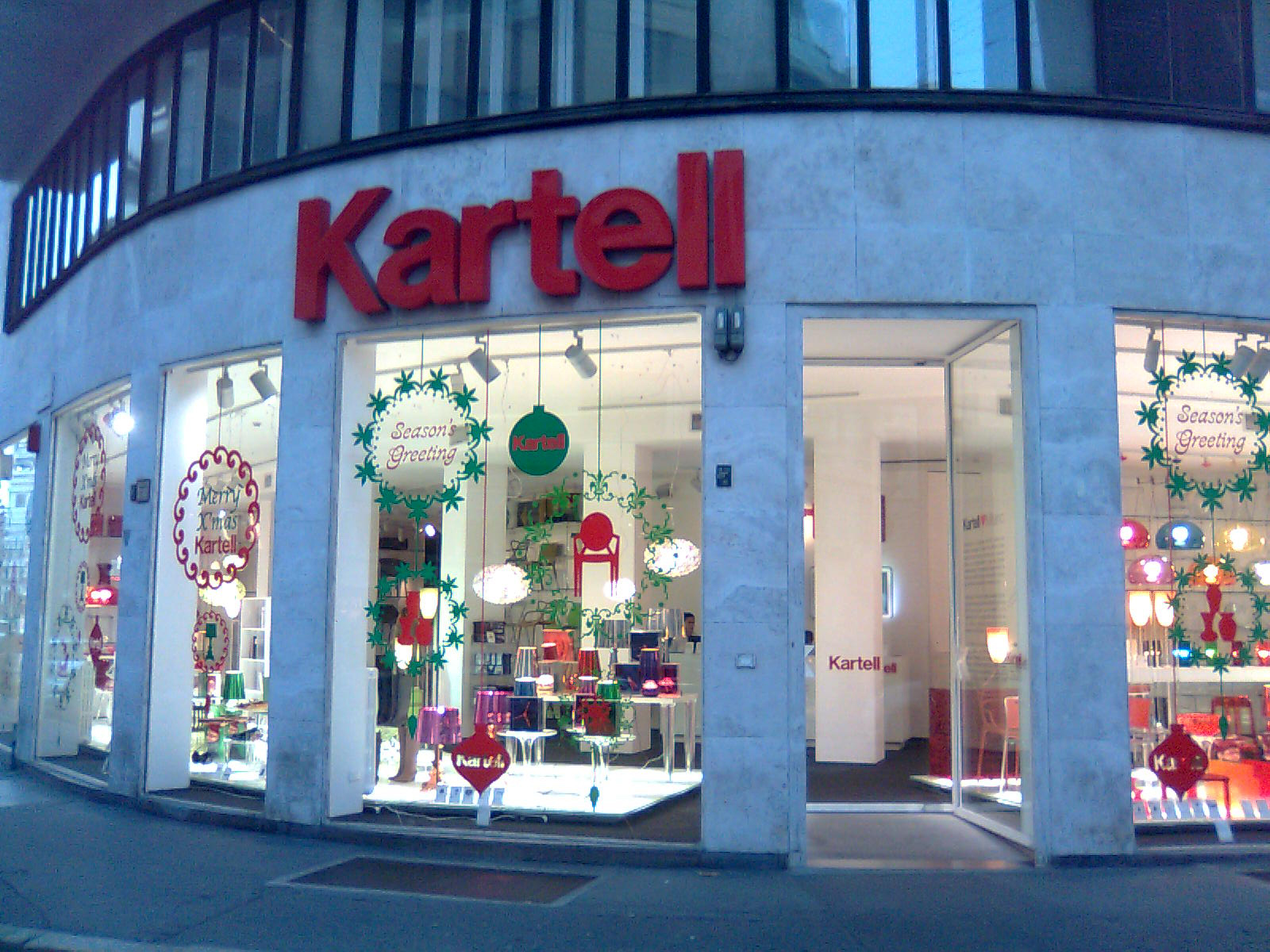
- Kartell store in Via Turati in Milan
- Company type: Private
- Founded: 1949
- Founder: Giulio Castelli
- Headquarters: Noviglio, Italy
- Key people: Claudio Luti (Chairman, CEO & President)
- Owner: Felofin
- Website: www.kartell.it

Kartell is an Italian company that makes and sells plastic contemporary furniture. It is headquartered in Noviglio, Metropolitan City of Milan, Italy, and it is a subsidiary of Felofin.

== History ==
The company began manufacturing automobile accessories in 1949. It expanded into home furnishings in 1963. It was founded by Giulio Castelli. Kartell became well-known due to the work of designer and architect Anna Castelli Ferrieri.

The company opened its first store in the United States in 1998, when a Kartell U.S. outlet opened on Greene Street in New York City. Ivan Luini, president of the U.S. division at that time, oversaw the opening of additional stores in Miami, San Francisco, Atlanta, Boston and Los Angeles.

Kartell's retail marketing strategy is to stock items in various styles and colors at prices that appeal to impulse buyers. The company grosses $100 million per year. In addition to its stores, Kartell furnishings are sold by more than 150 independent retailers in the United States.

At the time of his death, Luini was in discussions for Kartell's plastic furnishings to be used in a hotel chain being designed by Philippe Starck.

The company is a subsidiary of Felofin. Its chairman, chief executive officer and president is Claudio Luti. The current designer for the company is Ferruccio Laviani, who has created a style described by Pianeta Design as "Bourgiemania".

== Gallery ==
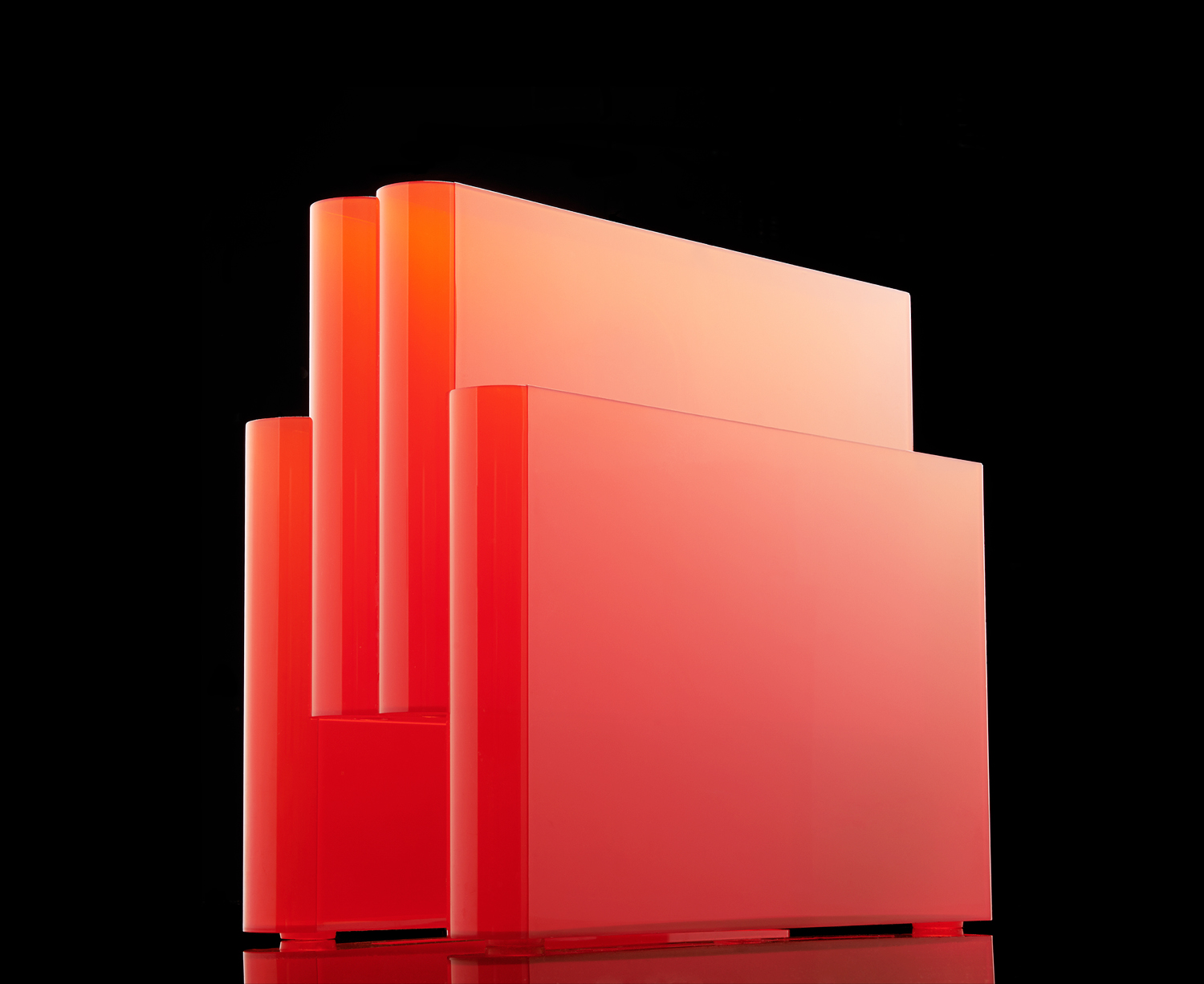
Kartell Stoppino Magazine Rack

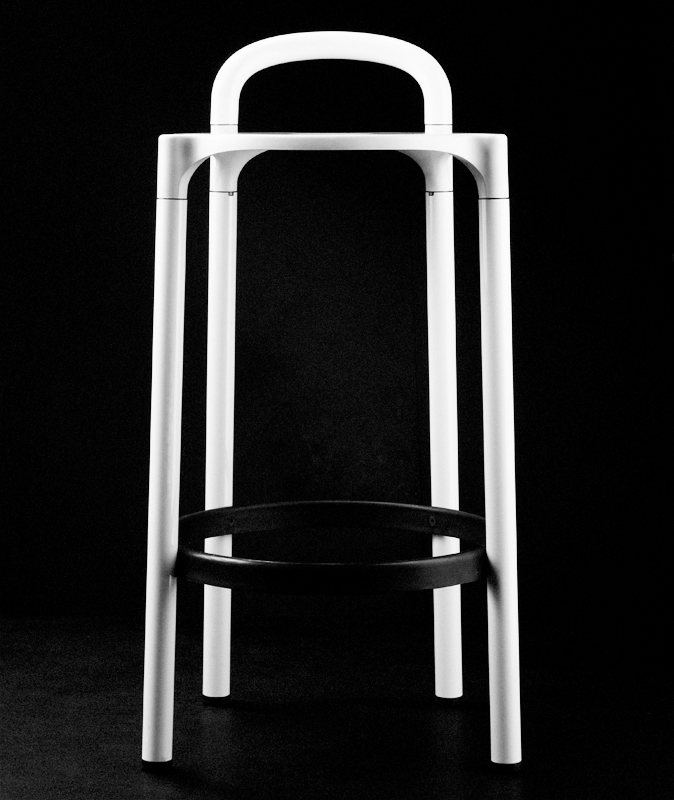
Kartell Anna Castelli Stool

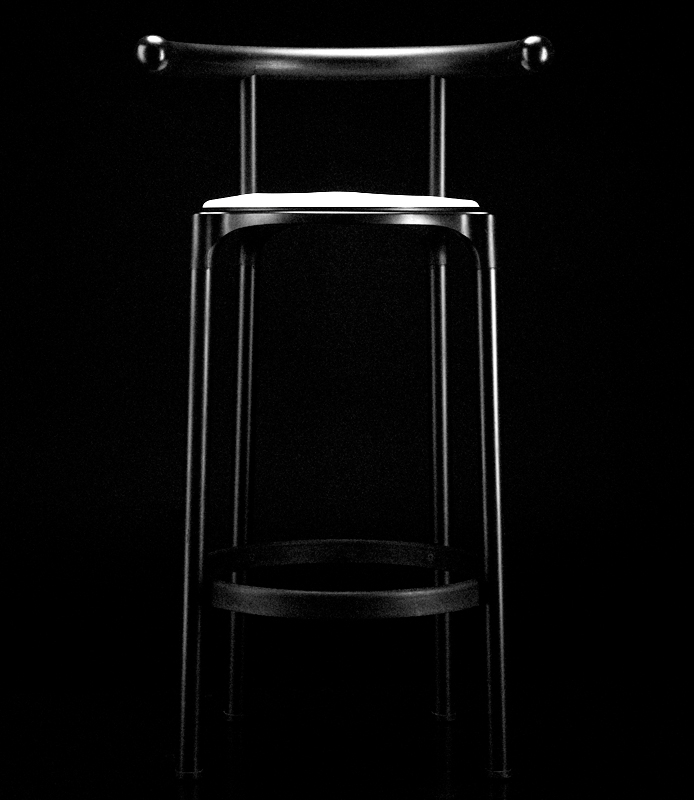
Kartell Anna Castelli Stool

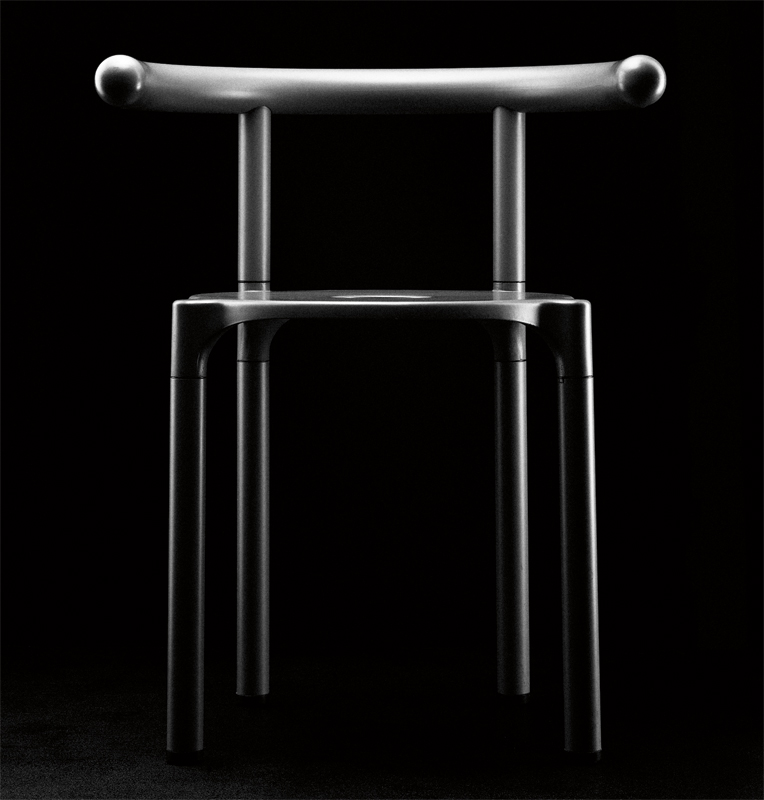
Kartell Anna Castelli Chair

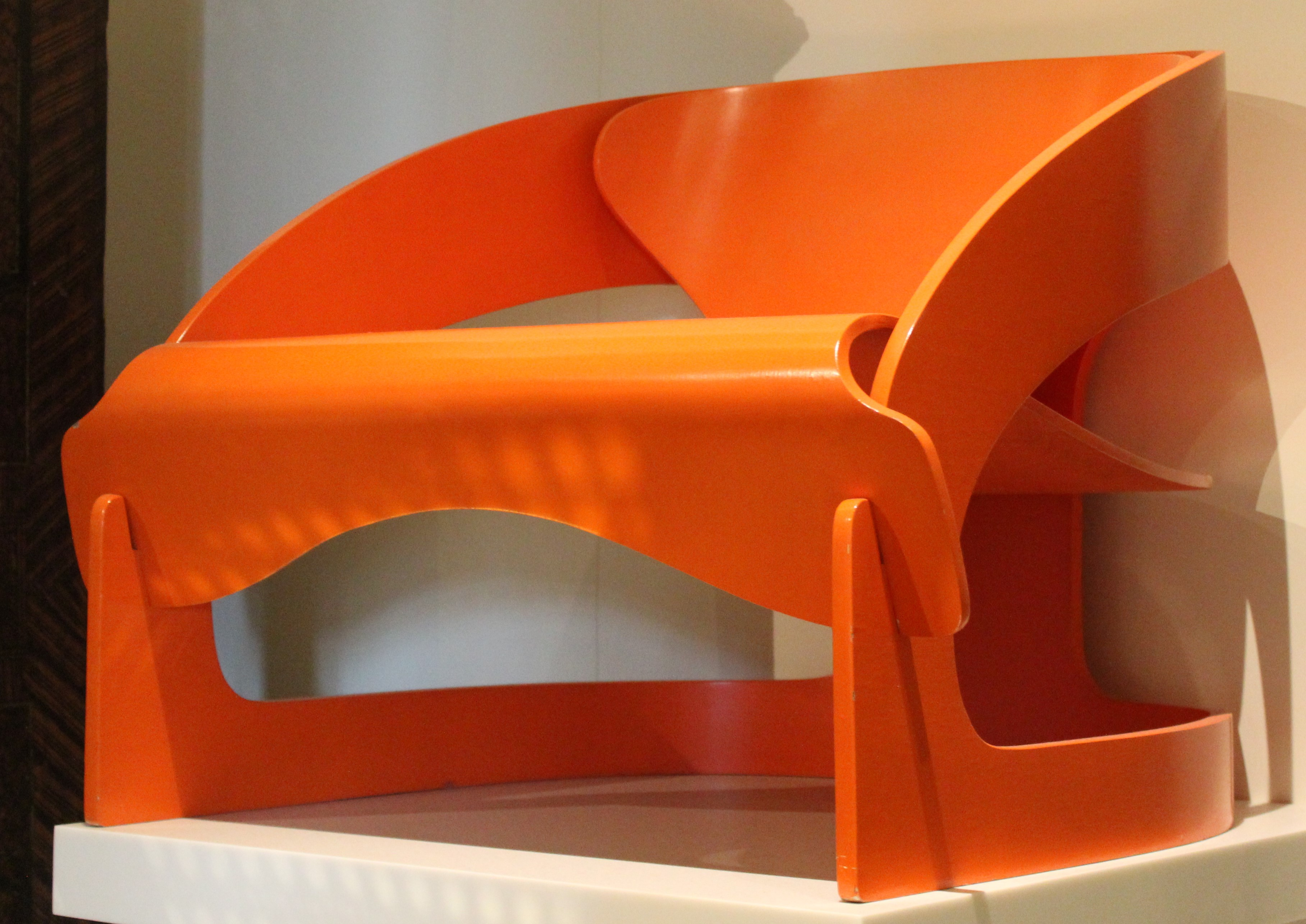
Model 4801 armchair by Joe Colombo (1963)

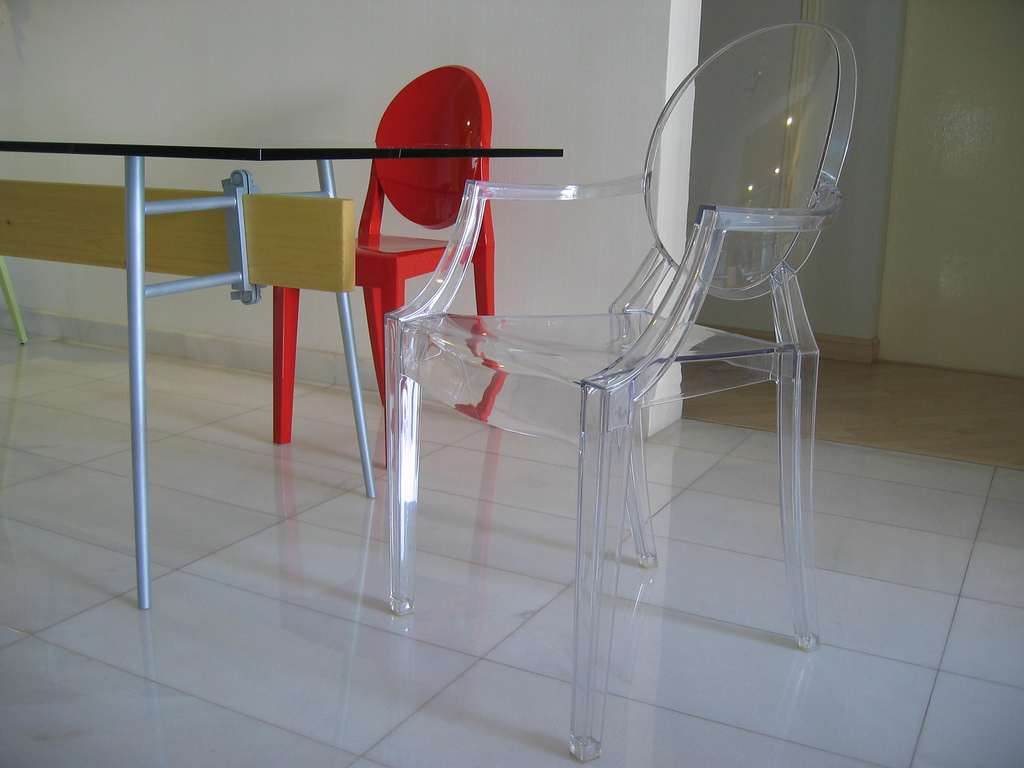
Chairs designed by Philippe Starck for Kartell: a transparent "Louis Ghost" in the foreground and a red "Victoria Ghost" in the background

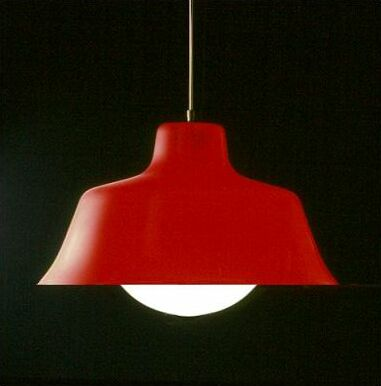
Kartell Lamp, 1954

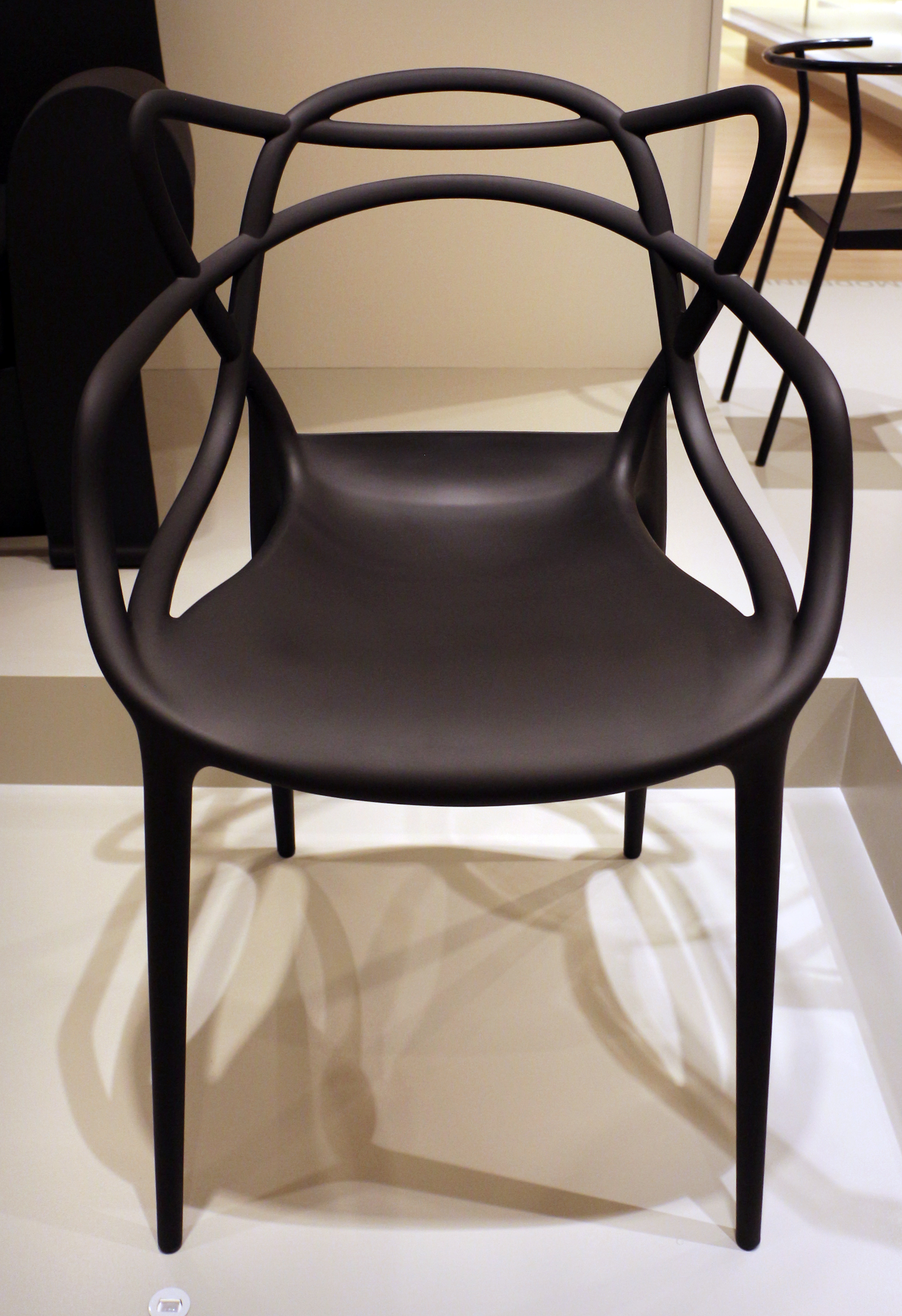
Masters chair by Philippe Starck and Eugeni Quitllet

== See also ==
- List of Italian companies
- Sergio Savarese
