= Arrigo Polillo =

Italian journalist

Arrigo Polillo (Pavullo nel Frignano, 12 July 1919 – Milan, 17 July 1984) was an Italian journalist, editor, writer and jazz critic.

== Biography ==
Arrigo graduated in law in Milan, where he practiced law until he became manager of the Mondadori publishing house. He remained Mondadori's manager until 1968. He was the editor-in-chief of Musica Jazz magazine from its foundation in 1945 and became its director in 1965, a role which he retained until his death in 1984. The annual award assigned by Musica Jazz magazine to the best Italian jazz record is named after him (Arrigo Polillo Award).

The organizer of many jazz festivals (including the International Jazz Festival of Sanremo, 1956–1965) and hundreds of concerts, he wrote several books on jazz, of which the most popular to date is Jazz — la vicenda e i protagonisti della musica afro-americana. In 1978, he published with Mondadori a book of jazz memoirs, Stasera Jazz (Jazz Tonight), which was reprinted in 2007 by the publishing house founded by his son, Marco Polillo Editore, in 1995. After his death, his family donated his collection of records, books and magazines to Siena Jazz. His collection became the founding heritage of the National Centre for Jazz Studies "Arrigo Polillo".

== Selected publications ==
- Enciclopedia del Jazz (The Encyclopedia of Jazz), Messaggerie Musicali Editions, 1954 (co-authored with Testoni, G.C.; Barazzetta, G.; Leydi, R.; Maffei, P.)
- Il Jazz Moderno — Musica del dopoguerra (Modern Jazz — post-war music), Ricordi, 1958
- Il Jazz di Oggi (Today’s Jazz), Ricordi, 1961
- Jazz — la vicenda e i protagonisti della musica afro-americana (Jazz — the story and the protagonists of African-American music), Mondadori, 1975; second edition espanded, Milano, Oscar Mondadori, 1983; new edition edited by Marco Fayenz, Mondadori, 1997.
- La storia del jazz (The history of jazz), five audiocassettes, Mondadori, 1976
- Le voci del jazz (The voices of jazz), two audiocassettes, Mondadori 1977
- Stasera Jazz (Jazz Tonight), Mondadori, 1978; Marco Polillo Editore, 2007
- Polillo, Roberto & Polillo, Arrigo, Swing, Bop & Free — il jazz degli anni 60 (Swing, Bop & Free — the jazz of the ‘60s), Marco Polillo Editore, 2006
