= Cast Courts =

Galleries in the Victoria and Albert Museum

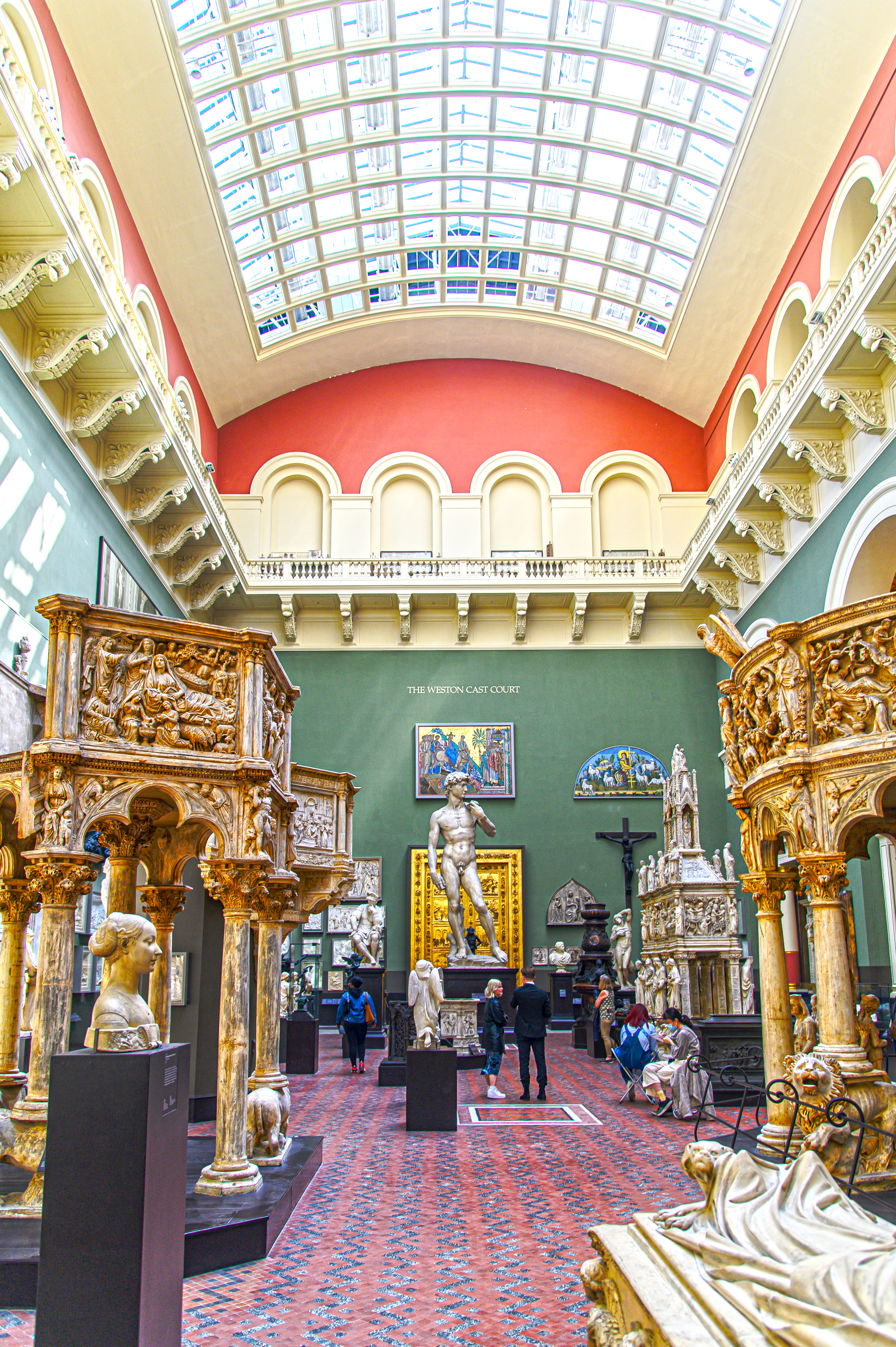
- The Weston Cast Court (Room 46b)
- Building: Victoria and Albert Museum
- Location: South Kensington, London
- Country: UK
- Coordinates: 51°29′49″N 0°10′16″W
- Area: c. 800 m²
- Named for: Nirmal Sethia (Corridor Gallery); Garfield Weston (East Court); Paul Ruddock (West Court)
- Architect: Henry Scott

The Cast Courts (originally the Architectural Courts) comprise Rooms 46, 46a and 46b of the Victoria and Albert Museum in London, England. The ensemble of these galleries houses a collection of reproductions made from some of the most well known and recognisable European statues, reliefs, and architectural ornamentation, as well as copies of various smaller decorative objects, memorials, and motifs. Most of the plaster casts were made in the 19th or early 20th century, and some of are better preserved than the originals, being protected from harm caused by pollution, overzealous conservation, or other misfortune. A few examples, such as the museum's cast of a late 15th century relief of Christ washing the Apostles' feet, are unique records—as the original works from which they were created have been either lost, damaged, or destroyed.

== History ==
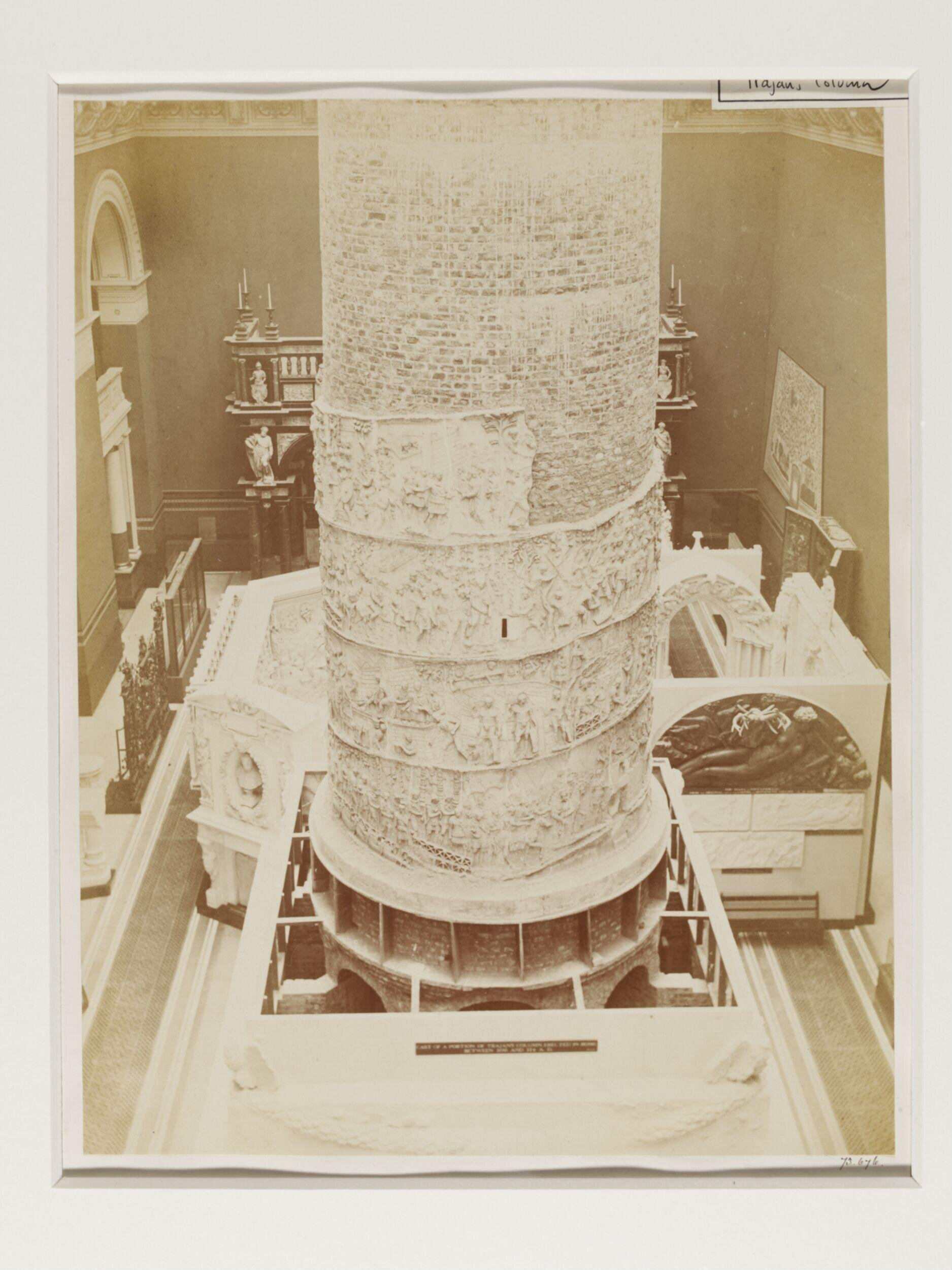
Isabel Agnes Cowper photograph showing the V&A's replica of Trajan's Column being assembled on its underlying brick "chimney" structure, 1873

The practice of reproducing famous sculptures in plaster dates back at least to the sixteenth century, when the sculptor Leone Leoni assembled a large private collection in Milan. He gathered "as many of the most celebrated works ... carved and cast, antique and modern as he was able to obtain anywhere", however such collections generally remained modest and were uncommon.

By the 19th century there was a growing interest in medieval, gothic, and renaissance art at an institutional level. Perhaps as an expression of patriotic pride—particularly in France and the Germanic countries, casts were made of outstanding national treasures, and extensive public collections were displayed in Paris, Berlin, Vienna, and elsewhere. In contrast to these initiatives, the V&A's cast collection was conceived as being international in scope from its inception. Many of the casts were directly commissioned by the museum or purchased from Italian, French, and German firms, with additional examples obtained via exchanges with other museums. The collection was continuously expanded throughout the second half of the 19th century.

From 1841 onwards, reference examples of art from all periods and countries were collected by the Government School of Design (a precursor to the Royal College of Art). In 1852 these works were moved to the Museum of Manufactures, as the V&A was then known, when it was established at Marlborough House. By 1858 the museum had relocated to its current location in South Kensington, and the casts were displayed in various galleries and corridors.

By around 1860, the previously haphazard means of acquisition was supplemented by a more systematic approach. A list was drawn up of copies it was thought desirable to acquire, and soon plans were made to house them. As with the acquisition of original sculptures and other works in the V&A’s collection, this initiative was driven primarily by the museum's director Henry Cole and curator John Charles Robinson.

The collection grew significantly in 1862 with the acquisition of over 2,000 casts of decorative wood carving that had been used as examples for the craftsmen working on the new Westminster Palace.

In 1864, plans for an international exchange of copies of "the finest works of art which each country possesses" were drawn up by Henry Cole and the assistance of the Foreign Office was sought to obtain lists of major works in the possession of other European nations. This ambitious scheme culminated with 15 European princes being persuaded to sign up to the International Convention of Promoting Universally Reproductions of Works of Art at the Paris International Exhibition of 1867. With this agreement, the Victoria and Albert Museum came to acquire the large and diverse collection of casts and other reproductions that are now displayed in the Cast Courts and elsewhere in the museum.

The Cast Courts opened in July 1873. According to Cole's diary entry from the time, they were "Generally much approved". The galleries were also described in somewhat less restrained terms by Moncure Conway as "an excursion round the world!"

More recently, as part of the museum's long-term "FuturePlan" redevelopment programme the Cast Courts were extensively renovated (the East court in 2014, and the West Court and central galleries in 2018).

== Location and characteristics ==
The Courts were designed by Major General Henry Scott of the Royal Engineers and are located on the east side of the building adjacent to the Korea galleries, and the Medieval and Renaissance collection (Rooms 47g and 50b respectively). They were completed and opened to the public in July 1873. The spaces are architecturally dramatic, richly detailed, large and high-ceilinged.

The West Court (officially the Ruddock Family gallery; Room 46a) is topped by a vaulted glass roof that admits abundant natural light. This gallery predominantly contains the museum's cast of Trajan's Column, as well casts of Northern European and Spanish sculpture and architectural elements. It is said that the proportions of the West Court were determined by the need to display Trajan's column and the imposing Portico de la Gloria.

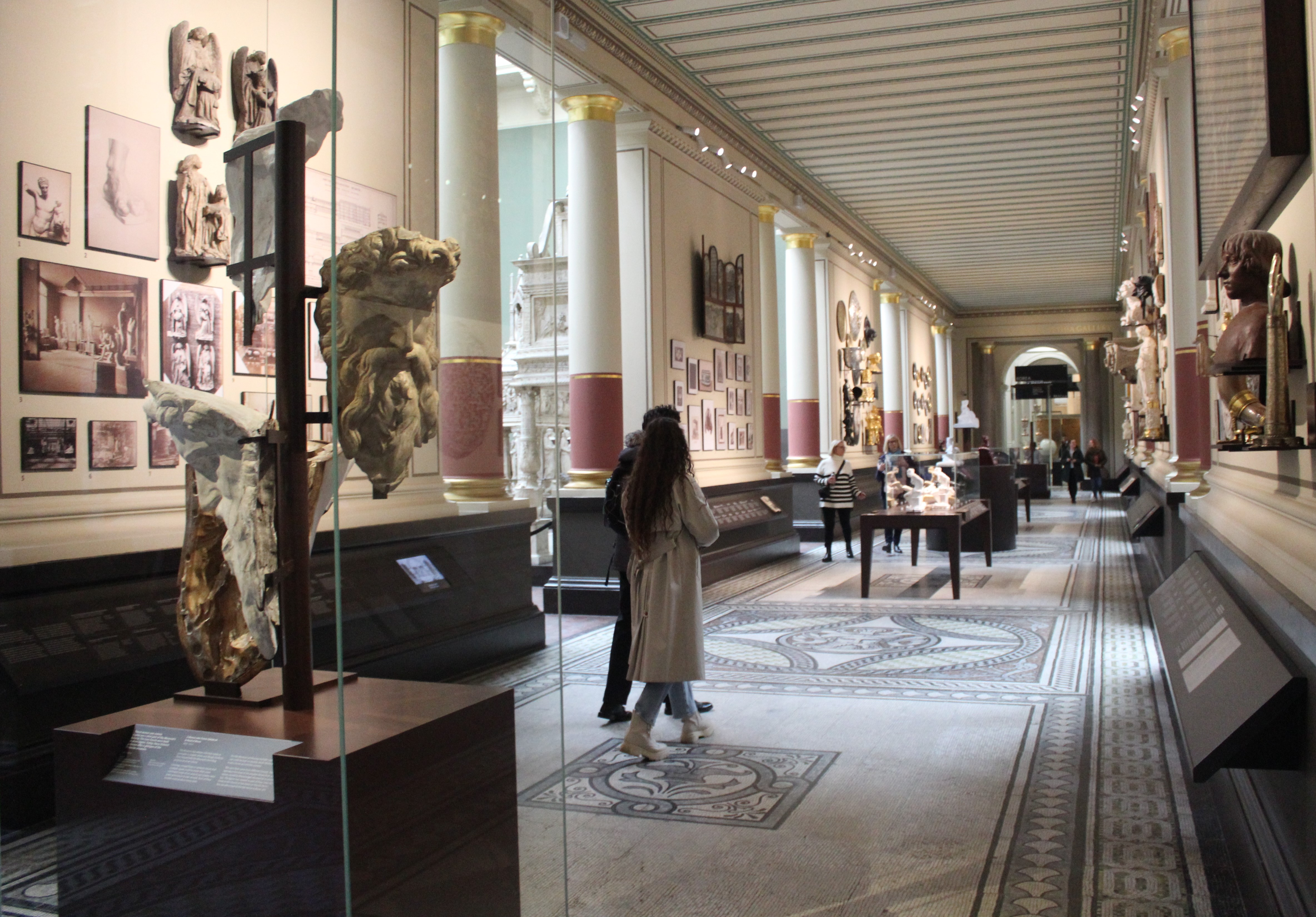
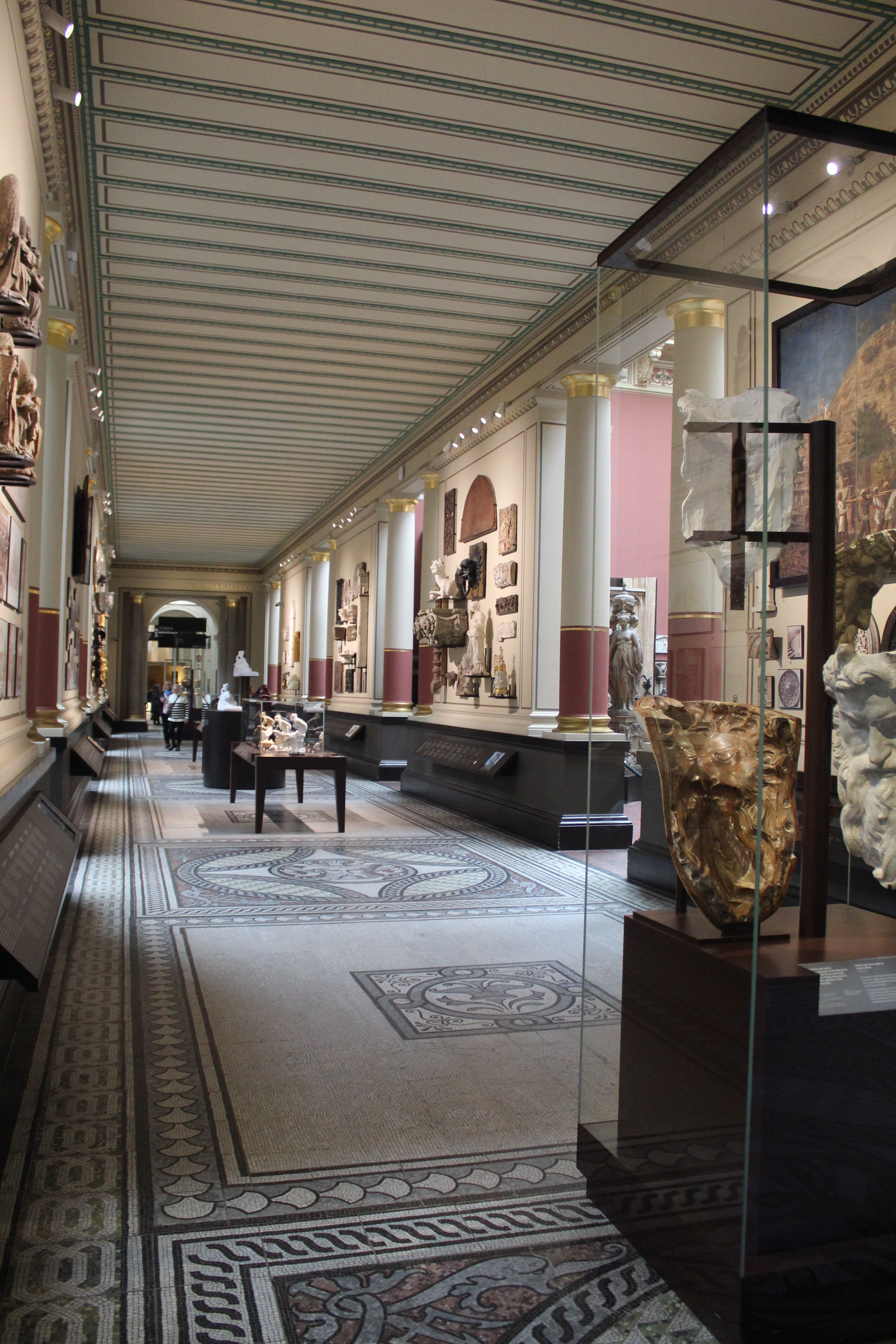
View of the Central Gallery (Room 46) showing displays of various works, as well as its position relative to the larger East Court (left), and West Court (right).

The East Court (officially he Weston Cast Court; Room 46b) houses mostly casts of Italian monuments, notably the V&A's copies of the Porta Magna of San Petronio Basilica and Michelangelo's David. The East Court is similarly proportioned to the West Court, and also has a very high ceiling and skylights.

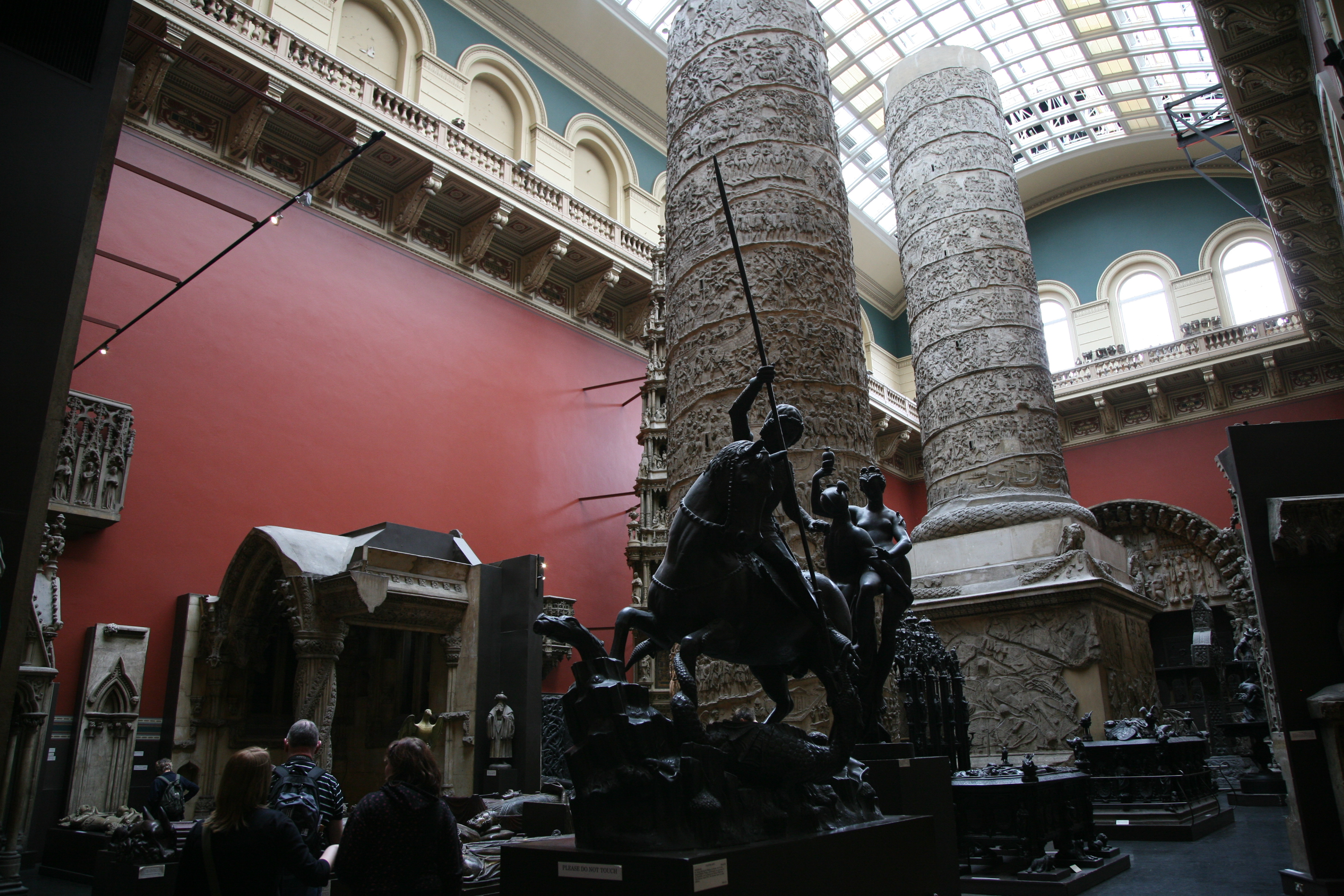
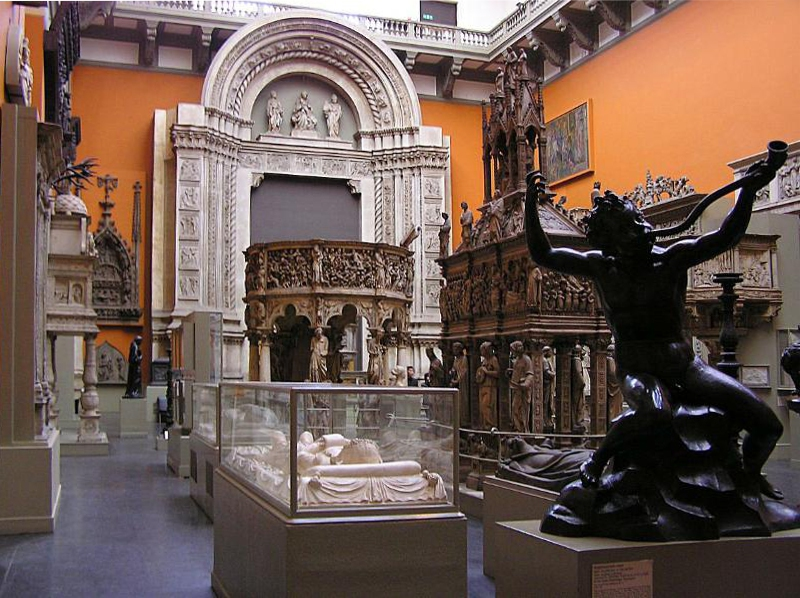
View of the West Court (Room 46a) showing Trajan's Column, and the East Court (Room 46b) showing Porta Magna of San Petronio Basilica.

The two main galleries are divided by central corridor galleries on two levels (including Room 46, officially the Chitra Nirmal Sethia Gallery); the mid-level mezzanine (Room 111) allows both of the larger galleries to be viewed from above. Both courts also have vertiginously high walkways that are contiguous with the third level of the central galleries, a space which is used to store casts and other objects that are not on display (some pieces from the museum's cast collection are also displayed in the Daylit Gallery). Neither the upper walkways nor the adjacent storage areas are open to the public.

When the Cast Courts first opened, they included displays of large scale architectural models and many casts of architectural details and ornamentation, hence the original name "Architectural Courts". The initial press reaction to the Courts was mixed. The Art Journal, while generally favourable, was particularly critical of the inclusion of Trajan's Column, which it claimed had the "effect of crowding out of sight those [casts] of more sensible proportions". Other museums also received casts of the Column, but chose to display the frieze in an unrolled manner and presented at eye level, as can now be seen at the Museum of Roman Civilization and National Museum of Romanian History.

In the 1920s, discussions within the museum focused on the lack of space for display. It was suggested that the cast collection be moved to The Crystal Palace where another large collection of casts was also housed. The proposed move was rejected by the museum's then director, Eric Maclagan—which was fortuitous, as the Crystal Palace was destroyed by fire in 1936. Twenty three casts, mainly effigies that escaped the inferno, were subsequently transferred to the V&A, becoming the last major additions to the Cast Courts.

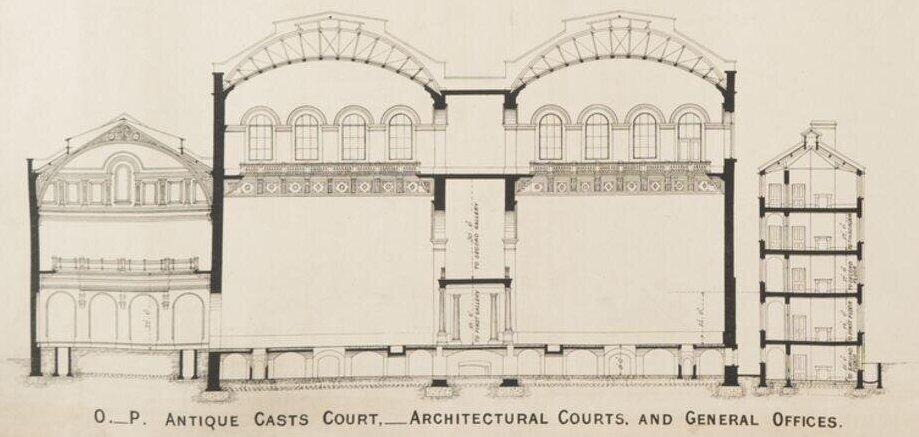
Sectional drawing of the Cast Courts showing the great height of the two main rooms, the smaller central corridor galleries, and the third level storerooms and walkways, 1888

Early in the 20th century, there was something of a reaction against copying artworks, and interest in cast collections such as the V&A's began to decline. Indeed, some of the non-European works were removed from the collection and demolished. Only more recently has revived interest in the collection led to its once again being fully appreciated. As Tristram Hunt, the museum's current director points out, through the use of "high-definition photography and scanning technologies, museums are producing millions of digital files for public use. But the Cast Courts were the first conscious attempt to reproduce and share the canon."

== Major exhibits ==
=== Trajan's Column ===
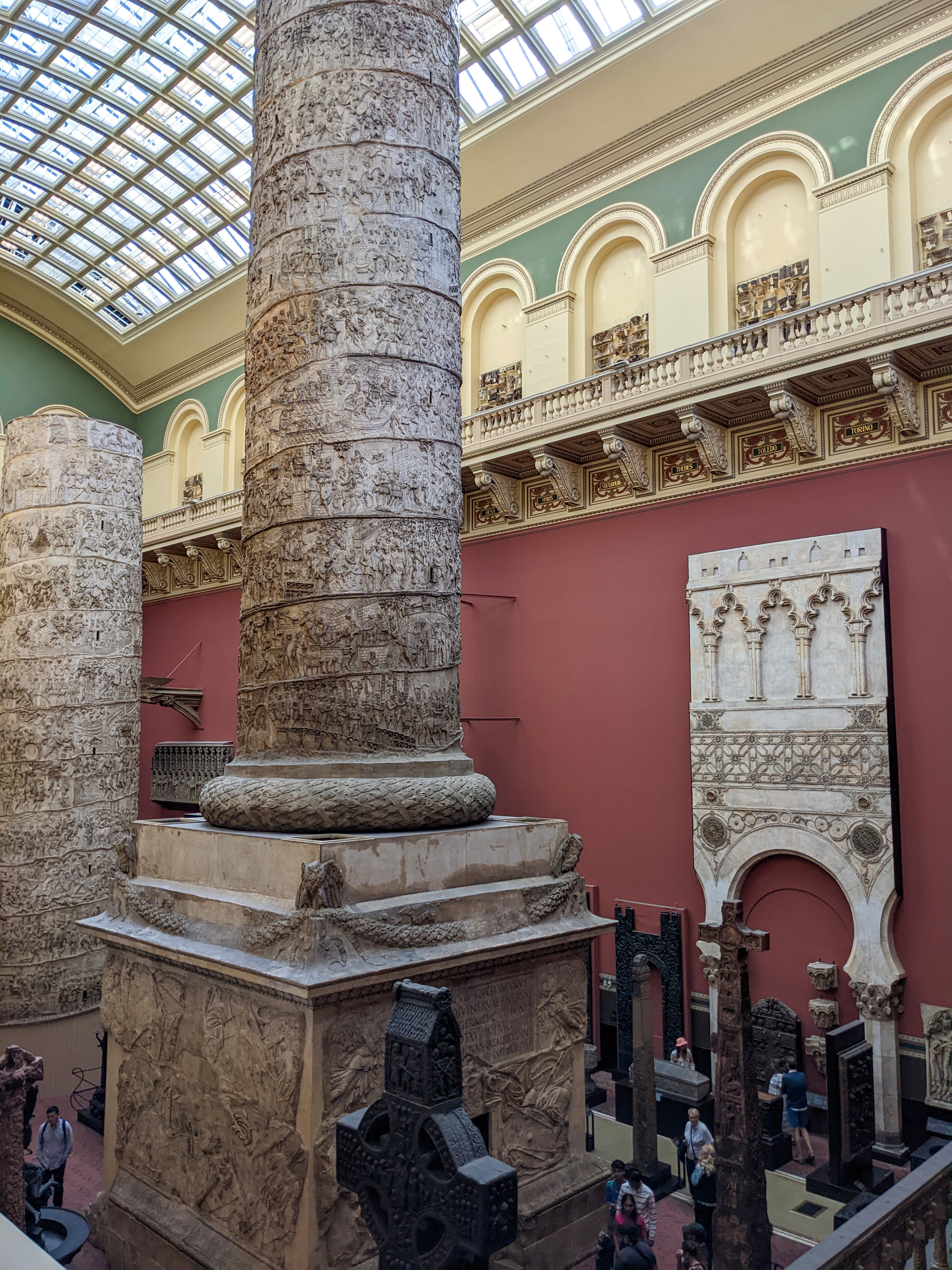
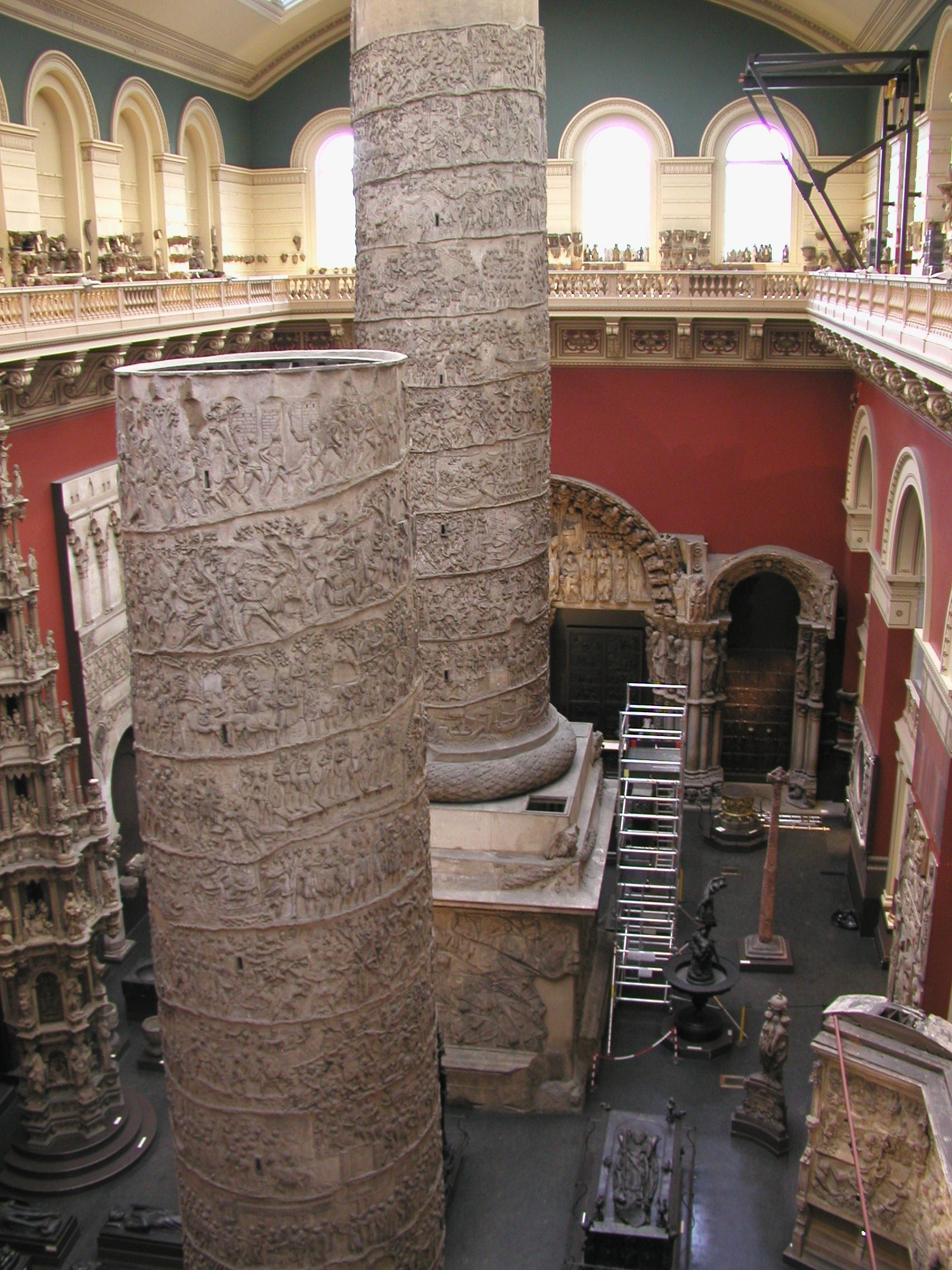
Trajan's Column viewed from the Gilbert Bayes Sculpture Gallery (Room 111), and from the upper walkway.

The full height of Trajan's Column could not possibly be accommodated and the column is divided into two roughly equal parts. The original column in Rome is some 30m high and includes an internal spiral staircase which leads to a platform at the top. The cast is of the huge pedestal and the entire column, but excludes the viewing platform. The original statue on the top was lost in antiquity.

The column's pedestal is covered in illustrations of the spoils of Trajan's Dacian Wars, and a detailed frieze illustrating the conquest spirals around the column itself. The frieze describes the two Dacian wars in narrative form; the first (AD 101–102) is illustrated on the lower portion of the column, and the second (AD 105–106) on the upper portion. The dividing point on the column is marked by a personification of Victory writing on a shield and this is approximately the point at which the cast of the column is divided.

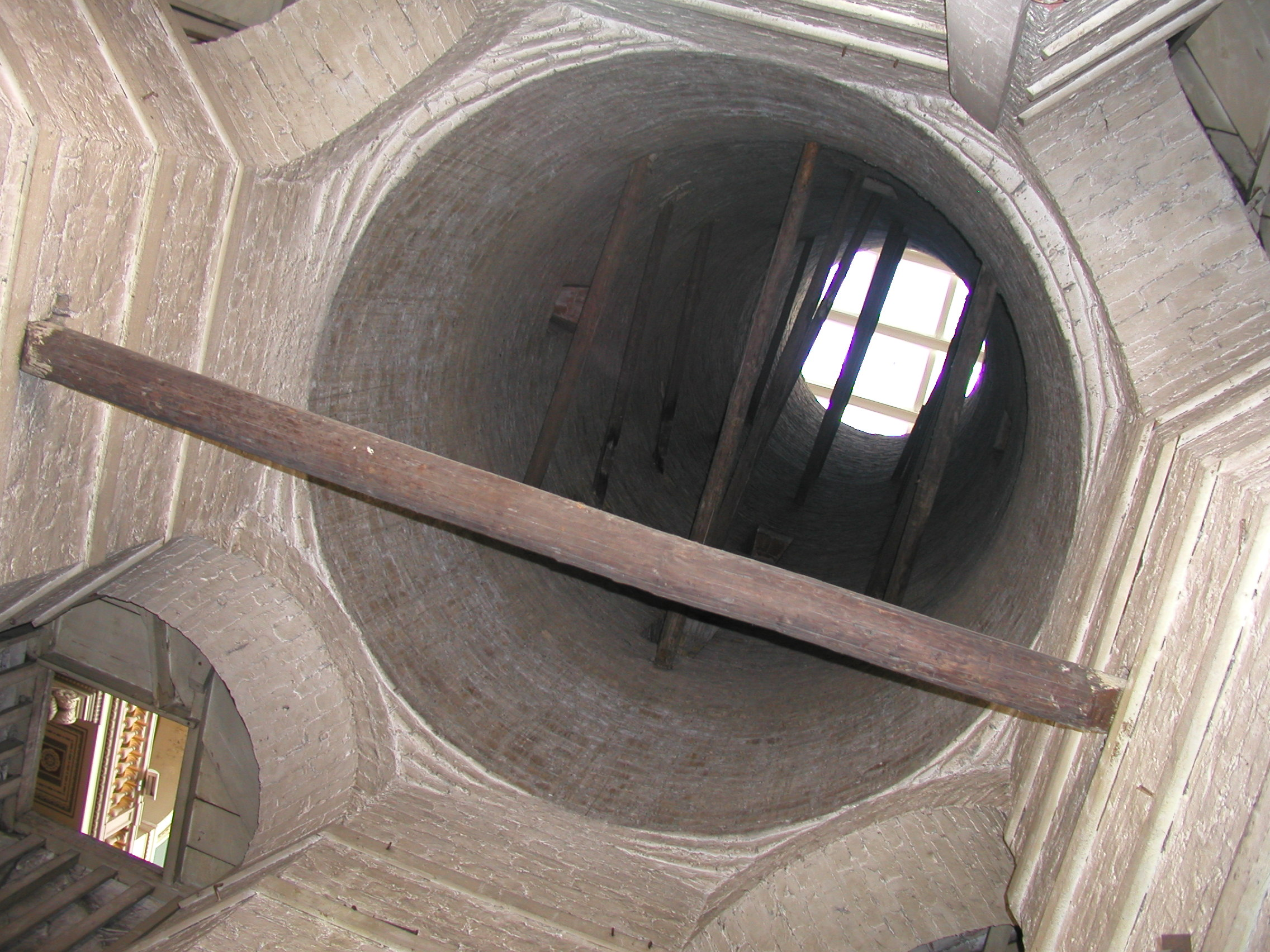
View of the column from inside of its pedestal. The West Court's vaulted glass roof can be seen through the top of the "chimney". There is also a small opening (lower left) through which the mezzanine balustrade can be seen.

The column was cast in many small parts which were then reassembled on two purpose-built chimney-like brick structures. Just as on the original, there is a door on the column's pedestal that allows access to the white painted interior of the brick chimney. The upper portion of the column is also hollow, however there is no means of access to view the interior space.

In Rome the frieze is extremely difficult to see. The viewing conditions in the museum are better, but also less than optimal. The lower section is atop a huge pedestal some 4 metres (13 ft) high. Consequently, the only part of the frieze that can be examined closely by the public is the upper portion, the bottom of which stands on the gallery's floor at eye-level. The mezzanine corridor does afford an alternative viewpoint, albeit at a distance and only from one side. The upper-level walkway looks down on the column and does provide views from all sides, although from a significant distance (and it is generally not open to the public).

=== Portico de la Gloria ===
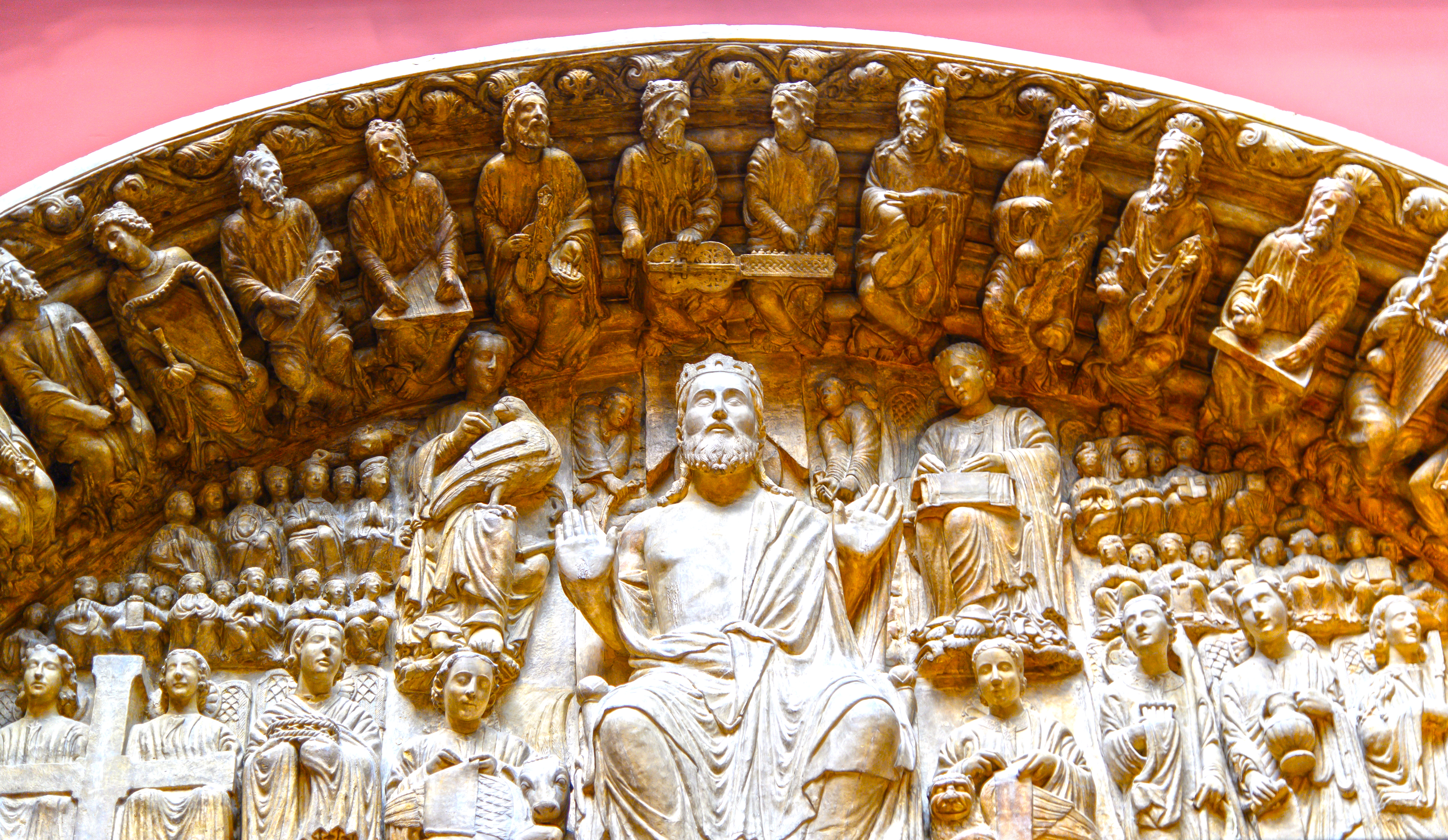
View and detail of the Portico de la Gloria

The portal, known as the Portico de la Gloria is from the Cathedral of Santiago de Compostela in Spain. The original dates from the 12th century and is by the Master Mateo. In 1865, Robinson had visited Santiago de Compostela and on seeing the cathedral urged for a cast of the doorway to be made. This was prior to the construction of the Cast Courts and so allowed for the design to accommodate this vast artefact.

The cast was commissioned by the museum in 1866. The task of making it went to Domenico Brucciani & Company, a firm that later effectively acted as a franchise of the museum and continued to make casts until the early 1920s. Brucciani and his team "remarkably completed the work in two months." The casting of this immense structure required an arduous sea voyage and protracted, delicate negotiations with the ecclesiastical authorities.

At the opening of the Cast Courts, the cast of the Portico de la Gloria was critically acclaimed and was applauded as a "glory to the museum".

=== Baptistry Doors ===
This copy is an electrotype of the Florence Baptistry Doors known as the Gates of Paradise by Lorenzo Ghiberti.

=== School of Athens ===
There is a painted copy of Raphael's The School of Athens over 4 metres by 8 metres in size, dated 1755 by Anton Raphael Mengs on display in the eastern Cast Court.

=== Pulpit from Pisa Cathedral ===
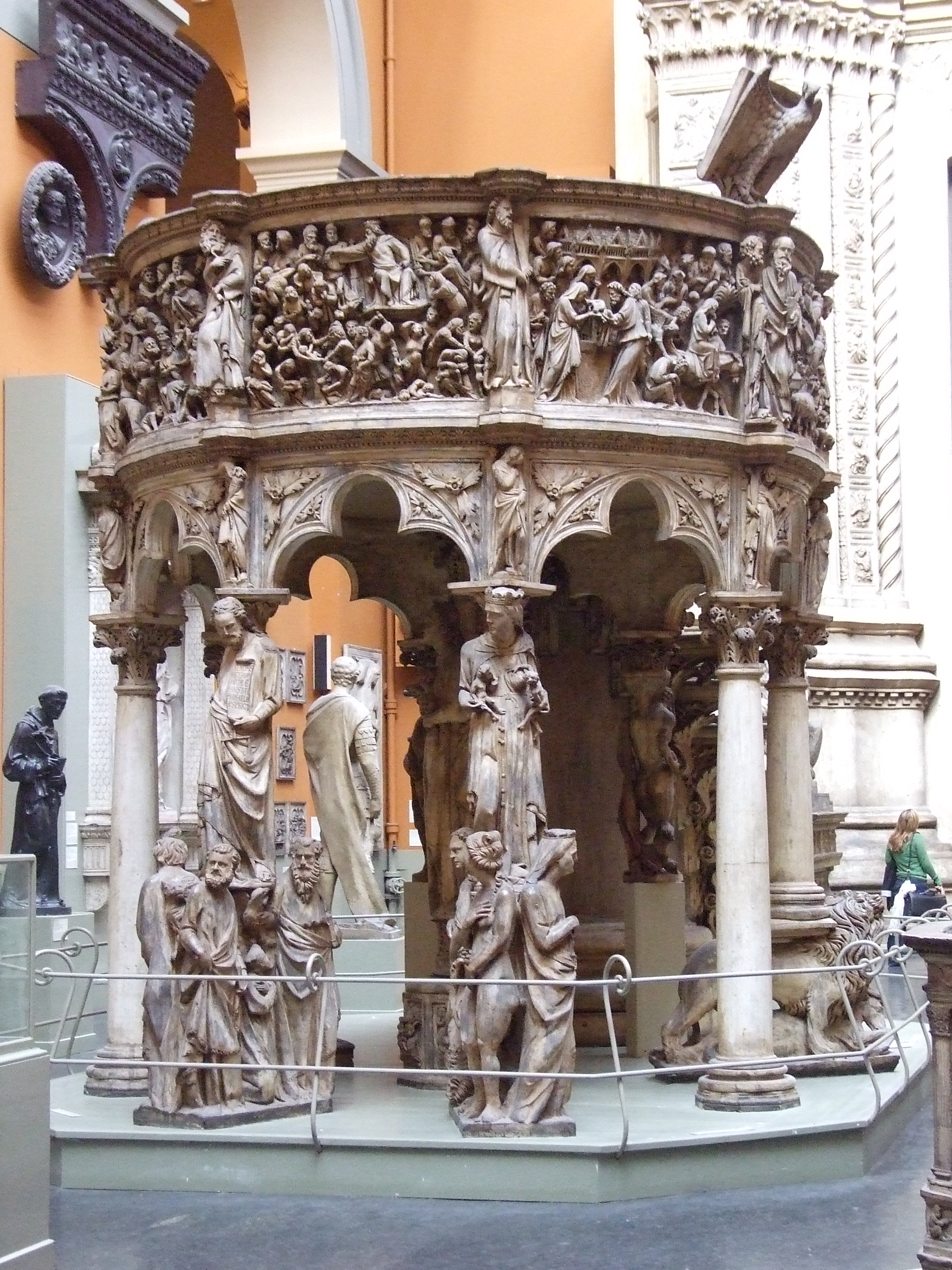
Cast of Giovanni Pisano's pulpit from Pisa Cathedral

The plaster cast of a pulpit was constructed after the marble original which once stood in the Cathedral of Pisa. The pulpit has inscriptions running round the frieze and the base that make it clear that the sculptor was Giovanni Pisano (1250–1314) and that the work was completed by 1311.

Reliefs show scenes from the life of Christ and the Last Judgment. A central support comprises images of the three Virtues over a base depicting the Liberal Arts. The two supports nearest the front of the pulpit depict Christ over the Four Evangelists and Ecclesia over the four Cardinal Virtues.

The original pulpit was dismantled in 1602 following a fire in the cathedral. A new pulpit by Fancelli was installed 25 years later, it used some of Pisano's original carvings and the rest, including the narrative reliefs, were used elsewhere in the cathedral. Interest in the original appearance of the pulpit was re-awakened in the nineteenth century. Pisan sculptor Giovanni Fontana worked on a reconstruction carved from wood and in 1865 a group of British bronze sculptors produced their own reconstruction. The two reconstructions differed in detail. This cast seems to be from this 1865 reconstruction. Another copy of this cast was shown in the Exposition Universelle in Paris in 1867.

The present pulpit in the Cathedral in Pisa is a reconstruction by Peleo Baccithat assembled in 1926. The reconstruction incorporates most of the fragments from the original although some are dispersed in museums around the world. The 1926 reconstruction differs substantially from the earlier reconstructions and has been described as problematic.

=== Three Davids ===
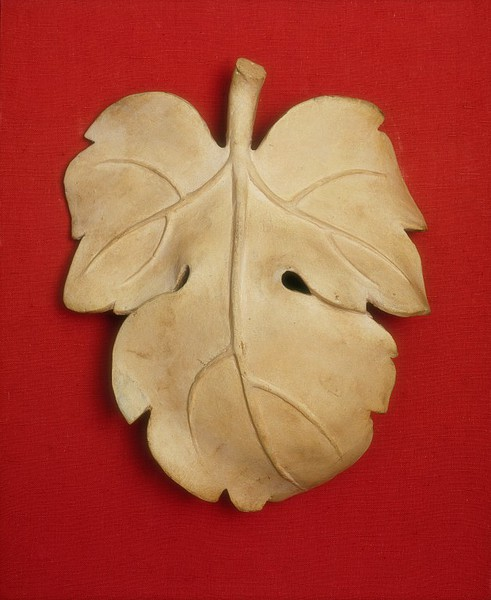
Suitably proportioned Victorian fig leaf hung to preserve dignitaries' dignity (no longer in use)

The galley houses three depictions of David. Michelangelo's David was the museum's first major cast of Italian figure sculpture. The cast was sent to Queen Victoria by Leopold II, Grand Duke of Tuscany, reportedly after he had refused to allow the National Gallery to export a painting by Domenico Ghirlandaio. Queen Victoria donated the cast to the South Kensington Museum (now the V&A) when it arrived in England in 1857.

During the Victorian era, the display of male nudity was contentious and the Queen herself was said to find it shocking. The museum commissioned a suitably proportioned fig leaf that was kept in readiness in case of a visit by the Queen or any other female dignitary: the fig leaf was then hung on the figure using a pair of hooks. Today, the fig leaf is no longer used, but it is displayed in a case at the back of the cast's plinth.

The second David is a replica of Donatello's bronze, which, apart from aesthetic considerations, is notable for being the first unsupported standing work in cast bronze made since classical times. The cast is painted to resemble the bronze of the original, which is in the collection of the Bargello in Florence. The third depiction is a cast of David by Verrocchio (the original of which is also in bronze and in the Bargello museum).

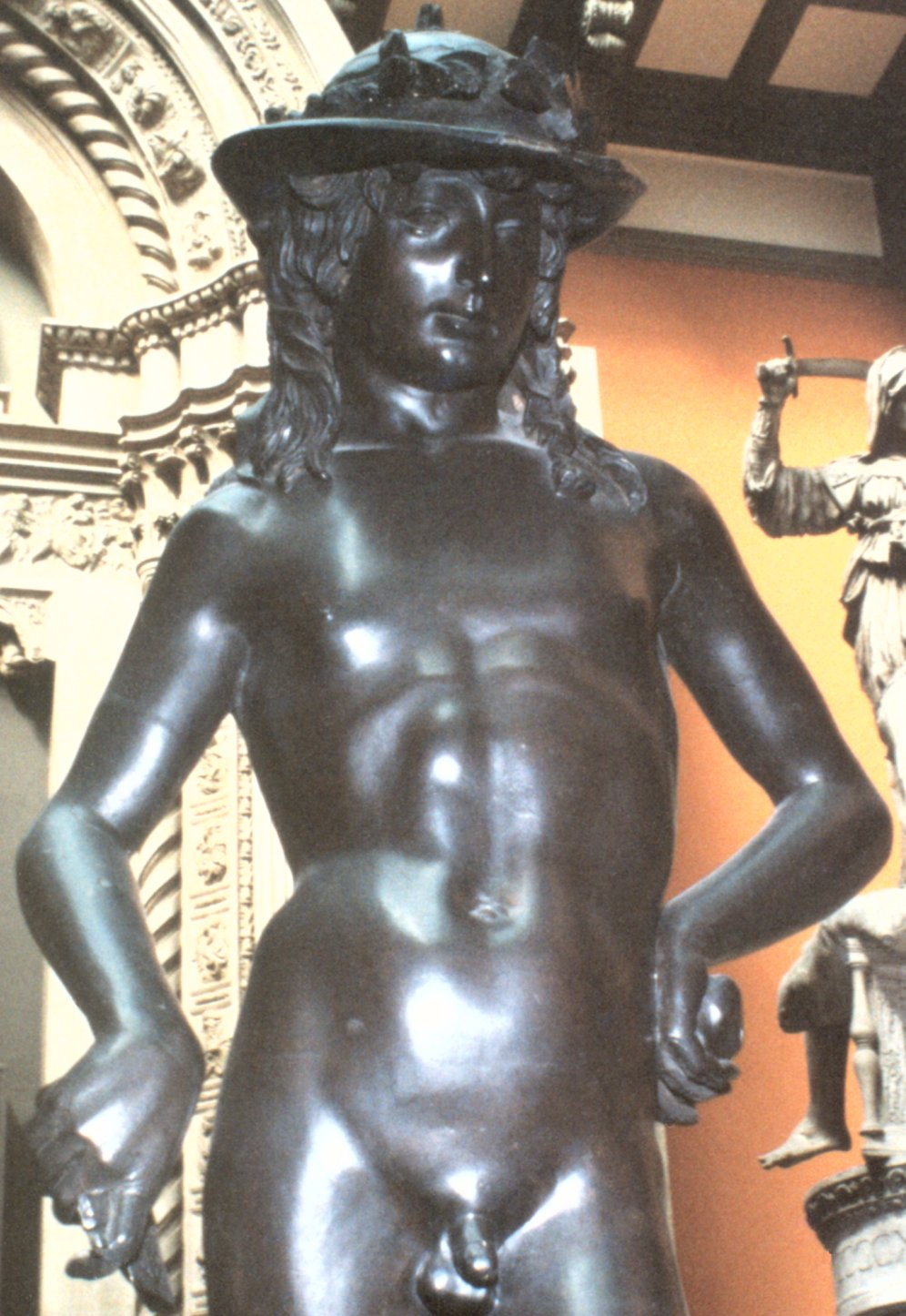
Donatello, c. 1440

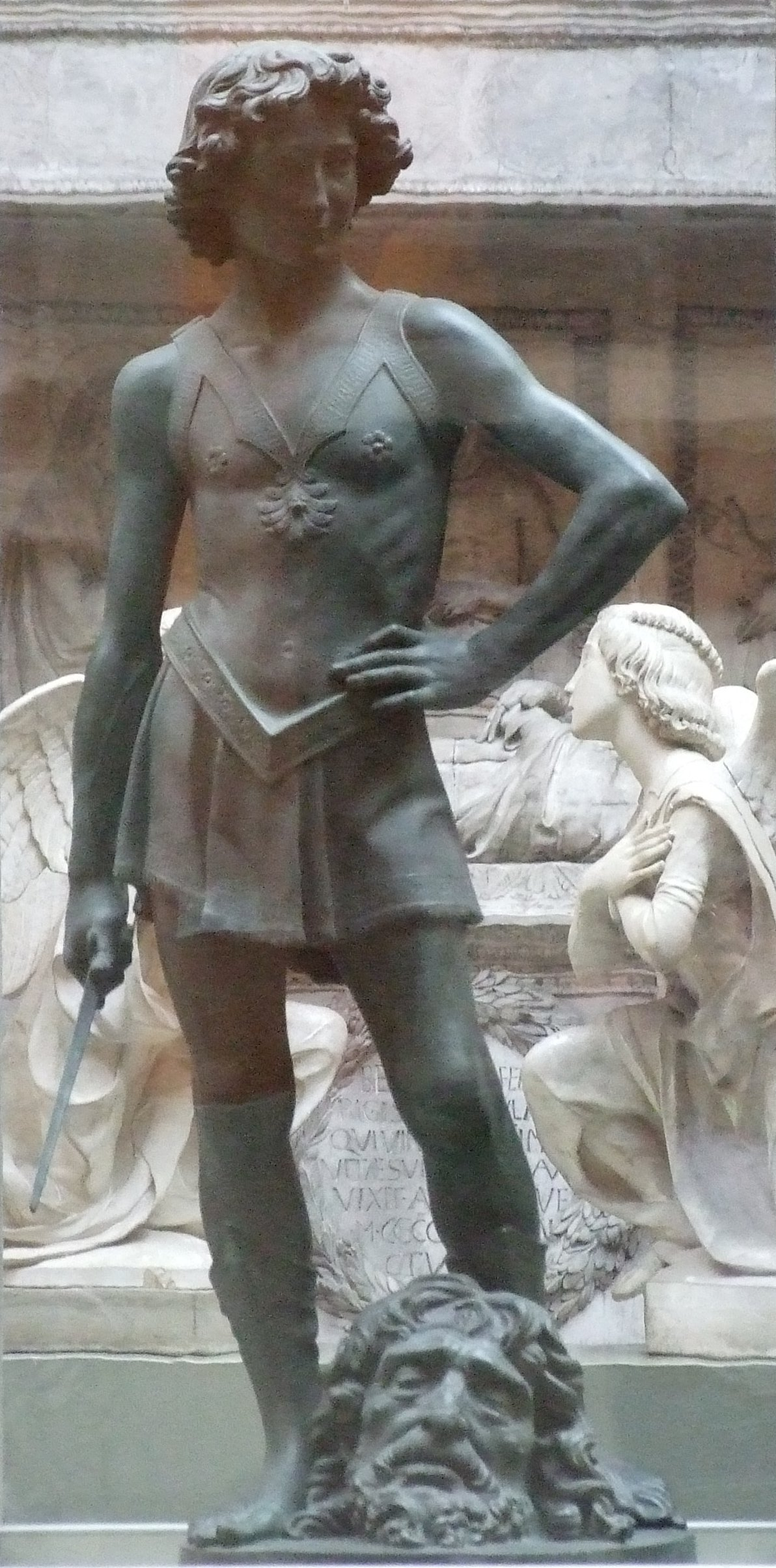
Andrea del Verrocchio, c. 1473–1475

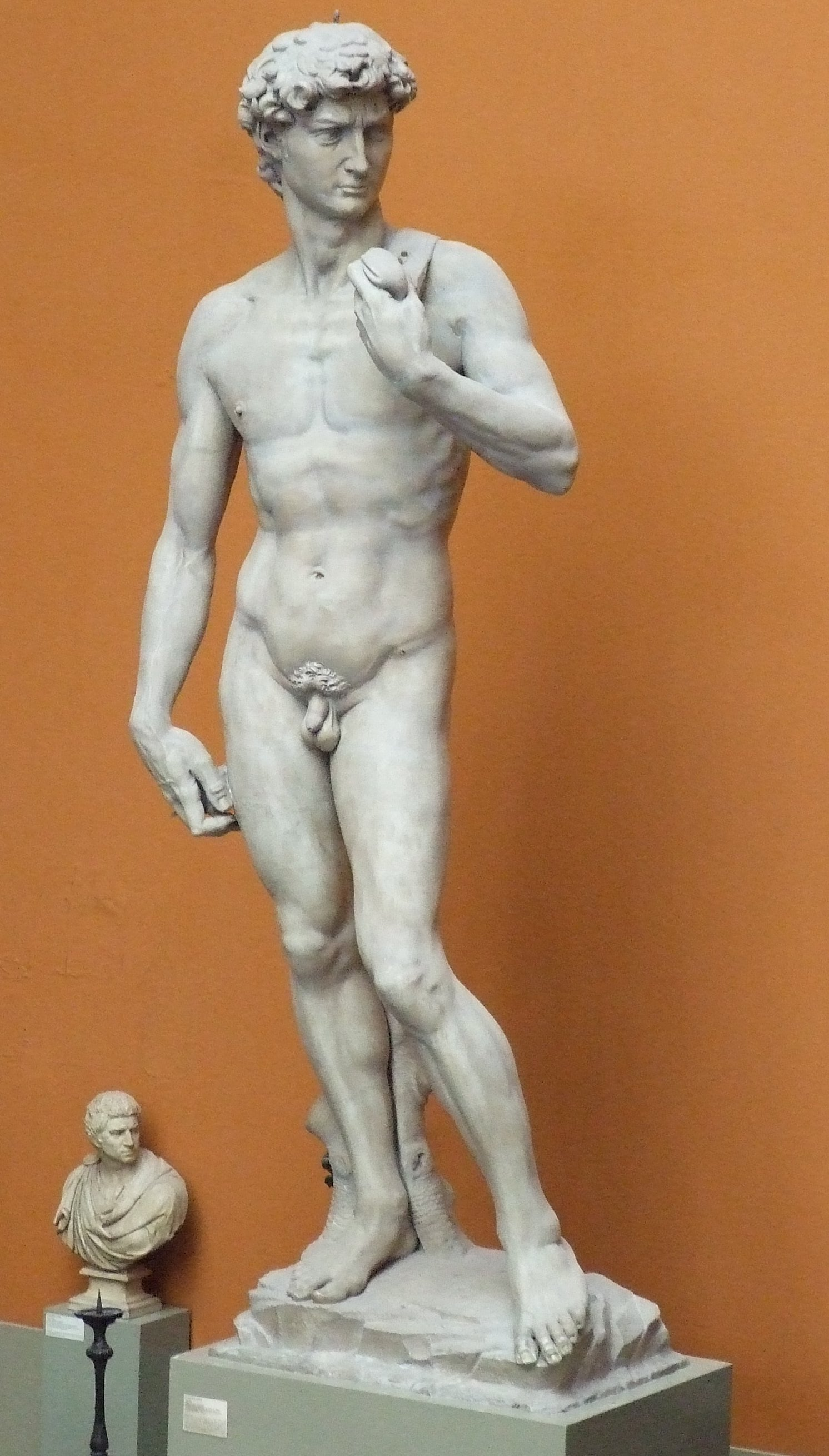
Michelangelo, 1501–1504

=== Other notable works ===
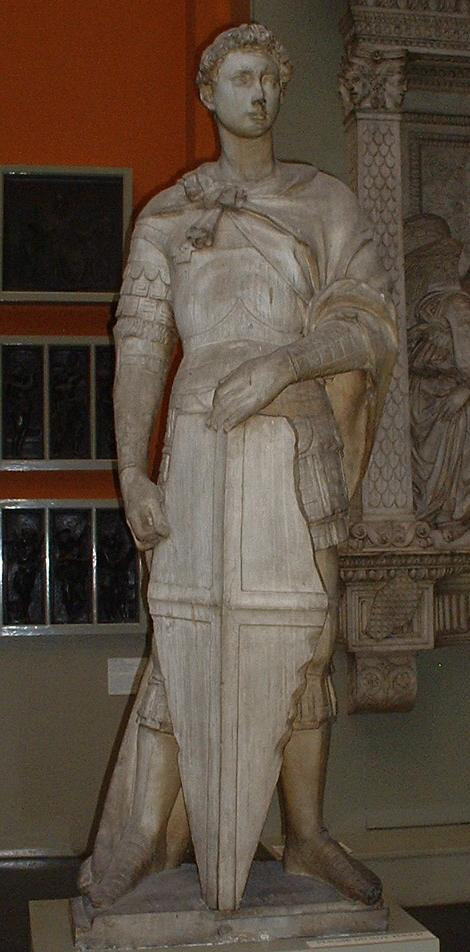
Saint George, after marble original by Donatello

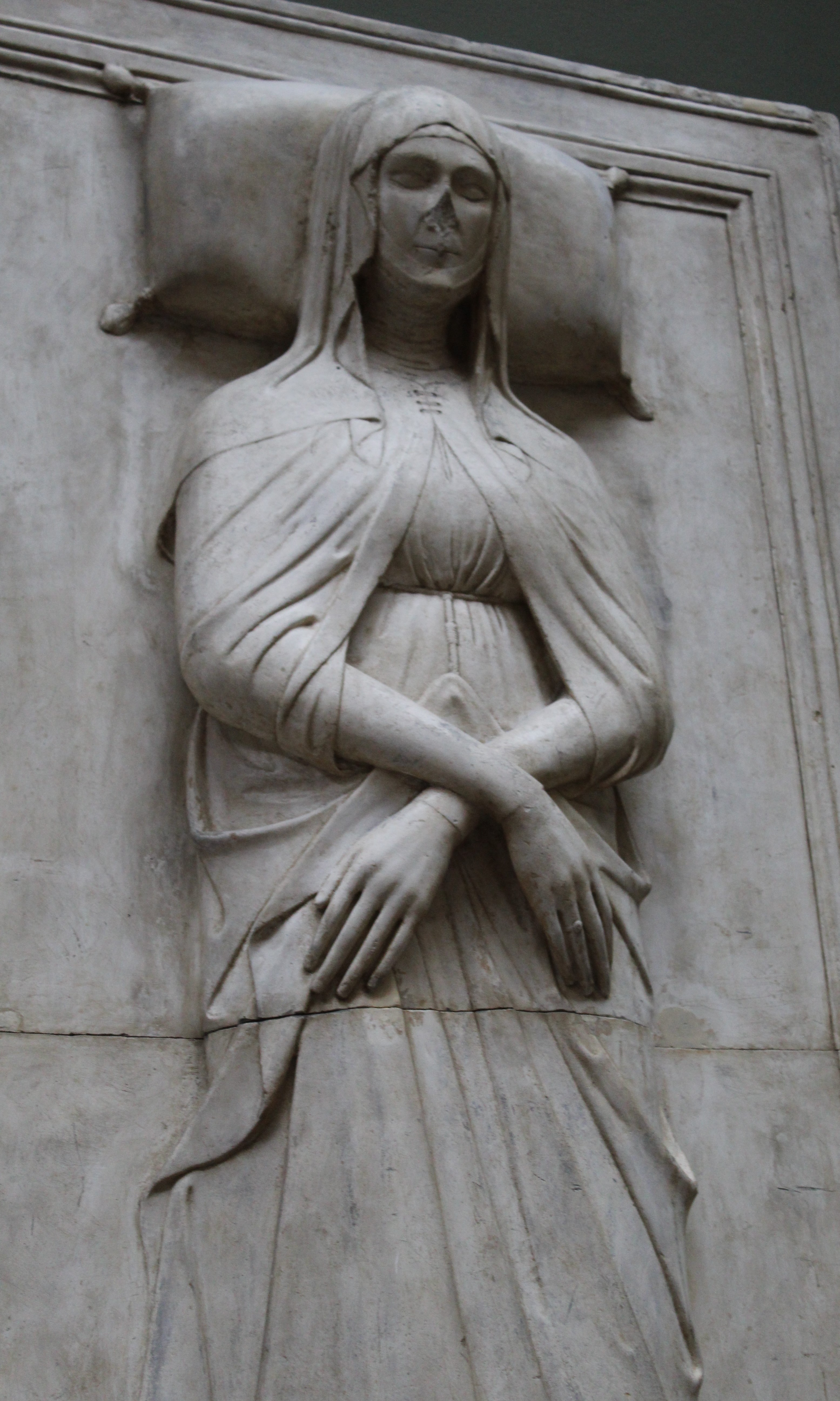
Effigy of a women, Pavia, Italy, c. 1380–1400; cast by Carlo Campi, c. 1894

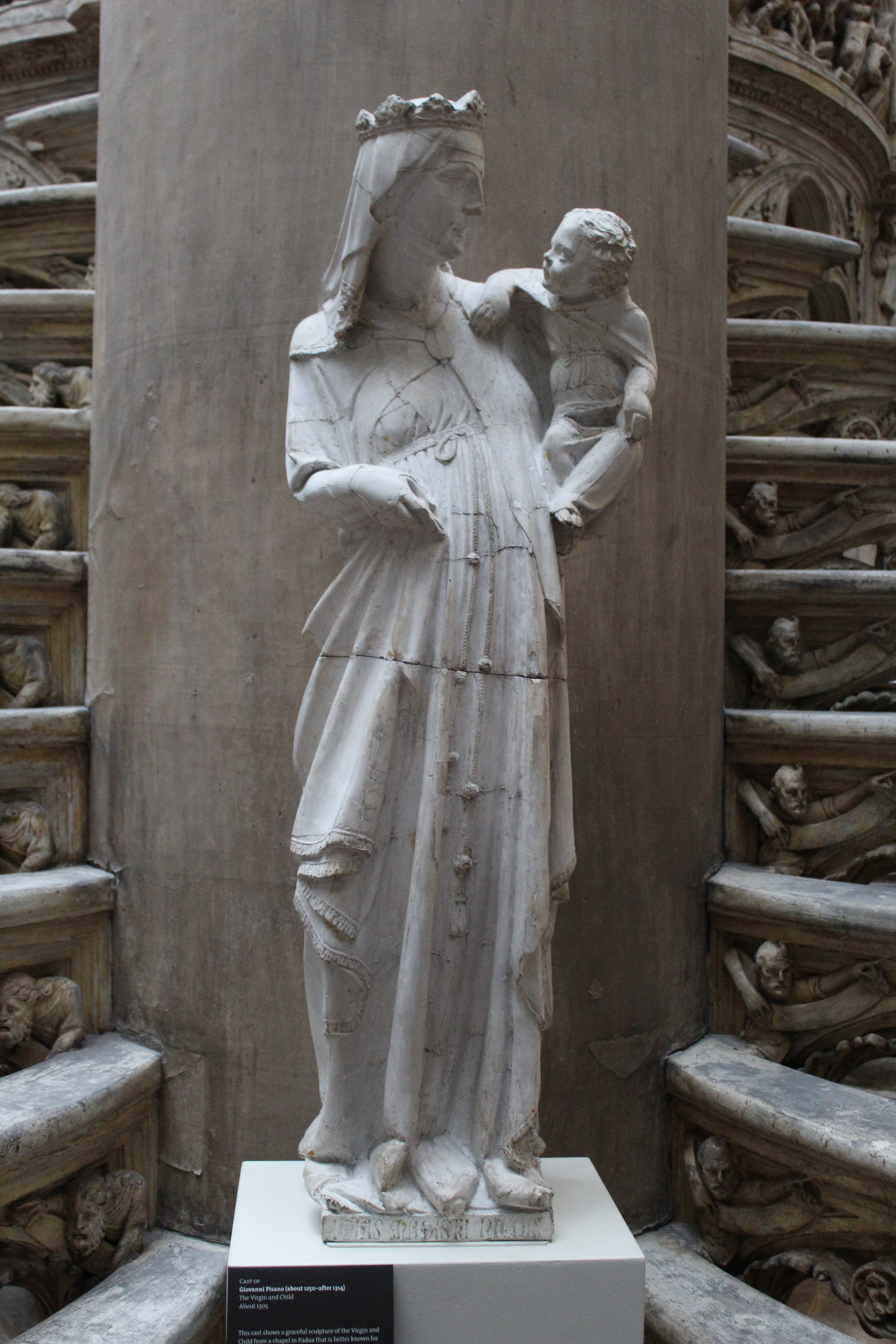
Virgin and Child, after original by Giovanni Pisano, cast probably made in Berlin c. 1888

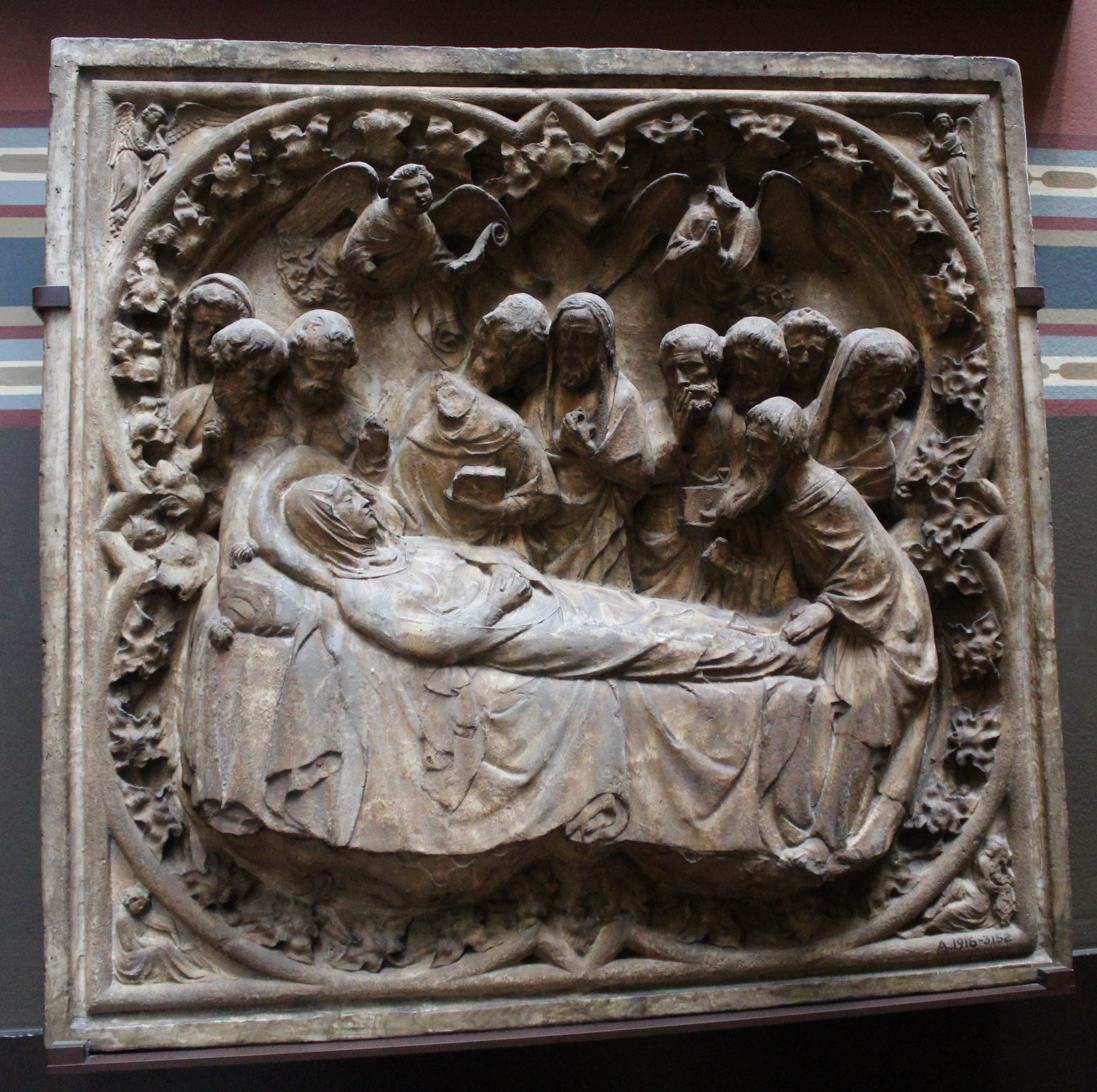
Death of the Virgin, after original in Notre-Dame Cathedral, Paris, c. 1220

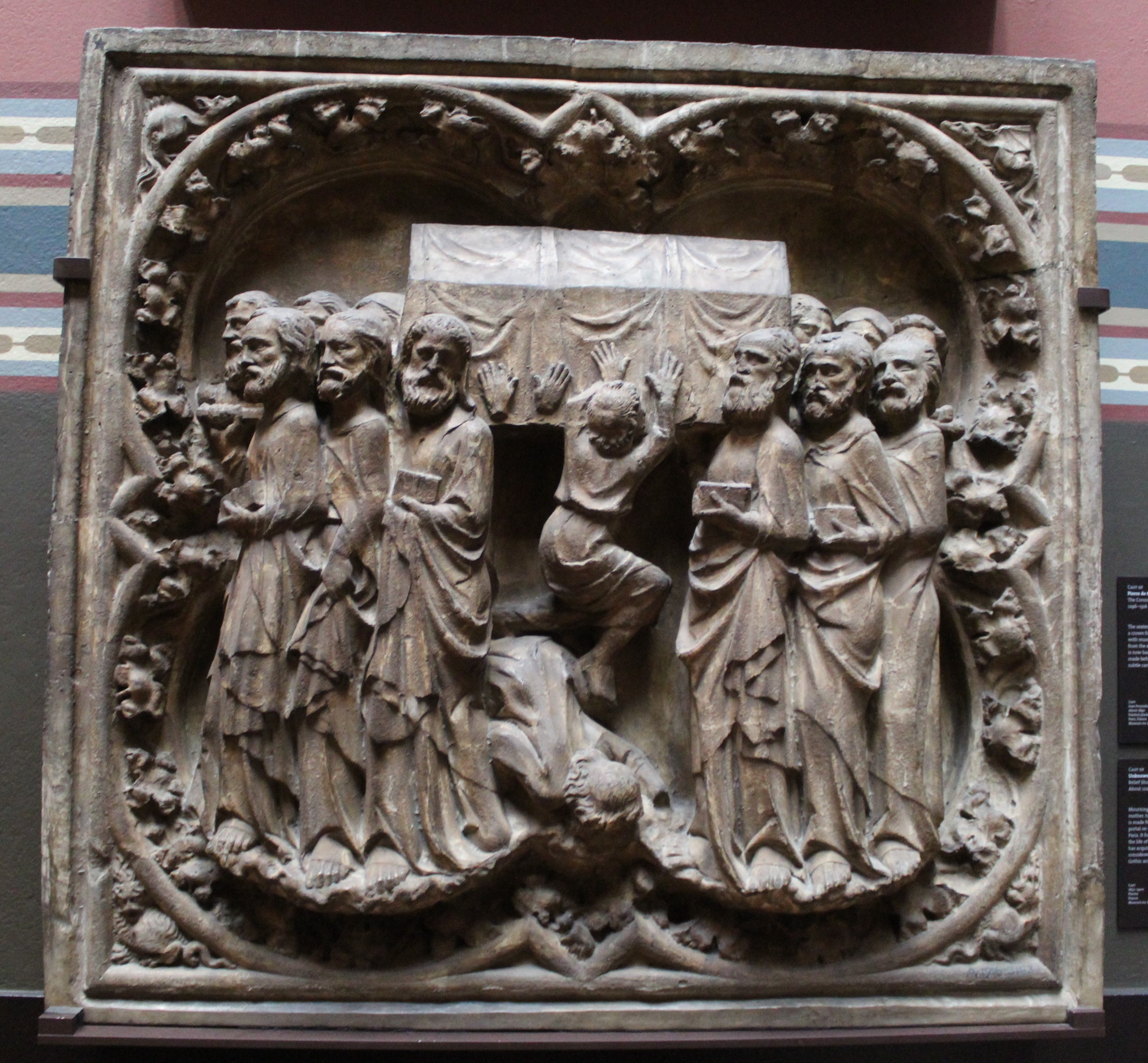
Entombment of the Virgin, after original in Notre-Dame Cathedral, Paris, c. 1220
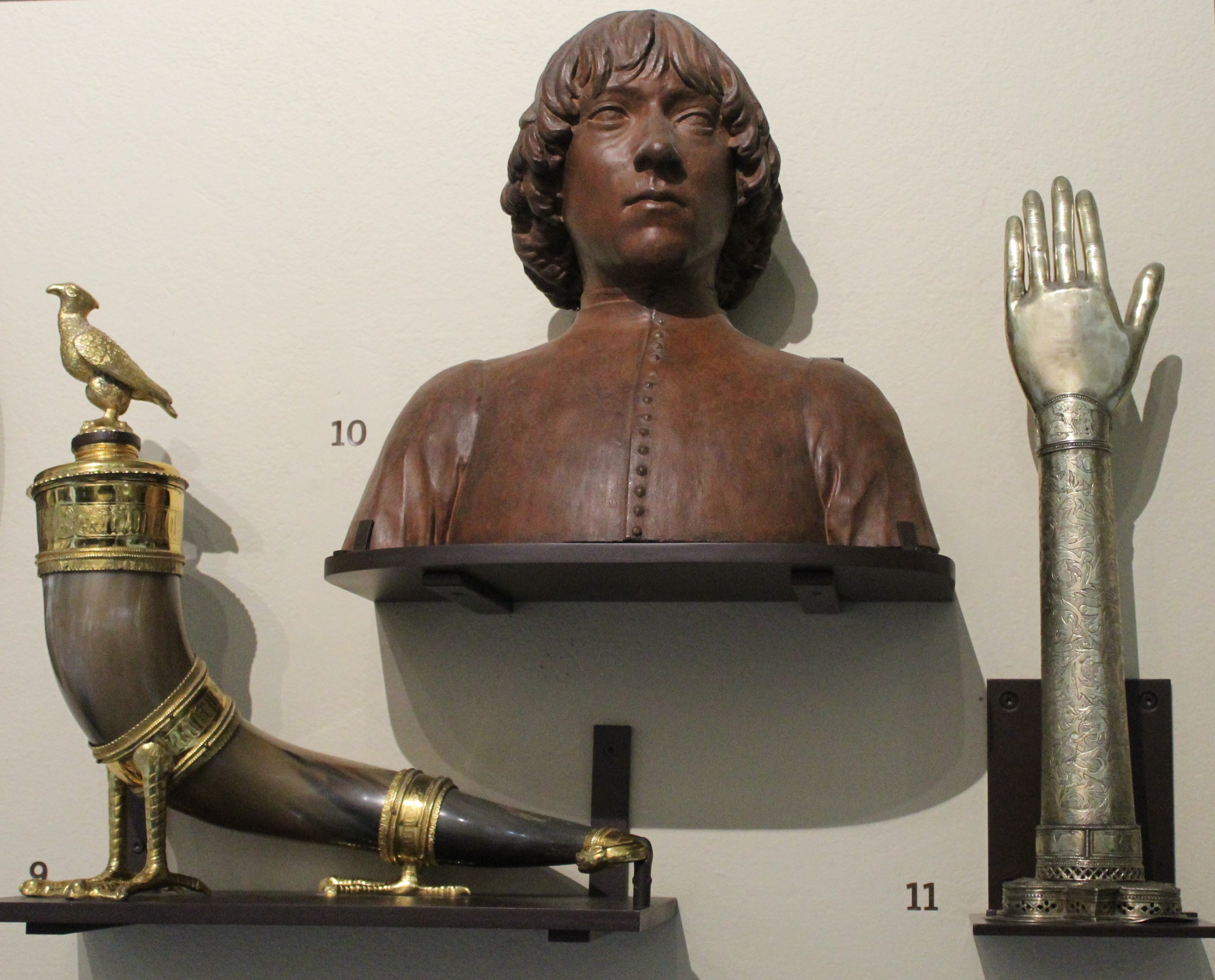
Display of plaster casts and other replicas (Room 46)

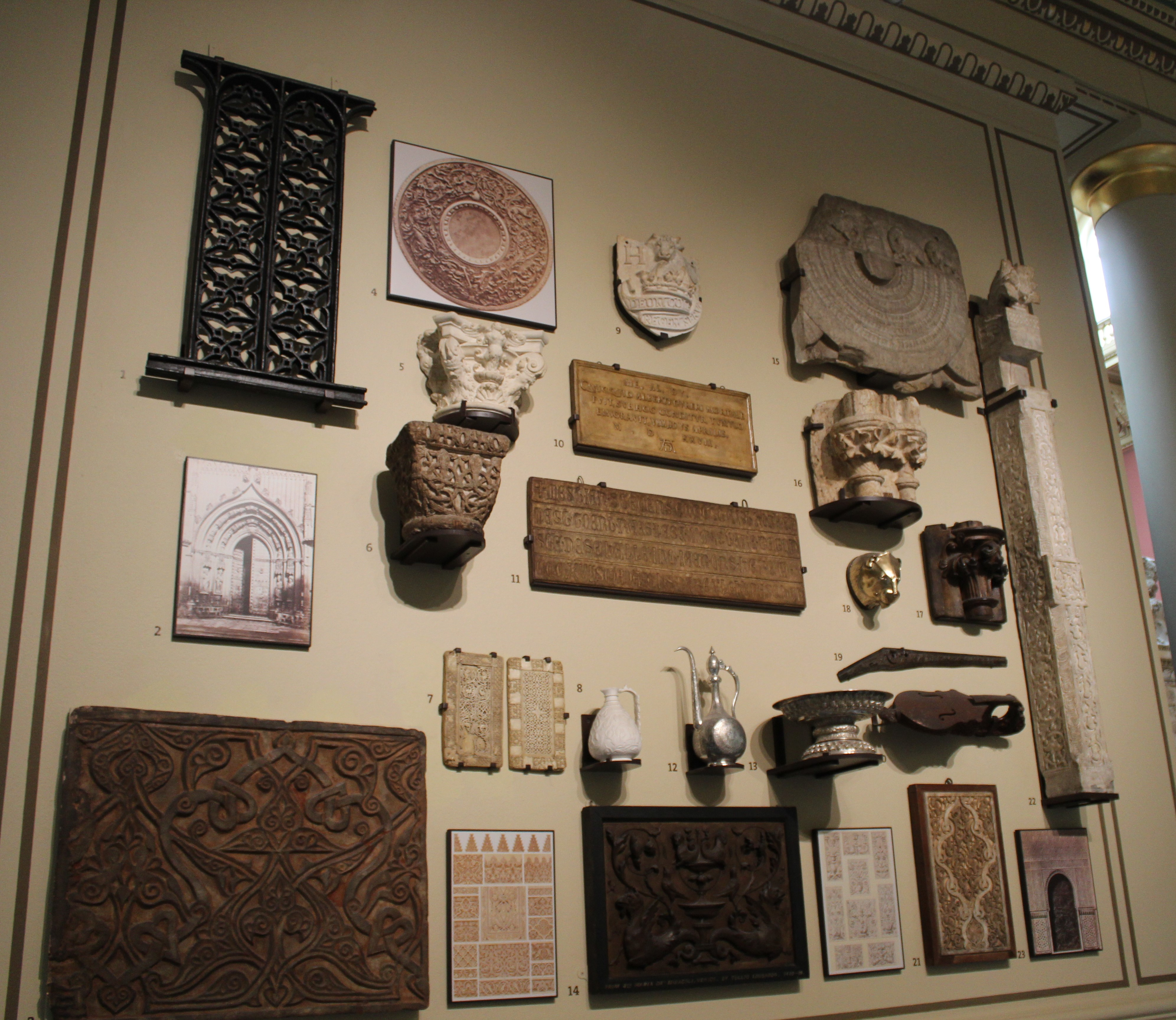
Casts and other replicas (Room 46)

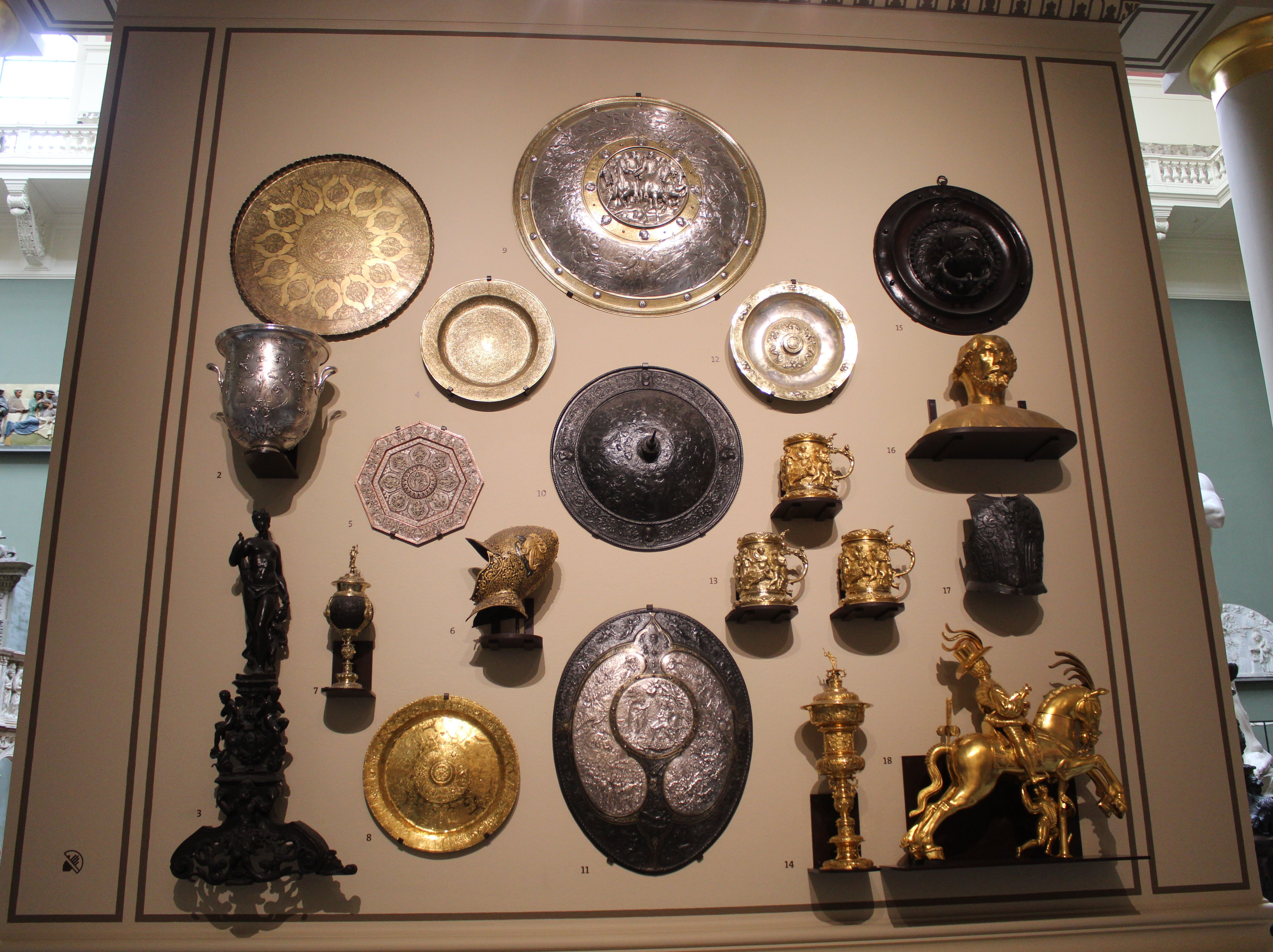
Casts and other replicas (Room 46), with the much larger Weston Court (Room 46b) visible behind

The Cast Courts have also been used for temporary exhibitions of works by contemporary artists and special events. These have included concerts and performances, London Design Festival commissions such as James Rigler's ceramics, as well as the display of Rachel Whiteread's 2003 work titled Room 101—a piece that artist was invited to cast shortly before the building which contained the original room 101 where George Orwell once worked was demolished.

As part of the museum's ongoing residency programme, Korean artist Yiyun Kang was invited in 2015 to spend six months working and studying in the museum. She used technologies such as digital projection mapping "bridging the gap between old and new technologies and recasting the courts as a spectacular animated space."

== See also ==
- Daylit Gallery – Exhibition space in the Victoria and Albert Museum
- Prince Consort Gallery – Exhibition venue in the Victoria and Albert Museum
- List of design museums
