= Daylit Gallery =

Exhibition space in the Victoria and Albert Museum

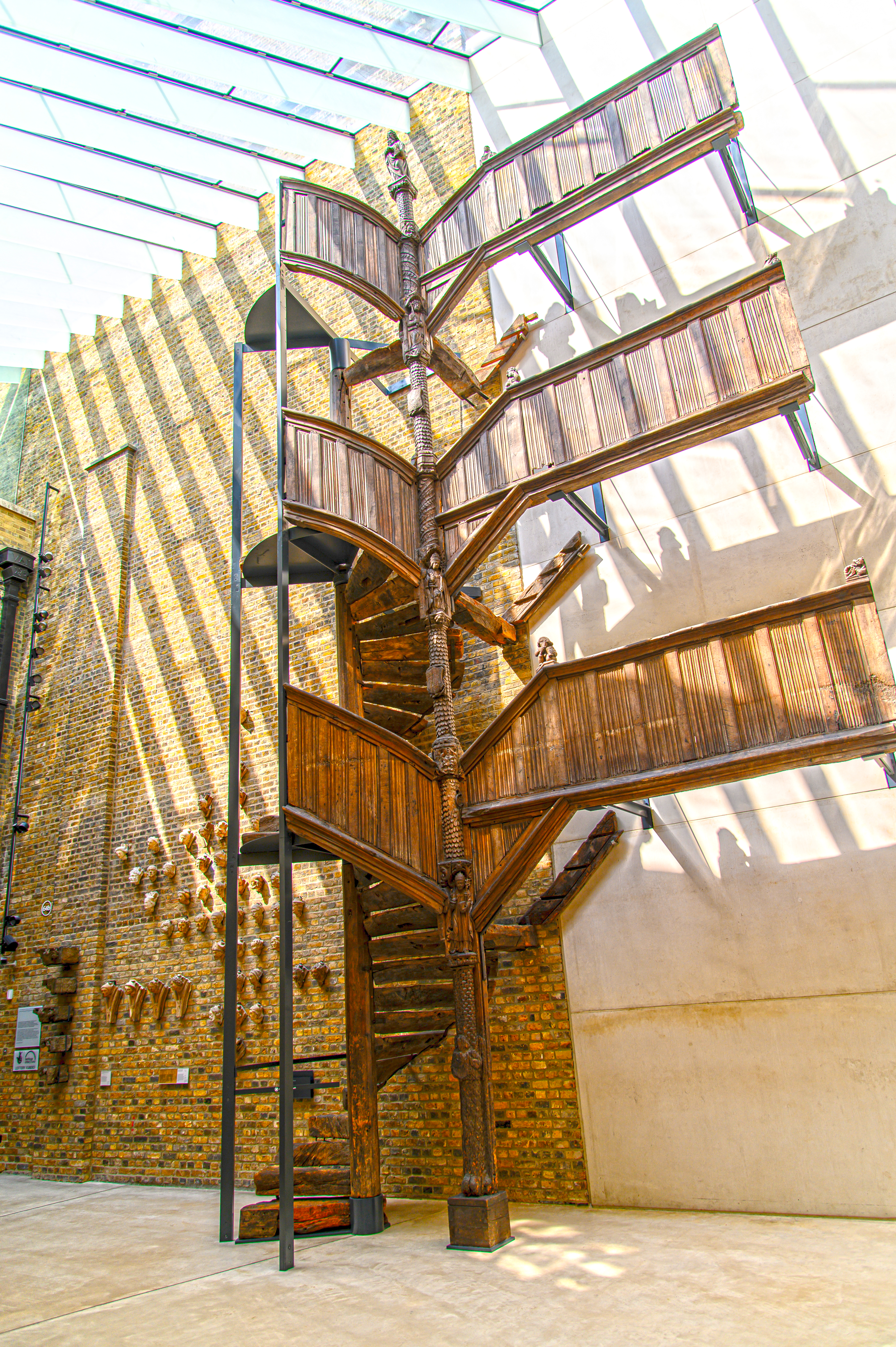
- Sunlight and shadows on a 16th-century wooden staircase from a townhouse in Brittany, France (Simon Sainsbury Gallery; Room 64b)
- Building: Victoria and Albert Museum
- Location: South Kensington, London
- Country: UK
- Coordinates: 51°29′48″N 00°10′15″W
- Area: c. 220 m²
- Named for: Simon Sainsbury
- Architects: McInnes Usher McKnight (MUMA); Julian Harrap

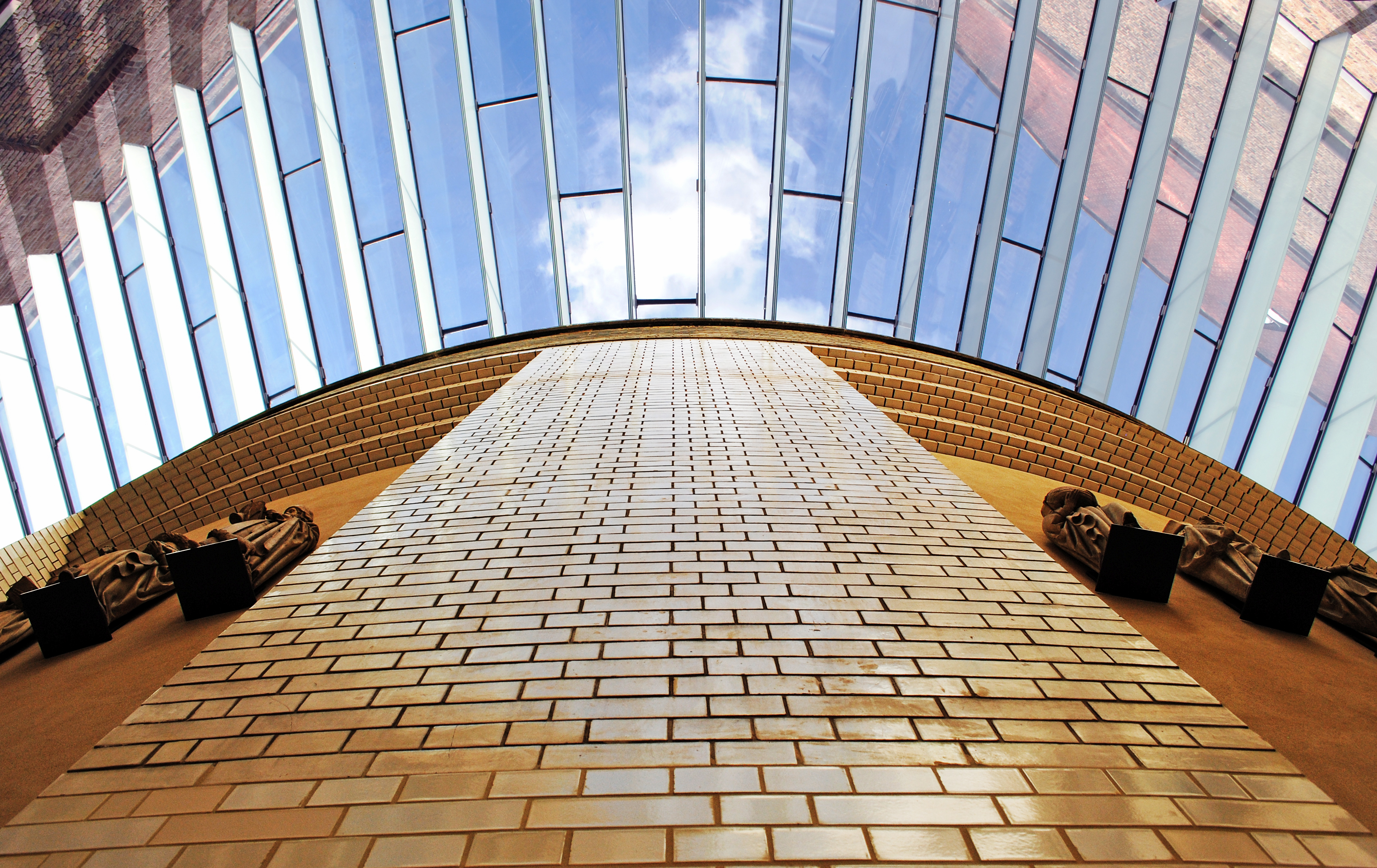
Sky view through the Daylit Gallery's clear glass roof panels and frosted glass structural "ribs"

The Daylit Gallery (The Simon Sainsbury Gallery; V&A Gallery 64B; Medieval and Renaissance, Room 64b) is an exhibition venue in London's Victoria and Albert Museum. It was created in 2009 by enclosing previously undeveloped and underutilised exterior spaces in between the buildings of the museum's main South Kensington site.

== Location and characteristics ==
The Daylit Gallery is adjacent to the Wolfson Gallery (Room 64) and the Robert H. Smith Gallery (Room 64a) on the V&A's 1st floor, just above the large, vaulted Medieval and Renaissance galleries on the ground floor (Rooms 50a, 50b, 50c, and 50d). These galleries are adjacent to the Secretariat Wing, a limited access area that occupies the museum's Southeast corner and houses its executive offices, administrative functions, and boardroom.

The four-story high atrium-like volume of the gallery was created by repurposing and enclosing a large, outdoor interstitial space, and covering it with an all glass roof. The structure "uses glass beams or 'fins' to support the glazing", the panels of which were cold bent in place to form a hyparsurface. At its inception, the gallery was the only space in the museum entirely covered with glass.

The removal of a two level Victorian marble staircase facilitated the design and addition of a new staircase and lifts—allowing for the development of a vertical "circulation hub" which joins six levels of the museum. Passing through the Daylit Gallery and connecting it with the larger suite of Medieval and Renaissance Galleries, this circulation hub provides continuity and adds previously lacking "equality of access" throughout this zone of the V&A.

=== Interior views of the Daylit Gallery ===
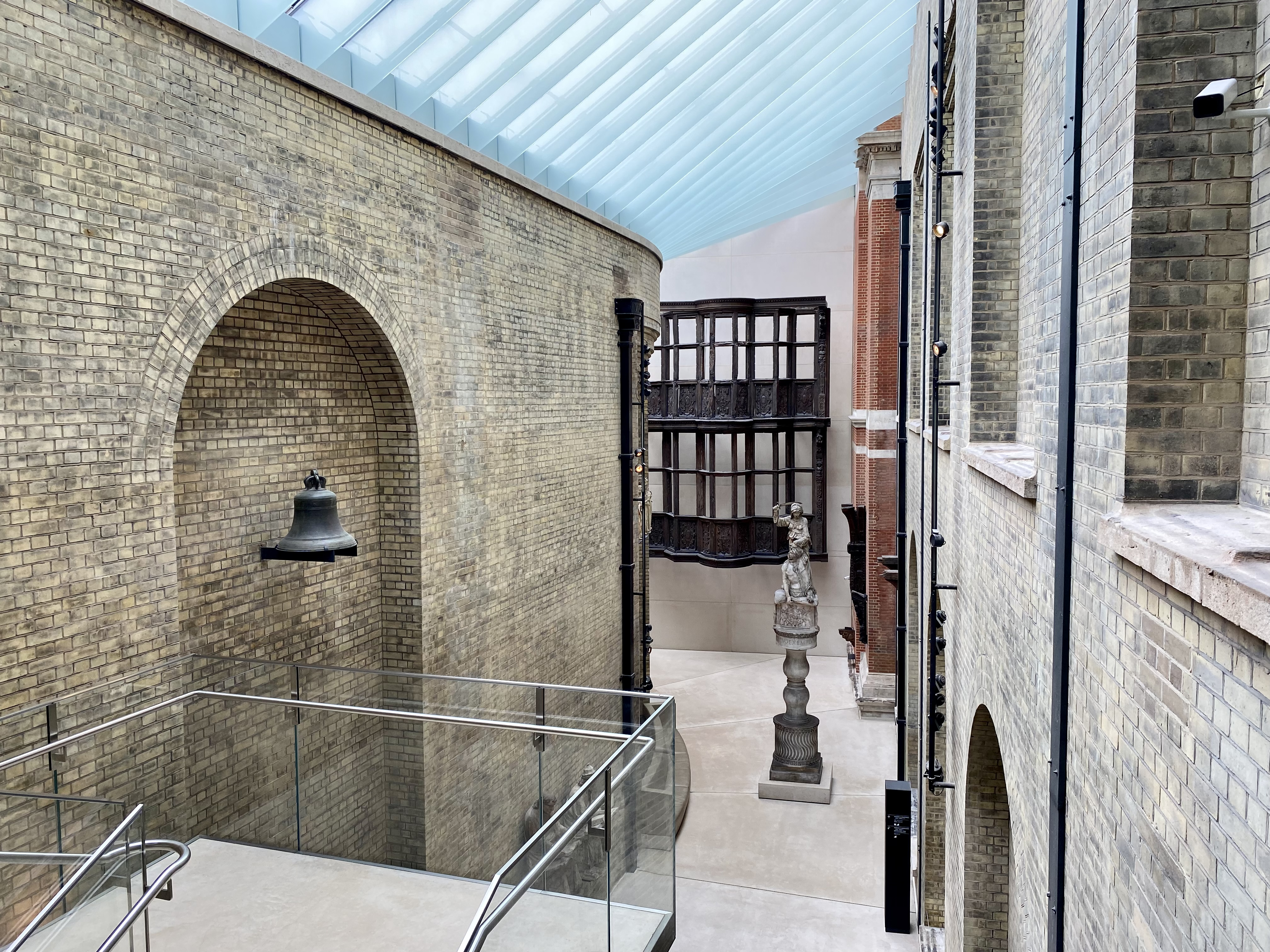
View showing the roof structure and a glass balustrade of the "circulation hub" staircase, a 13th-century bronze English church bell, a remnant of the wooden façade of Sir Paul Pindar's London house (c. 1599), and a plaster cast of a Donatello sculpture on an ornate pedestal.

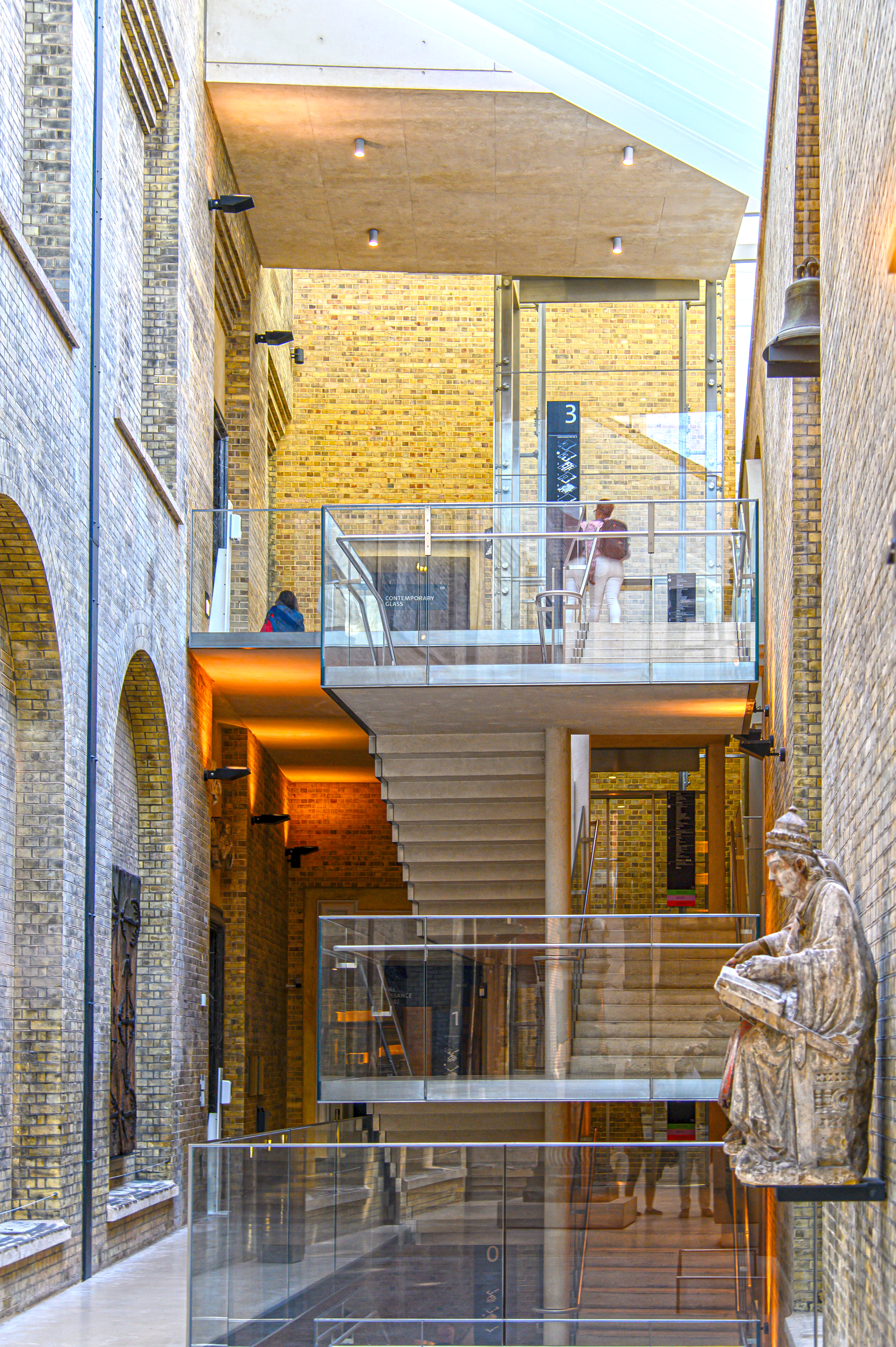
Opposing view showing the gallery's circulation hub staircase in front of the lightwell and lifts

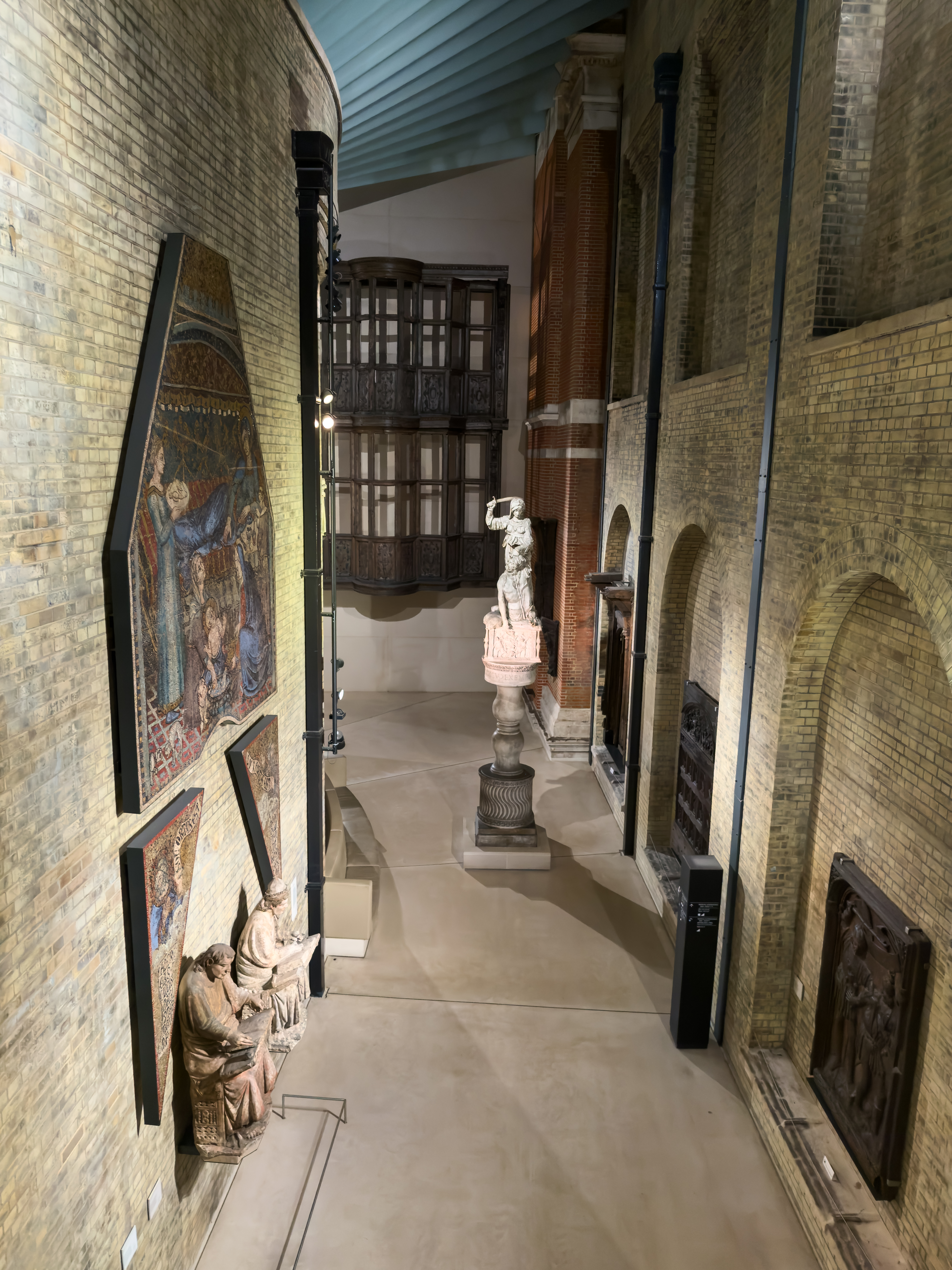
Seen at night from the circulation hub staircase

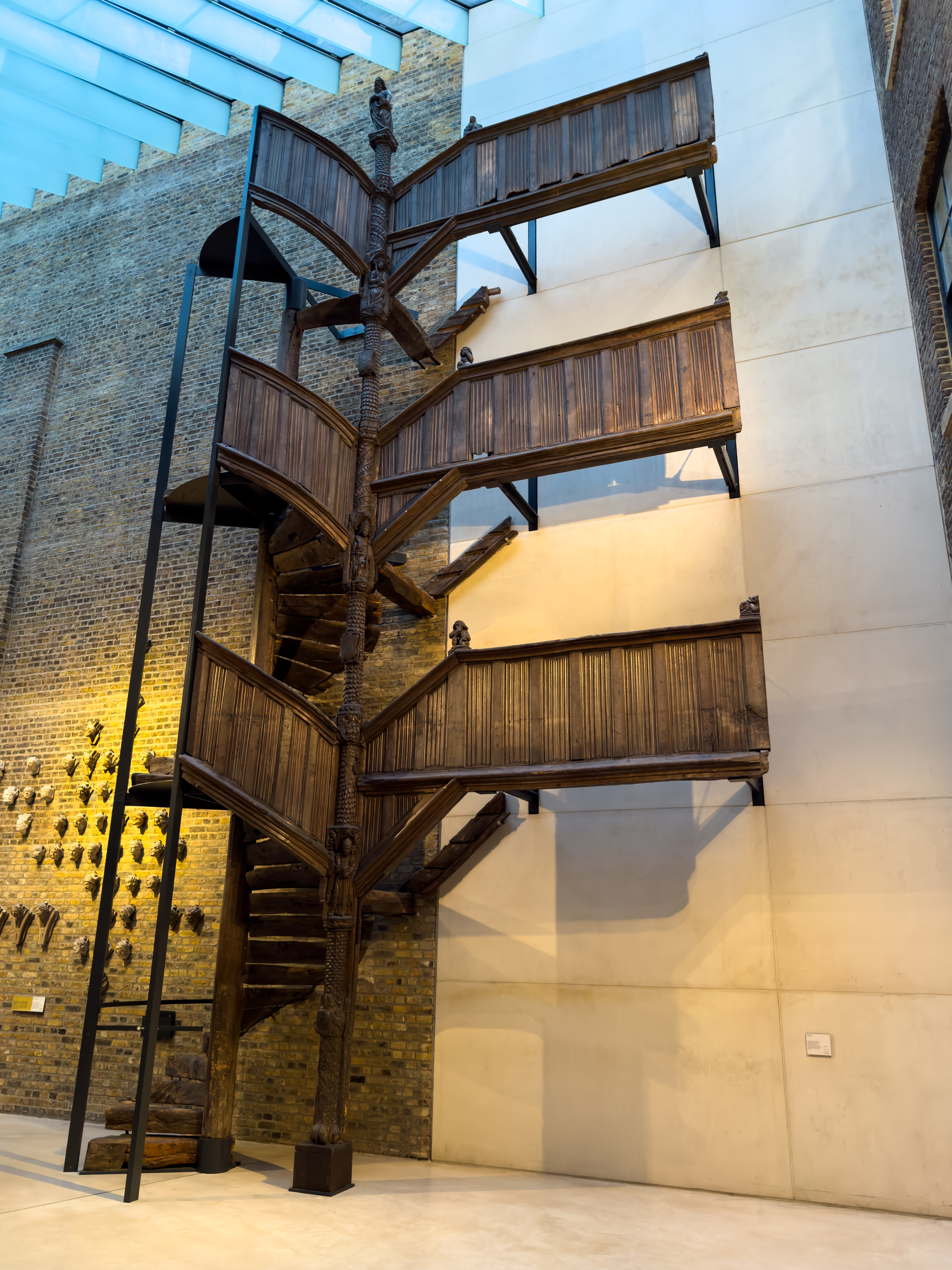
Another view showing the Morlaix staircase in artificial light

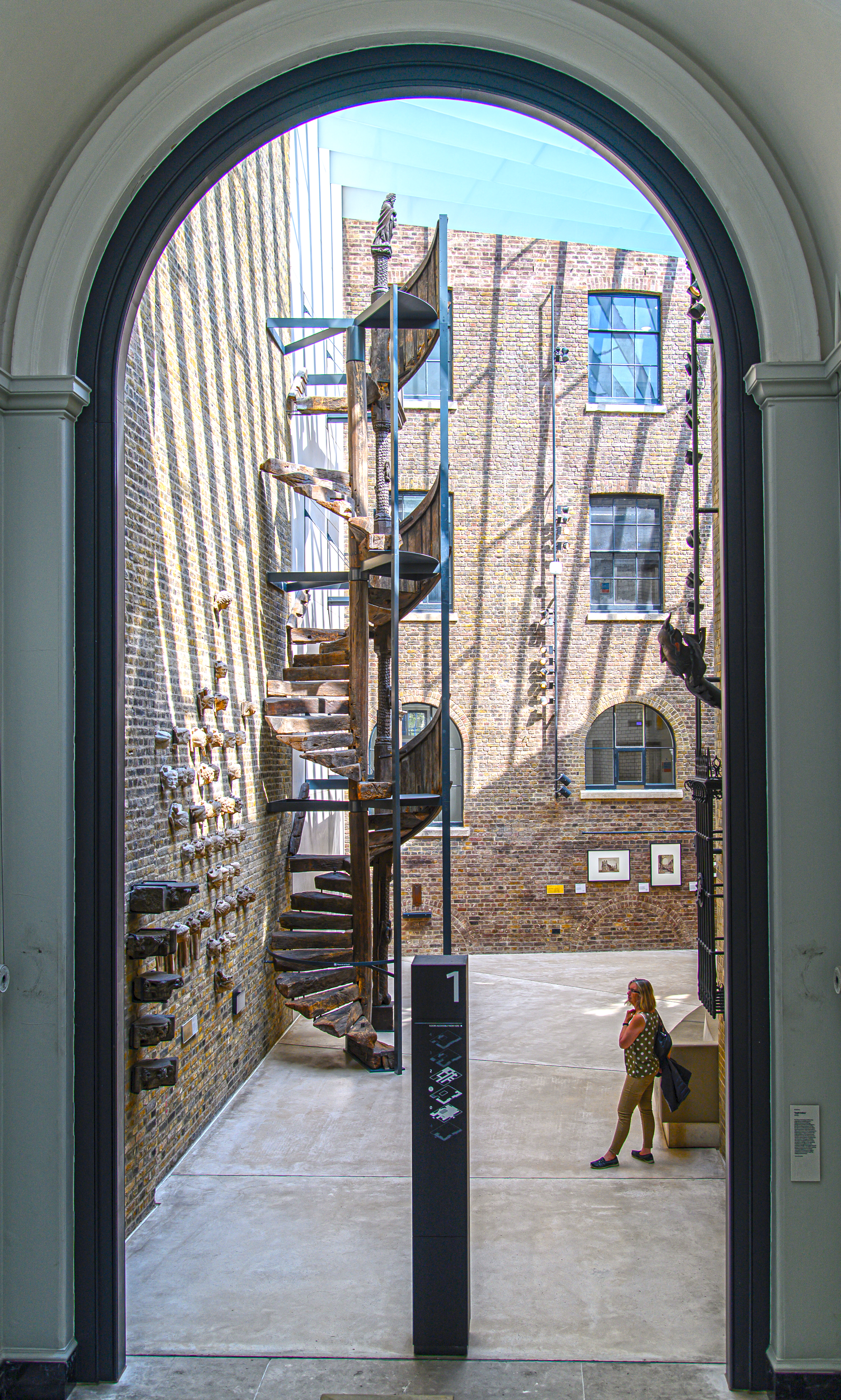
Morlaix staircase seen through the arched doorway of the gallery's secondary entrance

== History and function ==
Prior to its conversion into an exhibition venue, the area now occupied by the Daylit Gallery was a utility courtyard sandwiched between different parts of the museum. It was a liminal space not originally intended for use by museum visitors or the display of works from the V&A's collection.

As part of the museum's long-term "FuturePlan" redevelopment programme which began in 2001, the architects McInnes Usher McKnight (MUMA) and Julian Harrap were commissioned to update and redesign this part of the museum. The resulting project included the renovation of ten existing galleries to showcase the Medieval and Renaissance collections, as well as the design and creation of the new glass-covered Daylit Gallery (Room 64b).

Construction, which was completed in late 2009, was funded in part by the Sainsbury family, and the gallery itself is named after Simon Sainsbury. Room 64b was "the first new-build public space created at the museum in over 100 years."

The great height of the Daylit Gallery allows for the display of large-scale artefacts such as the partial jettied façade of a 15th-century timber-framed house that survived the Great Fire of London, and a wooden spiral staircase (known as the Morlaix staircase) from a 16th-century Breton townhouse. The gallery also contains many smaller architectural fragments, including a brick wall studded with 19th century plaster casts that were made from Salisbury Cathedral's decorative stonework (corbel heads, grotesques, mascarons, etc.), as well as other objects and curiosities in wood, bronze, wrought iron, and stone. The display of plaster casts (most of which are found in the Cast Courts) also includes a Donatello sculpture on an ornate pedestal.

The architects received a Design and Art Direction Gold Pencil award in 2010 for the "new suite of galleries to house the V&A's Medieval and Renaissance collections." The D&AD citation highlights the "Daylit Gallery and circulation hub" as criteria for the award. At the 2010 World Architecture Festival awards, the gallery was named "Structural Design of the Year" for its all glass roof.

=== Selection of works displayed in the Daylit Gallery ===
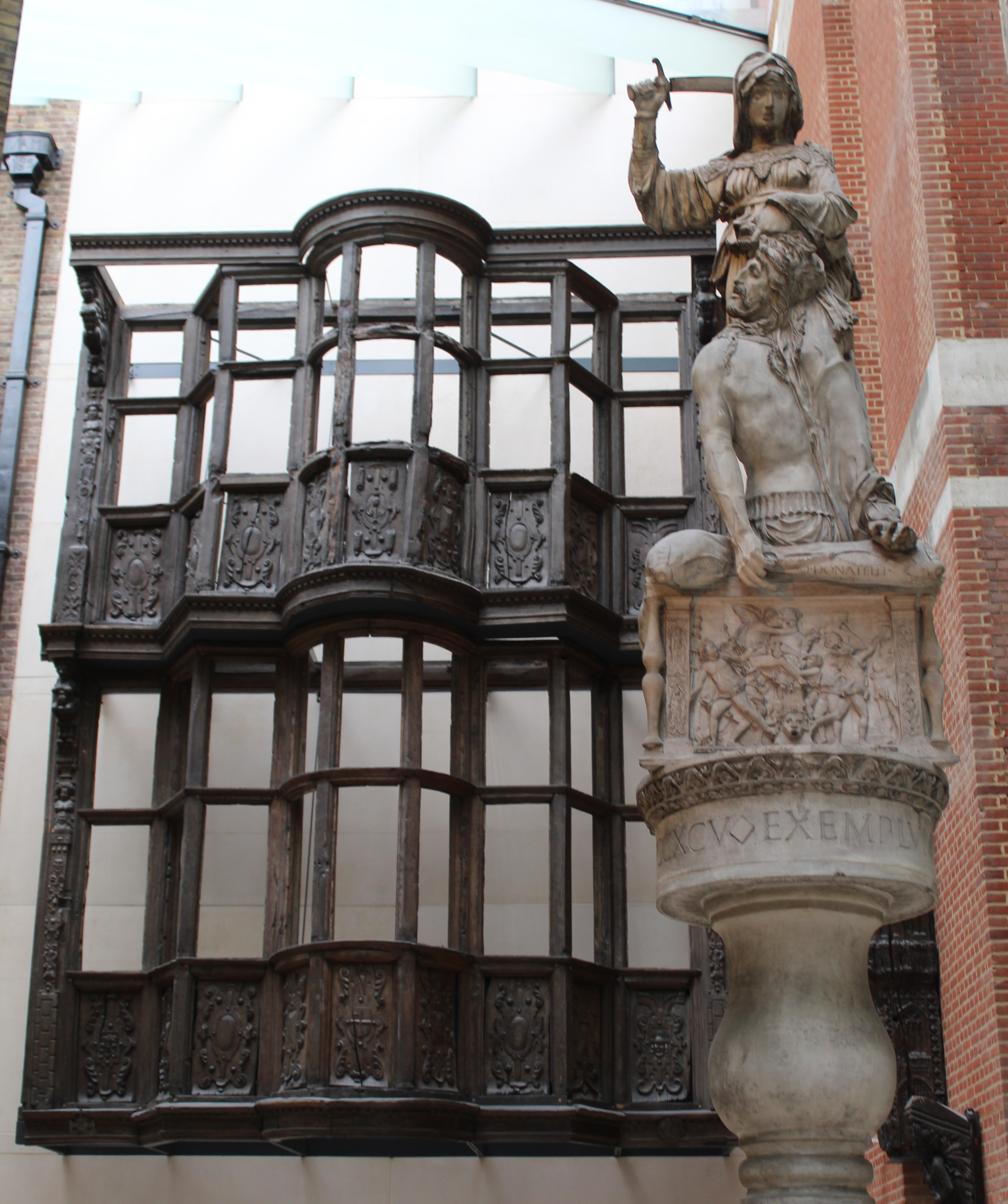
Façade of Paul Pindar's house and cast of Donatello's Judith and Holofernes

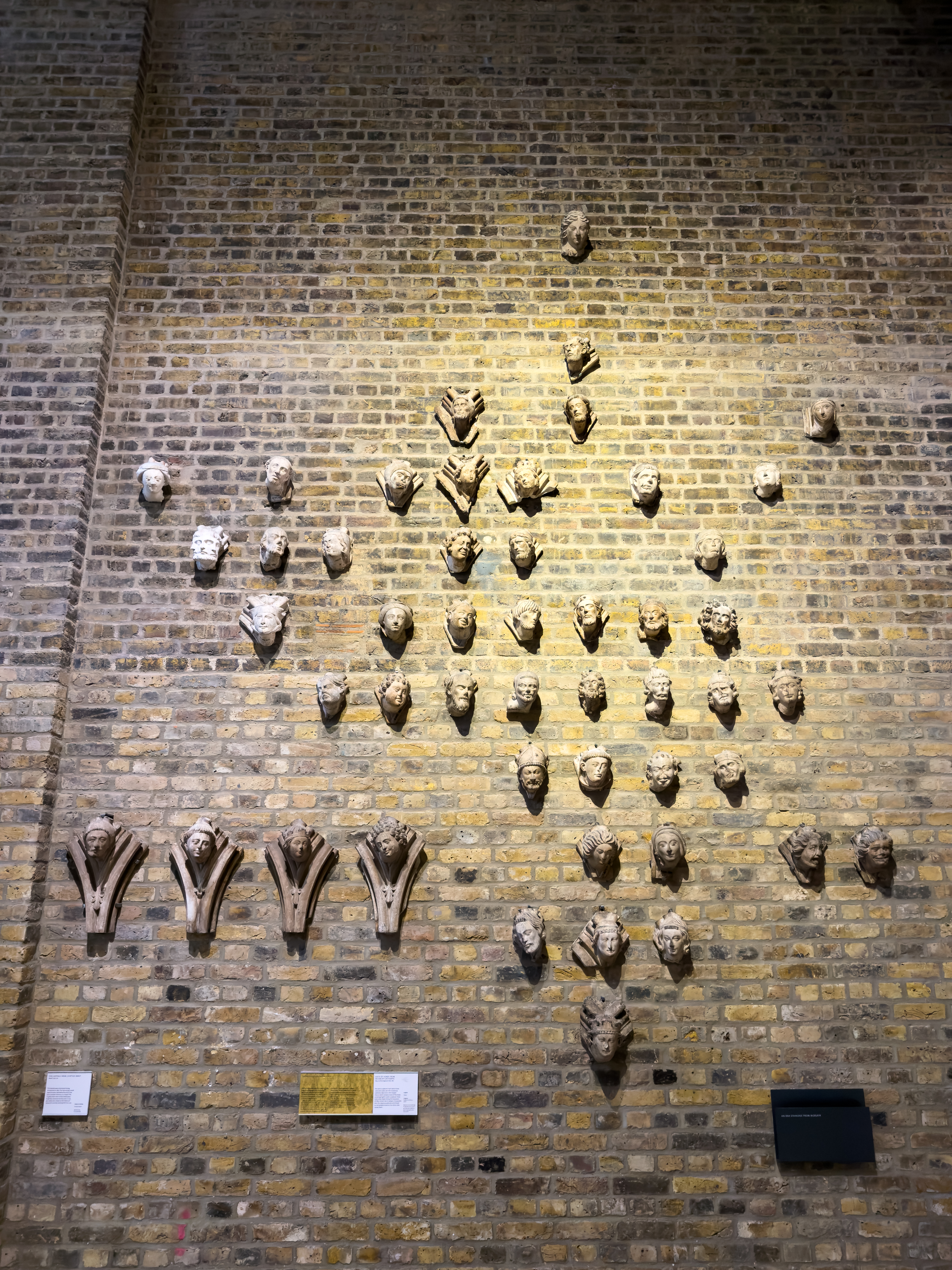
19th-century plaster casts of ornamental heads from Salisbury Cathedral (originals c. 1260–1280)

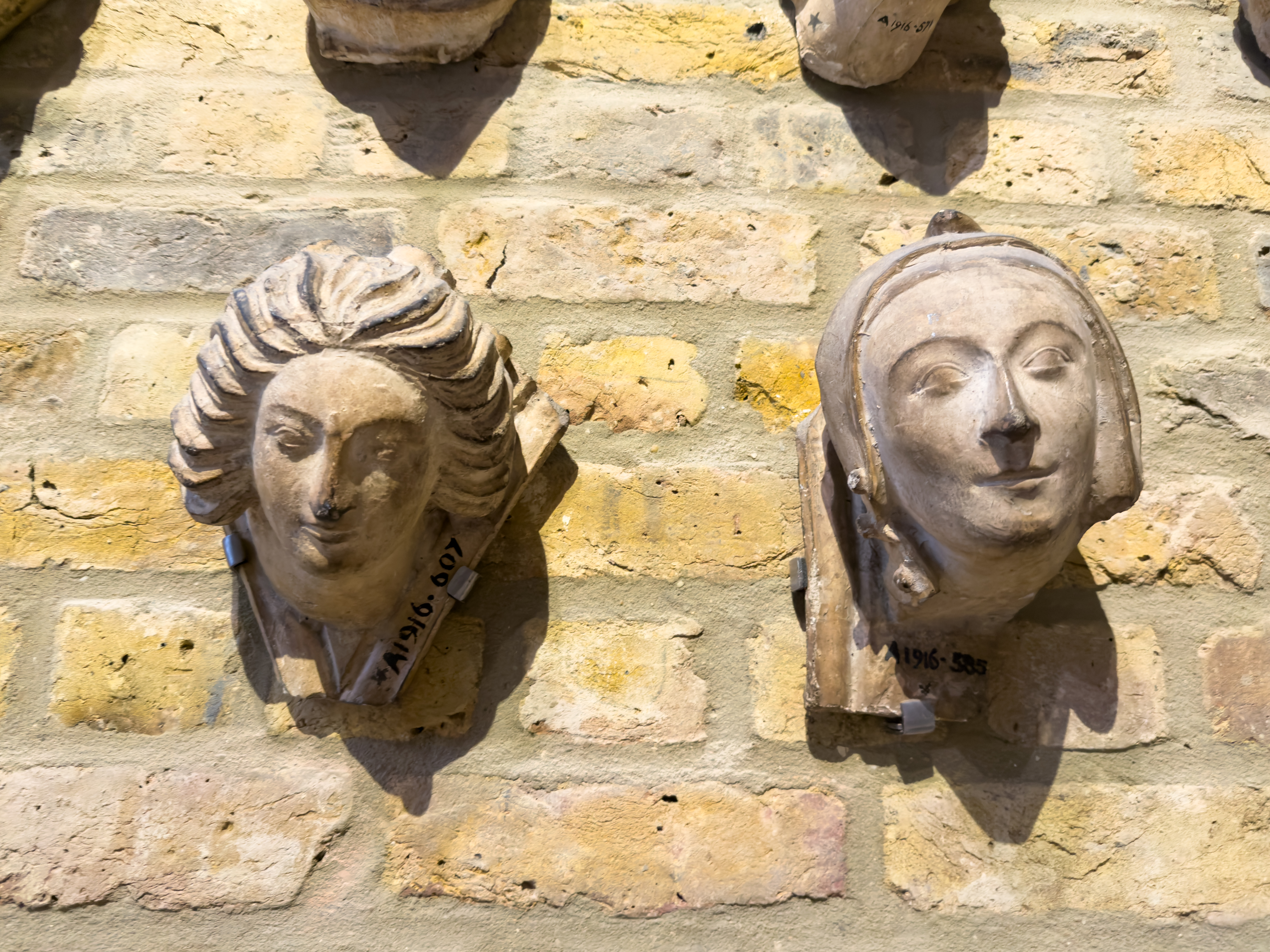
Casts of corbel heads from Salisbury Cathedral (detail)

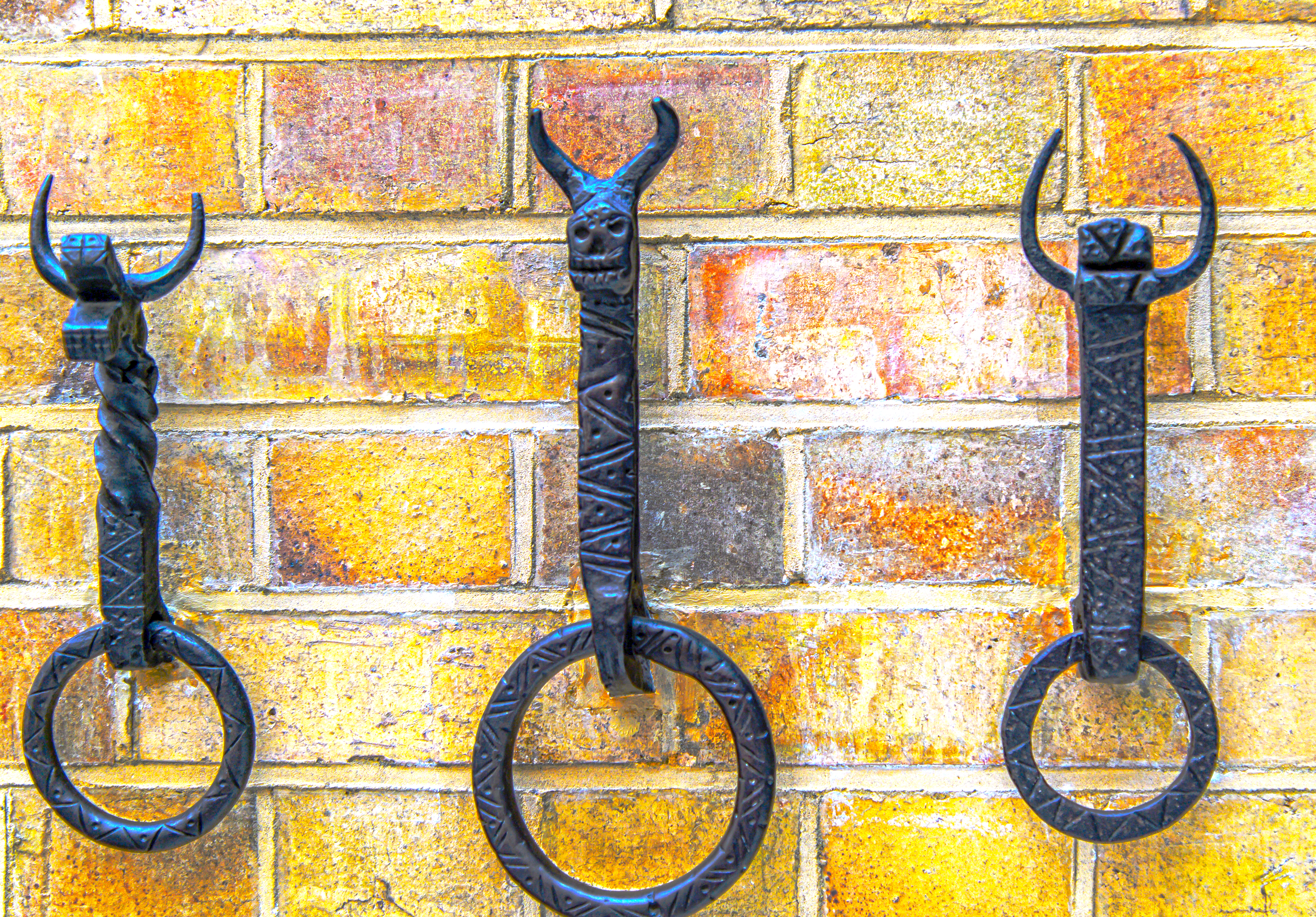
Wrought iron horse tethering rings, Siena, Italy (c. 1400–1500)

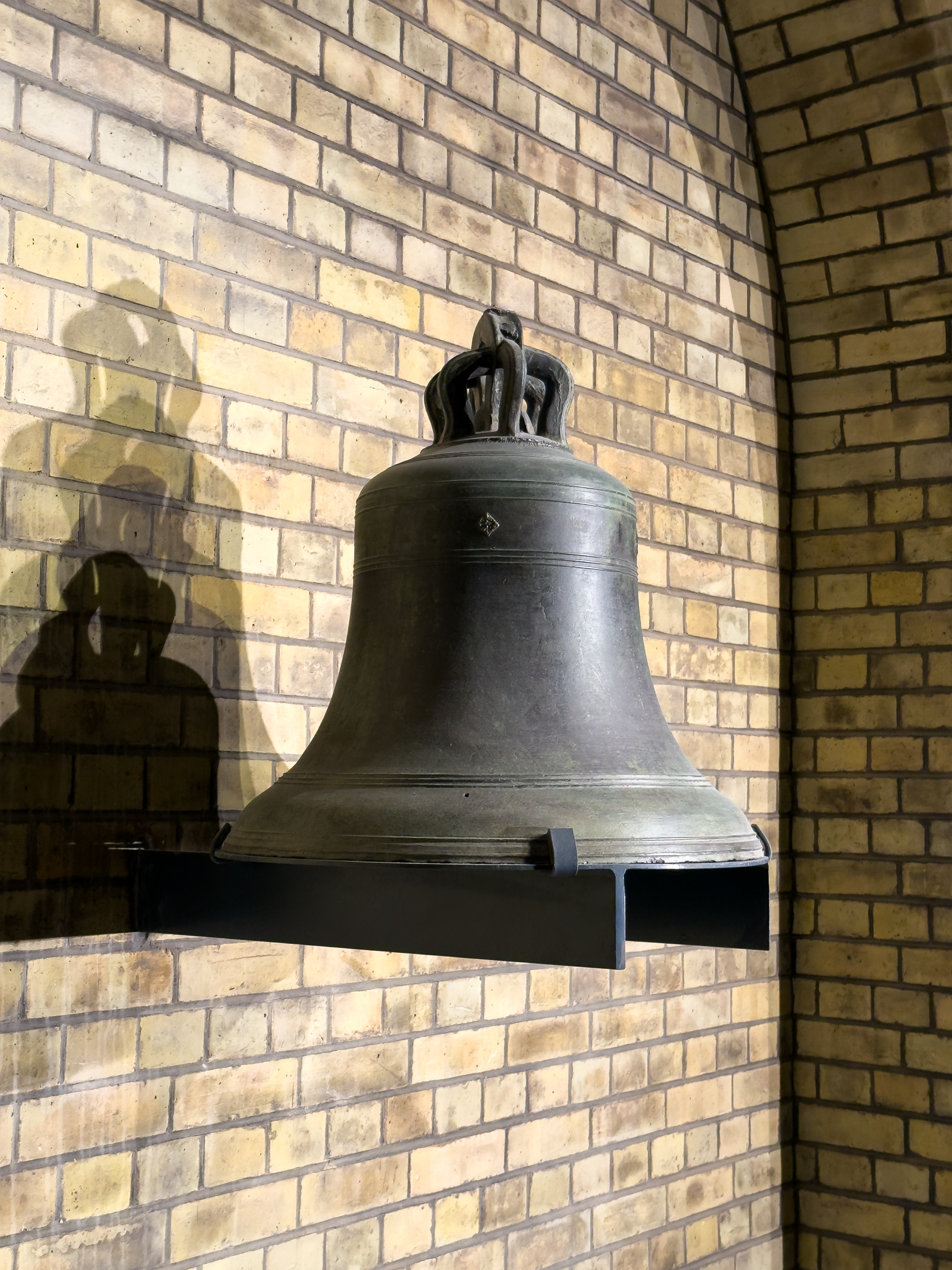
Bronze bell, Essex, England (c. 1395–1405)

== Exhibitions and events ==
The museum has used the Daylit Gallery to stage temporary exhibitions during the London Design Festival (LDF), screen films, and to host various public and private events. In 2010, as part of the exhibition 1:1 – Architects Build Small Spaces, a Japanese teahouse on stilts by Terunobu Fujimori called Beetle's House was constructed in situ in the gallery, and in 2013 an installation by the artist and designer Najla El Zein called Wind Portal that included 5,000 spinning paper windmills was commissioned by the LDF.

In more recent years, special exhibitions in the space have included Plasticity by Niccolo Casas and Parley for the Oceans (2022); a Mino washi paper Hana Mikoshi "flower shrine" by Hayatsu Architects (2023); Communion (2024), an exploration of Ghana's culinary traditions, culture and rituals by artist-architect Giles Tettey Nartey; the Craft x Tech Tokai Project a "dialogue between traditional [Japanese] techniques and contemporary practices" (2026), and The Angry Summer (2026), a puppetry display by performers from the Royal Welsh College of Music & Drama based on Idris Davies' epic poem about the miners' strike of 1926.

== See also ==
- Cast Courts – Galleries in the Victoria and Albert Museum
- Prince Consort Gallery – Exhibition venue in the Victoria and Albert Museum
- List of design museums
