= Yiyun Kang =

South Korean visual artist and academic

- Born: Kang Yiyun
- Citizenship: South Korean
- Education: Seoul National University (BFA); UCLA (MFA); Royal College of Art (PhD)
- Known for: Digital media art, projection mapping, immersive installations
- Movement: Contemporary digital art, new media art
- Awards: Red Dot Award (2018); British Council Study UK Alumni Award for Culture and Creativity (2022); iF Award (2024); KAIST 10 Best Research Award (2024); Red Dot Award (2025)

Korean name
- Hangul: 강이연
- RR: Gang Iyeon
- MR: Kang Iyŏn
- Website: yiyunkang.com

Yiyun Kang (Korean: 강이연) is a South Korean contemporary artist, researcher, and educator working in digital media, projection mapping, and immersive multimedia installation. She is an associate professor and a Chair Professor in the Department of Industrial Design at KAIST.

Kang's work has been exhibited at institutions such as the Victoria and Albert Museum (V&A), the Venice Architecture Biennale, and the Grand Palais Immersif in Paris. She has produced commissioned projects with NASA and Google Arts & Culture, the BTS-funded public art programme Connect, BTS, and companies such as Max Mara and Jaeger-LeCoultre. Kang is a Fellow of the Royal Society of Arts (FRSA).

== Early life and education ==
Kang graduated summa cum laude with a Bachelor of Fine Arts in painting from Seoul National University. She later moved to the United States, where she completed a Master of Fine Arts in the Department of Design Media Arts at the University of California, Los Angeles (UCLA). Her MFA was supervised by Jennifer Steinkamp, who specialized in digital projection art. She subsequently earned a doctorate in information experience design at the Royal College of Art (RCA) in London, where she served as an Associate Lecturer for five years following her doctoral studies.

== Career ==
Kang is an associate professor in the Department of Industrial Design at KAIST (Korea Advanced Institute of Science and Technology). She directs the Experience Design Lab (XD Lab) at KAIST and also holds adjunct appointments in KAIST's Department of AI Future Strategy and Institute for Climate Change and Energy. She has also taught as a visiting lecturer at the Royal College of Art. She has served as a reviewer for conferences and journals in art and technology, including NeurIPS and Leonardo. Kang has also been a civilian member of the Public Diplomacy Committee under South Korea's Ministry of Foreign Affairs.

=== 2010s ===
Kang held residencies at Changdong National Art Studio (MMCA) in 2011 and Nanji Art Studio (SeMA) in 2012. From October 2015 to March 2016, she held a six-month residency at the Victoria and Albert Museum (V&A) in London as the V&A Samsung Korean Digital Art Resident. She was the first Korean artist to hold a residency at the V&A. During her residency, she produced the work Casting, which made use of projection mapping. The V&A acquired the work in 2017 as the museum's first kind of projection-mapping artwork.

In 2017, the Italian fashion house Max Mara commissioned Kang to create Deep Surface for its "Coats! Seoul" exhibition at the Dongdaemun Design Plaza. The installation projected moving digital imagery onto the interior of a purpose-built 20-metre dome, and received a Red Dot Award for Communication Design in 2018.

=== 2020s ===
Kang was among the 22 artists commissioned for Connect, BTS, a public art programme funded by the K-pop group BTS and staged across London, Berlin, Buenos Aires, Seoul, and New York City under the direction of curator Lee Daehyung. For the Seoul chapter, held at the Dongdaemun Design Plaza from January 28 to March 20, 2020, she presented a large-scale projection mapping work that reinterpreted BTS's choreography, alongside artists such as Tomás Saraceno, Antony Gormley, and Hans Ulrich Obrist. She was the sole Korean artist to participate in Connect, BTS.

Other notable commissioned projects include Geofuture (2022), commissioned by Dassault Systèmes, as well as Vanishing, 0.4, and the BMW Excellence Lounge project. In 2022, Kang also gave official oral evidence to the UK Parliament's Digital, Culture, Media and Sport Committee for its inquiry, "Connected tech: smart or sinister?"

For A Passage of Water, Kang worked with Google Arts & Culture and NASA on an interactive project about the depletion of the Earth's freshwater. The work draws on measurements from the GRACE and GRACE-FO satellite missions and the Surface Water and Ocean Topography (SWOT) mission, and was released online on November 30, 2023, ahead of the COP28 climate conference. NASA exclusively provided Kang with early access to SWOT satellite data for the project. Google presented a physical version as an immersive-interactive installation in the COP 28 (Conference of the Parties) Blue Zone in Duba.

Also in 2023, Kang was commissioned by the Swiss watchmaker Jaeger-LeCoultre under its Made of Makers programme to produce Origin, a multimedia sculptural installation projected onto a large three-dimensional screen. It was shown at the North American edition of the company's "Reverso Stories" exhibition in New York. The exhibition has toured globally from 2023 to the present, traveling across Chengdu, Seoul, Singapore, Zurich, New York, and Miami. As part of this project, Kang delivered a keynote for Jaeger-LeCoultre at Watches and Wonders Geneva in 2023, which was also attended by Jaeger-LeCoultre chief executive Catherine Rénier.

In September 2023, Kang's Only in the Dark premiered as part of the fall programme of Art on theMART in Chicago, which projects artworks onto the river-facing facade of the Merchandise Mart.

Kang was one of eleven artists in Decoding Korea at the Grand Palais Immersif in Paris, held from July 26 to August 25, 2024, as part of the "2024 Korea Season" programme accompanying the 2024 Summer Olympics. The exhibition was organised by South Korea's Ministry of Culture, Sports and Tourism with the Korea Arts Management Service.

Kang's 2026 exhibitions include Illumination, a solo exhibition held at the Fondation Fiminco in Romainville, France, co-curated by the Korean Cultural Center in France and Fondation Fiminco to commemorate the 140th anniversary of diplomatic relations between South Korea and France, as well as Superposition 2.0 in Busan.

In 2026, Kang spoke at TED 2026 Main Stage in Vancouver, Canada. Her talk, titled "The case for making art in a crisis", argued that art is not a luxury but a means of understanding and acting on large-scale problems.

== Selected solo projects, solo exhibitions ==
- Casting (2016), Victoria and Albert Museum, London
- Deep Surface (2017) (for Max Mara), Dongdaemun Design Plaza, Seoul
- Beyond the Scene (2020), Connect, BTS, Dongdaemun Design Plaza, Seoul
- Anthropause (2021), PKM Gallery, Seoul
- Geofuture (2022)
- Origin (2023), Jaeger-LeCoultre
- Passage of Water (2023), Google Arts & Culture and NASA; COP28, Dubai
- Only in the Dark (2023), Art on theMART, Chicago
- Light Architecture (2024), DDP, Seoul
- Entanglement (2025), SSG Heritage Museum, Seoul
- Illumination (2026), Fondation Fiminco, Romainville

== Selected publications ==
Selected academic publications by Kang include:

- Kang, Yiyun (2018). Casting: site-specific projection mapping installation. ACM. doi:10.1145/3202918.3203084. ISBN 978-1-4503-5778-4.
- Kang, Yiyun (2020). "Investigation of Projection Mapping's Spatiality in a Continuum of Projected Moving-Image Art". In Menotti, Gabriel; Crisp, Virginia (eds.). Practices of projection: histories and technologies. New York: Oxford University Press. ISBN 978-0-19-093412-5.
- Kang, Yiyun; Choi, Jeanyoon (2025). "Passage of Water : Artistic Exploration of Earth's Freshwater with Google and NASA". Leonardo. 58 (1): 14–22. doi:10.1162/leon_a_02611. ISSN 0024-094X.
- Choi, Jeanyoon; Hwang, Intae; Park, SeJoon; Cho, Hyungjun; Bae, Heejae; Kang, Yiyun (2026). SoTA: An Interactive Art Exhibition for Public AI Engagement. ACM. doi:10.1145/3800645.3812889. ISBN 979-8-4007-2563-0.
- Kang, Yiyun (2026). "Light Architecture: Translating the AI Black Box into Immersive Experience 34". Proceedings of the ACM on Computer Graphics and Interactive Techniques. 9 (3): 1–12. doi:10.1145/3816075. ISSN 2577-6193.
