= Bethan Laura Wood =

British designer (born 1983)

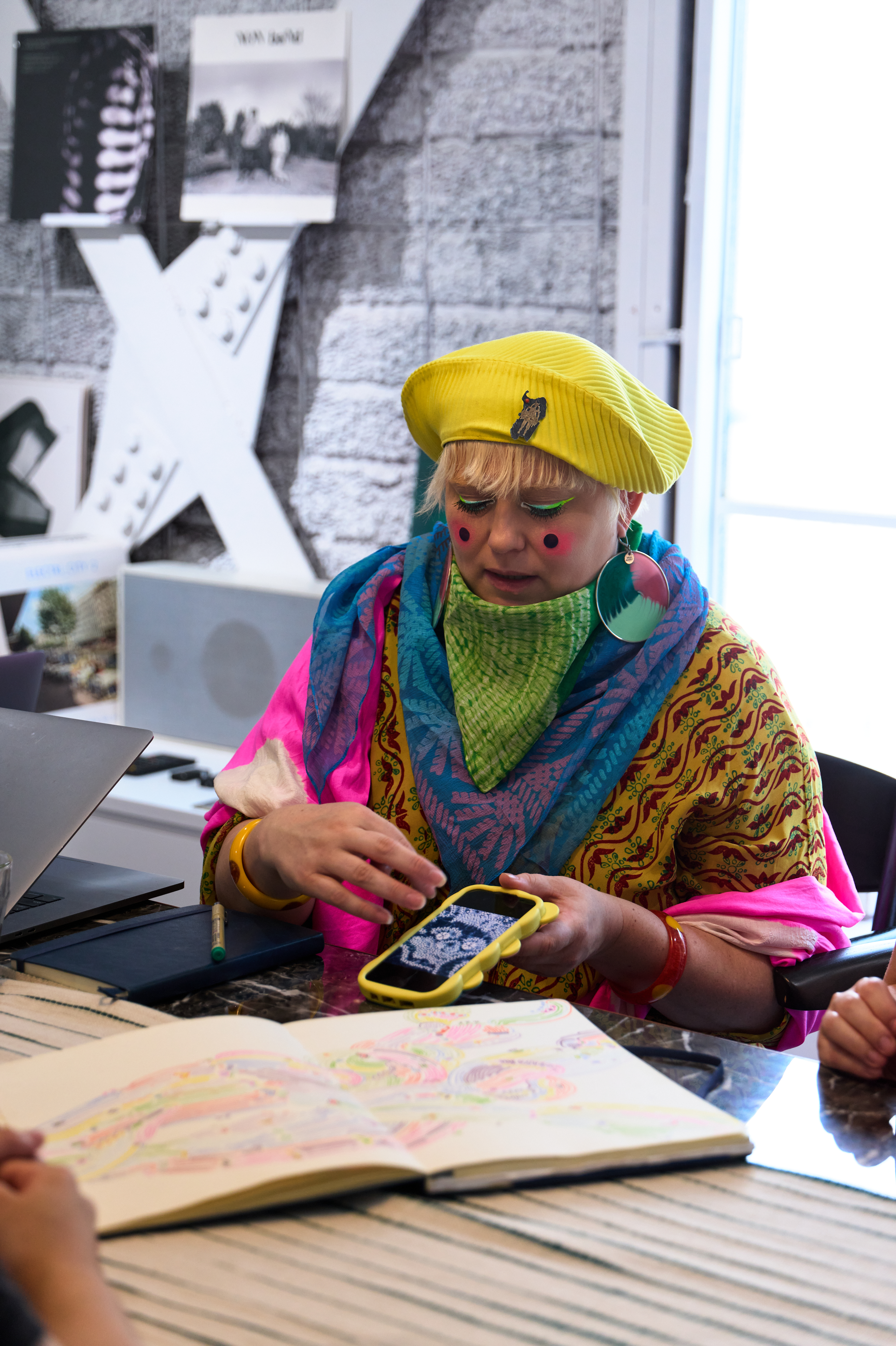
- Wood visits Suzusan textile workshop, Arimatsu, Aichi, Japan (2025)
- Born: 1983 (age 42–43)
- Education: University of Brighton; Royal College of Art
- Website: bethanlaurawood.com

Bethan Laura Wood (born 1983) is an internationally recognised English multidisciplinary designer of furniture, decorative objects, lighting, accessories, textiles, and installations. She has designed for media such as glass, laminated wood veneer, and ceramics. Work produced by Bethan Laura Wood Studio is characterised by materials investigation, artisan collaboration, and a passion for detail, colour, geometry, visual metaphor, pattern, and marquetry. She has been described as "re-contextualizing...elements from everyday objects, often focusing on the pattern and coloration of objects as indicators of their origins, production, and past usage."

== Early life and education ==
Wood was born in 1983 and grew up in Shropshire. She was diagnosed with dyslexia while attending sixth-form college. She studied 3D design at Brighton University, then studied at the Royal College of Art in 2007, tutored by Dutch designer Jurgen Bey and the Italian designer Martino Gamper. While still a student, in 2009 she founded Bethan Laura Wood Studio in London.

== Career ==
Wood has been commissioned by a variety of international companies to create works and installations, including Abet Laminati, Moroso, Valextra, Perrier Jouët, Bitossi Ceramiche, Tory Burch, cc-tapis, Tolix, Rosenthal, and Hermés.

Her work has been exhibited at the Design Museum, V&A Museum of Childhood and the V&A, Swiss Institute Contemporary Art New York, Daelim Museum in Seoul, the Museum of Contemporary Art, Tokyo, amongst others. She was also a designer in residence at the London Design Museum.

In 2016, her work was shown in the Dresden Kunstgewerbemuseum in an exhibition called Friends+Design. The show was curated by Tulga Beyerle and Maria Cristina Didero, and featured works by designers including Philippe Malouin, Richard Hutten, Michael Young, and Wood working together on specially commissioned pieces that "testify to the time, the affection and the trust that form the bond between...very different people."

Wood was named in the 2019 Wallpaper* Power 200, ranking her "among the world's pre-eminent design talent".

In 2025, the Design Museum in London launched a new initiative called PLATFORM, "an annual display dedicated to showcasing contemporary design practice". Its inaugural edition focused on Wood's work and career. Also in 2025, she was invited to Japan to take part in the Tokai Project, the second edition of the Craft x Tech initiative. The programme is an exploration of how traditional "aesthetic sensibilities embedded in Japanese craft can be reimagined through a thoughtful and skillful creative process" and reinterpreted through the lens of contemporary design and technology. Wood's project was a collaboration with textile artisan Hiroyuki Murase of Suzusan of Arimatsu Narumi Shibori on a piece called Kataginu. The work was exhibited in the Daylit Gallery of the Victoria and Albert Museum during the 2026 London Design Festival.

In 2026, the French crystal manufacturer Baccarat unveiled a new modular concept by Wood for its traditional chandeliers, which it described as "somewhere between a science-fiction wormhole and the interlacing of Elizabethan garters".

Wood has participated in design juries, panels, workshops, and symposia, and has lectured widely in both the UK and internationally.

== Awards ==
Year	Award	Category	Piece	Result
2019	German Design Awards	Outstanding Product	Tongue with Rosenthal	Won
2019	The Design Museum	Beazley Designs of the Year	Super Fake with CC-Tapis	Nominated
2019	EDIDA Design Awards	Floor Covering	Super Fake with CC-Tapis	Won
2019	The ELLE Decoration British Design Awards	Floor Covering		Won
2019	The ELLE Decoration Japan EDIDA Design Award	Floor Covering		Won
2017	The Design Prize	Artist Realm		Nominated
2016	London Design Festival, London Design Medal	British Land Swarovski Emerging Talent Medal		Won
2016	Hublot Design Prize			Finalist
2013	Design Miami	Designer of the Future		Won
2013	W Hotels Designers of the Future Award	Making Connections		
2012	The Design Museum	Design of the Year – Furniture	Moon Rock	Nominated
2012	The Design Museum	Design of the Year – Furniture	Moon Rock	Nominated

== Recognition ==
- 2012 – One of 850 alumni invited to Diamond jubilee Royal academy of Arts Gala in attendants of the Queen.
- 2012 – MUDAC – Totem no.5 purchased for permanent collection.
- 2013 – Abet Museum – Play time table purchased for permanent collection.
- 2019 – Judge for 2019 Dezeen Awards.
- 2019 – The Welcome Collection, Being Human – permanent gallery – commissioned project Epidemic Jukebox
- 2020 – V & A – Toothpaste bag designed for Valextra (acquired for permanent collection).
- 2021 – Bitossi Museum – permanent collection – Guadalupe Vase & drawings
- 2021 – The Art Institute of Chicago, acquired for Permanent Collection – Stain willow pattern
- 2021 – San Francisco Museum of Modern Art, Accessions Committee Fund Purchase criss cross Kite
- 2023 – National Galley of Victoria (Aus) NGV x MECCA Women in Design Commission – Kaleidoscope-o-Rama bookcase and Carpet (acquired for permanent collection)
- 2025 – MECCA flagship acquisition commission – Criss Cross Kite Grande Dame chandelier

== Select exhibitions ==
- 2011 – Nilufar gallery during Salone del Mobile with pieces such as Totem, a lighting collection made from Pyrex in collaboration with master glass-blower Pietro Viero.
- 2013 – Aram Gallery – Solo show.
- 2014 – Kvadvat – Divina celebration exhibition, Milan Salone – Guadalupe Daybed
- 2015 – Nilufar Gallery – Milan Salone exhibition – Temple Collection
- 2015 – Tory Burch and Wallpaper*magazine – Touring Installation – Milan, Munich, New York – Canapé
- 2016 – Designjunction – Dyslexic Design.
- 2016 – Nilufar Gallery – Salone Milan – CrissCross, Hula and Melon Tables
- 2016: The British Land Celebration of Design awards exhibition in Broadgate, London.
- 2016: Friends + Design, SKD Museum, Dresden
- 2018 – Aram Gallery – Designers select designers.
- 2017 – Bijenkorf and Rijksmuseum Museum – Room on the Roof Residency Amsterdam – Afterparty Sweet Dreams in collaboration with the TextielMuseum, Tilburg
- 2017 – Nilufar Gallery – Salone Milan – Trellis Collection
- 2017 – G.F.Smith paper – Hull City of Culture – Seaweed kites installation
- 2017 – Peter Pilotto – London Fashion Week Commission Ready-to-Wear A/W 2017 Townhouse installation – Sputnik floor lamps
- 2018 – Perrier-Jouët Champagne Collectors’ Lounge, Design Miami – Scenography – HyperNature Landscape
- 2018 – Designart Tokyo Festival – Perrier-Jouët Champagne – Commission – HyperNature Sculpture
- 2018 – Moroso – Milan Showroom solo installation for Salone – Mono Mania Mexico
- 2018 – CC-Tapis – Rug Collection – Super Fake
- 2018 – Valextra – SS18 collection installation – Toothpaste
- 2018 – Perrier-Jouët Champagne Terrace Masterpiece – Scenography – HyperNature herbarium
- 2019 – Solo Exhibition inaugurating new Nilufar 25 Exhibition Space, Milan – Details.
- 2020 – V & A museum London – Exhibition Bags: Inside Out – Toothpaste bag
- 2021 – Dior, Miss Dior 12 women artists exhibition (named collaborator) – Flower Folly travelling exhibition
- 2021 – Nilufar Gallery, Solo Show – Ornate – celebrating 10 years of collaboration with Nilufar Gallery – Ornate, Meisen, BonBon and Aperitivo.
- 2021 – Dubai design week – Women in Design – Exhibition – Super Fake Rugs & Guest Speaker
- 2022 – Nilufar Gallery,(IT) A summer Room – new works – Endless Meisen, Trellis column, totem no.11.
- 2022 – San Francisco Museum of Modern Art (USA) – Convesation Pieces – Exhibition – Criss Cross Kite chandelier
- 2022 – The Drawing Center NY (USA) – The Clamor of the Ornament – Sketchbooks, Toothpaste handbags
- 2022 – Nicoletta Fiorucci Foundation (UK) Group show – Collaboration with Jochen Holz – Martino and Friends – Our Lady of Guadalope
- 2022 – PAD london (UK) – Nilufar Gallery – Meisen Caterpillar
- 2023 – National Galley of Victoria (Aus) NGV x MECCA Women in Design Commission – Kaleidoscope-o-Rama bookcase and Carpet (acquired for permanent collection)
- 2024 – Nicoletta Fiorucci Foundation (UK) Travelling Bluestocking Salon – Mother Tongue Presented by Nicoletta Fiorucci
- 2024 – cc-tapis Headquarters (IT) – Travelling Bluestocking Salon – Salon Talk and installation
- 2024 – Vitra Haus (Switzerland) Home sweet home – Group Bird house exhibition – Paradise Perch
- 2024 – Nuovo gallery (HK) – Solo Exhibition As seem Though the lens of Nilufar and cc-tapis – Multiple Furniture, lighting and carpets pieces
- 2025 – Platform, Design Museum, London
- 2025 – Byredo Takeover (IT) – (named collaborator), THE KIOSK, THE CARGO BIKE, BYREDO MILAN FLAGSHIP
- 2025 – Triennale Milano (IT) – 24th International Exhibition, titled Inequalities – group show – Olive Mirror
- 2026 – Kudan House, Tokyo (JP) – Craft x Tech Tokai Project

== Collections ==
Wood has works included in the permanent collections of the Wellcome Collection in London, London (Epidemic Jukebox in partnership with Kin design); V&A, London Victoria and Albert Museum (Toothpaste bag for Valextra); Dresden State Art Collections, Germany (Friends bed); Abet Laminate Museum, Italy (Playtime table); and Mudac, Switzerland (Totem No.5) and The Art Institute of Chicago (Stain), SFMOMA (Criss Cross Kite), and National Gallery of Victoria (Kaleidoscope-o-rama). In 2025, Wood was invited to be the subject of the inaugural exhibition of PLATFORM, an annual display dedicated to showcasing contemporary design practices at the Design Museum in London, marking her first solo show in a museum context.

== See also ==
- Adam Nathaniel Furman
- Yinka Ilori
- Yayoi Kusama
- Morag Myerscough
