= London Design Festival =

Annual arts event in the United Kingdom

London Design Festival (LDF)
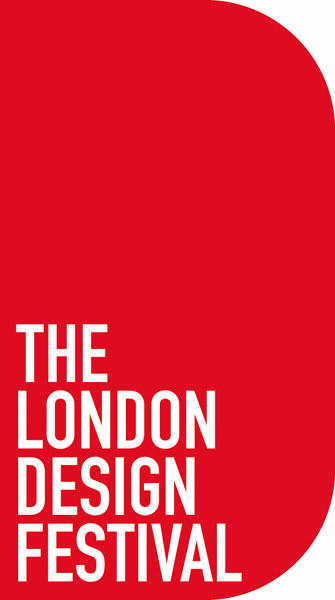
- LDF 2019 logo designed by Pentagram

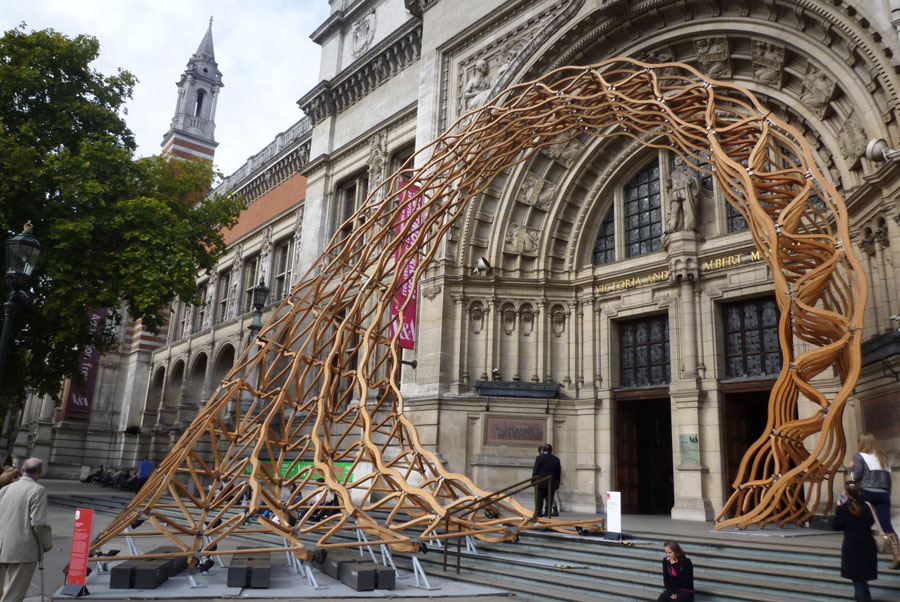
- Amanda Levete's Timber Wave frames the main Cromwell Road entrance of the Victoria and Albert Museum (2011)
- Genre: Annual cultural event for the promotion of art, architecture, craft, and design
- Venue: Victoria and Albert Museum; Design Museum; (et al.)
- Location: London
- Country: UK
- Founded: 2003
- Founders: Ben Evans CBE; Sir John Sorrell
- Most recent: September 2025
- Next event: 12 September–20 September 2026
- Participants: > 2,000
- Attendance: > 1 million
- Major events: Culture, education, and commerce (includes the Global Design Forum and the London Design Awards)
- Leader: Ben Evans
- Organiser: IDEA Operations Ltd.
- Sponsor: Mayor of London; Bloomberg Philanthropies
- Website: londondesignfestival.com

The London Design Festival (LDF) is an annual cultural event that takes place throughout London every September. It was founded in 2003 by Ben Evans and John Sorrell. In the nearly 25 years since its inception, LDF has become an important part of the global cultural events calendar along with the Frieze Art Fair, BFI London Film Festival, London Fashion Week, and the BBC Proms. It has generated over a billion pounds of economic activity in the past decade.

The 24th edition of LDF ran from 12 to 20 September 2026, with "craft and artificial intelligence [sitting] alongside one another as historic techniques are revisited through contemporary collaborations ... and cultural exchange".

== History and festival overview ==
The inaugural edition of the London Design Festival took place from 20 to 28 September 2003 and brought together "90 speakers in over 60 events throughout the capital ... celebrating the UK as the world capital for the creative industries, recognising the vital contribution they make to the UK economy." By 2017 LDF participation had grown significantly as the audience rose to 420,000, increasing further to 600,000 attendees in 2019. More than 2,000 design businesses, brands, universities, and other organisations now participate in the festival each year.

The LDF sponsors exhibitions, talks, tours, educational initiatives and workshops, product launches, and open studios, as well as curating a programme of "Landmark Projects" and various special commissions from its base at the Victoria and Albert Museum (V&A), the Design Museum, and other venues throughout the city – stretching from Kingston upon Thames to the Battersea Power Station to Queen Elizabeth Olympic Park and the Greenwich Peninsula.

=== Landmark Projects and special commissions ===
Working with architects, designers, and engineers together with design businesses, brands and manufacturers, artisans, craftspeople and trade associations, municipal bodies, educational institutions and other community and cultural organisations has resulted in a wide and diverse variety of Landmark Projects and special commissions.

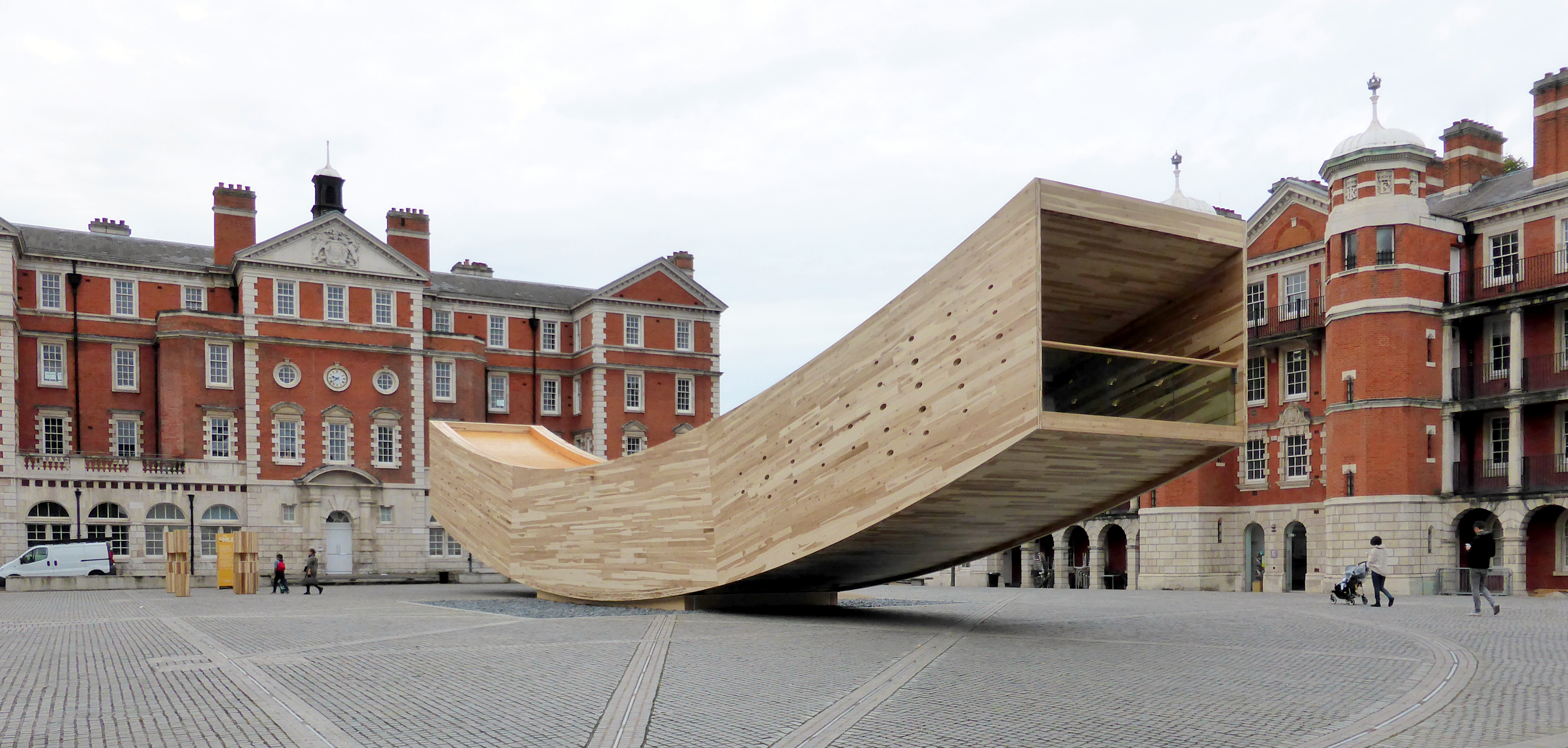
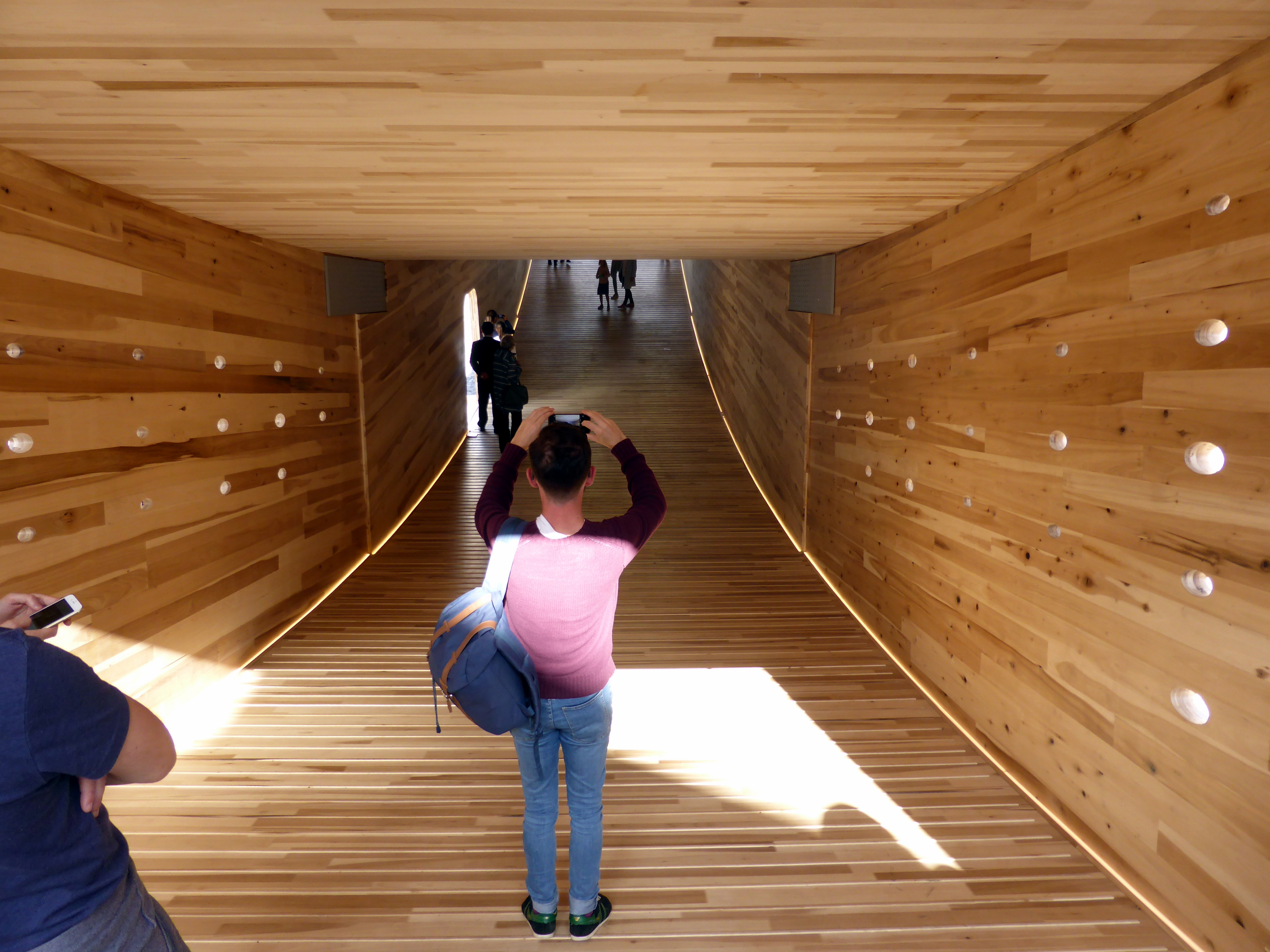
The Smile designed by Alison Brooks (in collaboration with American Hardwood Export Council and Arup) at the Chelsea College of Arts (2016)

Previous examples include Sclera by David Adjaye (2008), an exhibition at the V&A called In Praise of Shadows curated by Jane Withers (2009),Timber Wave designed by Amanda Levete's AL_A (2011), Endless Stair by Alex de Rijke, and an installation in the Daylit Gallery called Wind Portal by the artist and designer Najla El Zein that included 5,000 spinning paper windmills (2013), The Smile by Alison Brooks (2016), Camille Walala's inflatable castle behind Liverpool Street Station (2017), MultiPly by the architects Waugh Thistleton, as well as Es Devlin's Google AI enabled poetry reciting lions (2018), Bamboo Ring by Kengo Kuma (2019), Medusa by Tin Drum and Sou Fujimoto (2021), Into Sight and Affinity in Autonomy by Sony Design (2019, 2022), Bring London Together by Yinka Ilori and Sonic Bloom by Yuri Suzuki (2021), Sabine Marcelis's swivelling stone chairs on St Giles Square (2022), Spirit of Place by Simone Brewster (2023), The Sun, My Heart by Marjan van Aubel and Duo by Melek Zeynep Bulut (2024), What Nelson Sees by Paul Cocksedge in Trafalgar Square (2025), and the Pangolin Shield by Studio Saar and Atelier One in Aldwych, the Craft x Tech Tokai Project by Tangent in the Daylit Gallery, and the Art of Sound by L-Acoustics in the Wapping Hydraulic Power Station (2026).

=== Location ===
Since 2009, the Victoria and Albert museum has been the central hub for the LDF, celebrating 14 years of partnership in 2022. It has been called the "true epicentre" of the festival. Museum director Tristram Hunt said the "London Design Festival occupies a vital role in London's thriving design sector, reaffirming London's position as one of the world's leading global design capitals." Referring to LDF’s V&A residency, Ben Evans, the festival's director remarked, "I still have to pinch myself that they let us come and play in their museum".

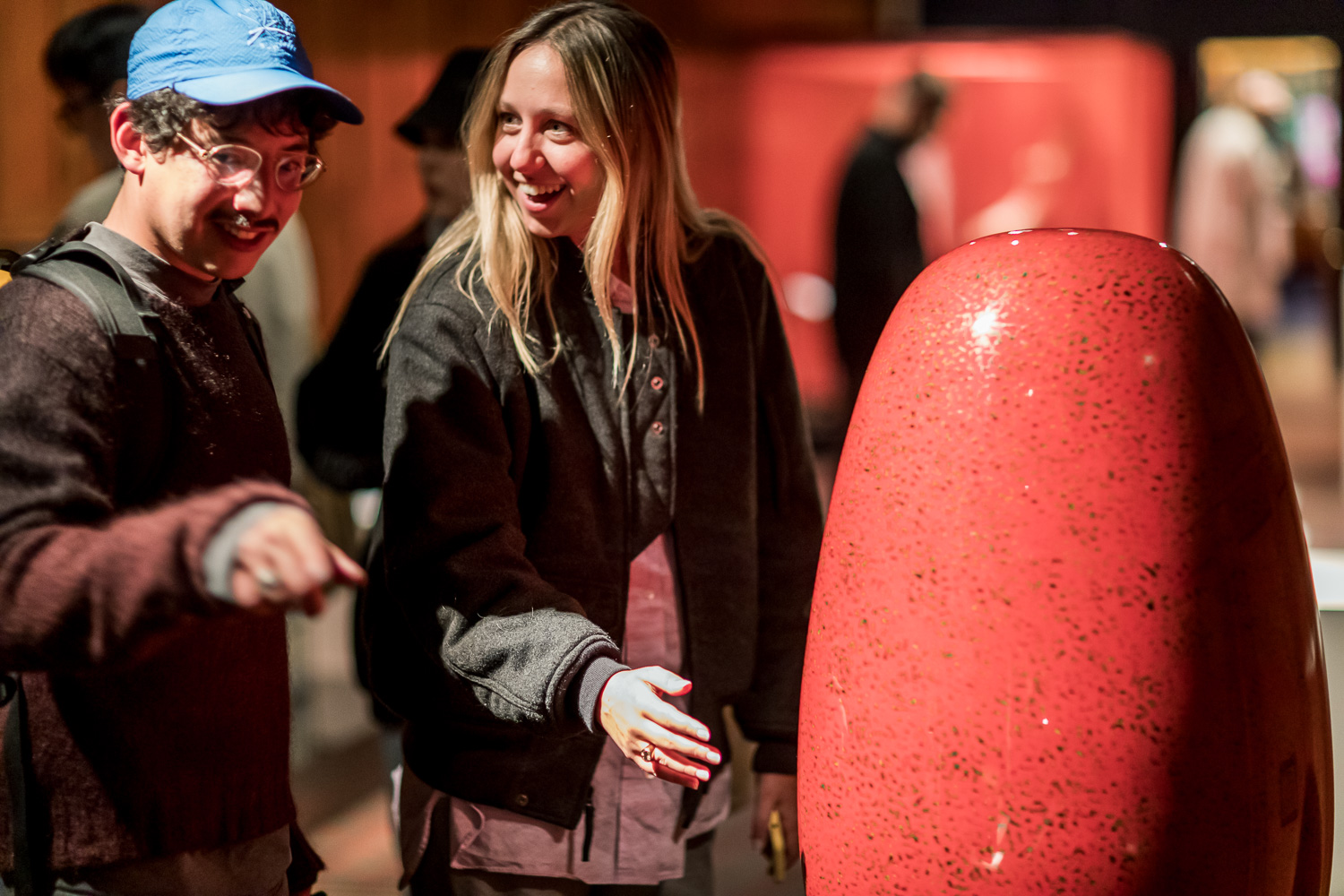
Festival goers interact with a display in the Craft x Tech Tohoku Project exhibition in the V&A's Prince Consort Gallery (2024)

The festival subdivides London into a number of "design districts" such as Bankside, Brompton (the LDF's main V&A locale), Pimlico Road, Clerkenwell, King's Cross, Chelsea, Soho, and the Greenwich Peninsula. These districts function as semi-autonomous entities within the overall LDF. Other such districts that have taken part in the festival over the years include Mayfair, Islington, Park Royal, William Morris Design Line, Southwark, Paddington Central, Clerkenwell, West Kensington, Marylebone, Fitzrovia, Hackney, Dalston to Stokey, Chelsea, and the festival’s largest official district, an event known as Shoreditch Design Week.

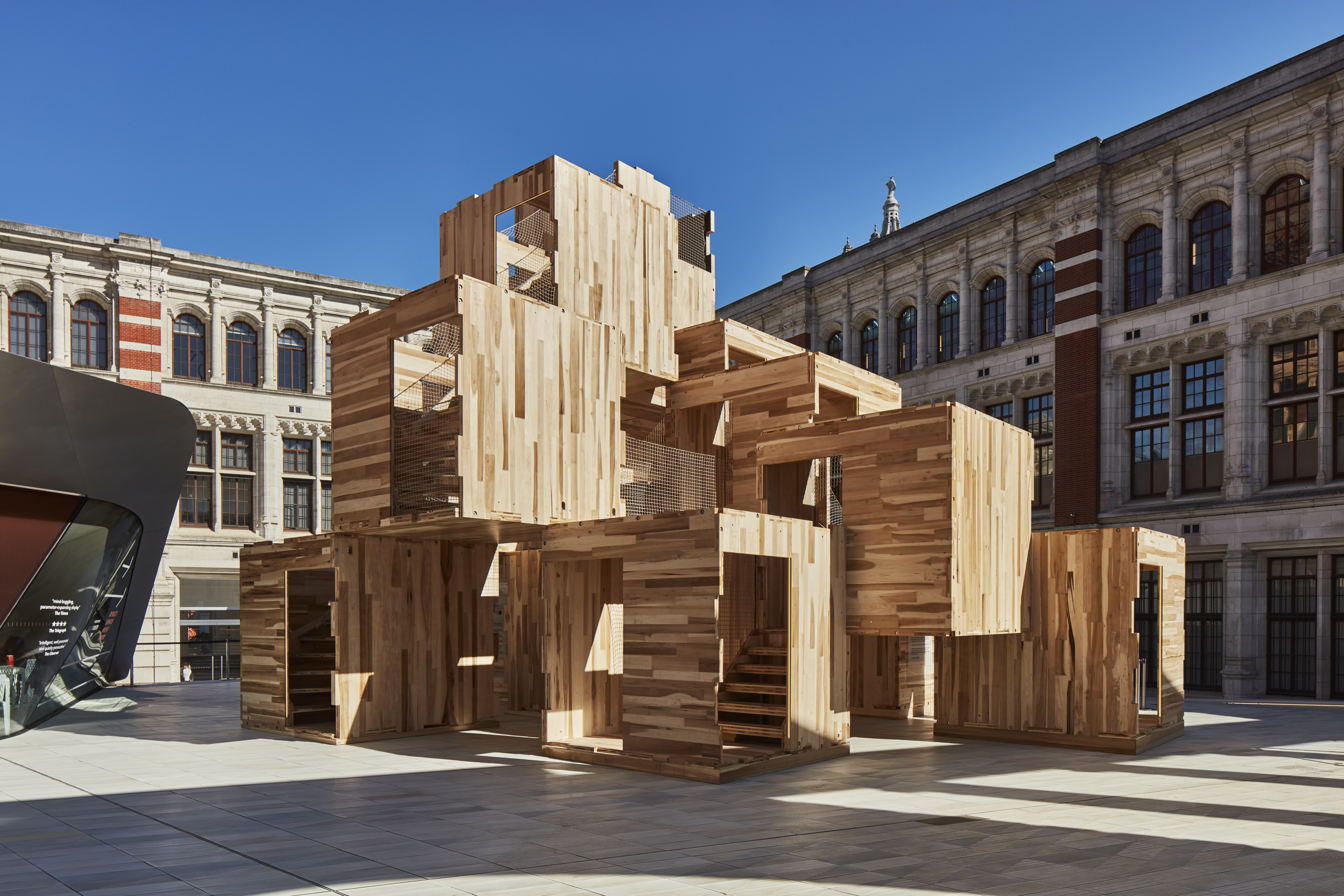
MultiPly designed by Waugh Thistleton Architects in the ex-Sackler Courtyard at the V&A (2018)

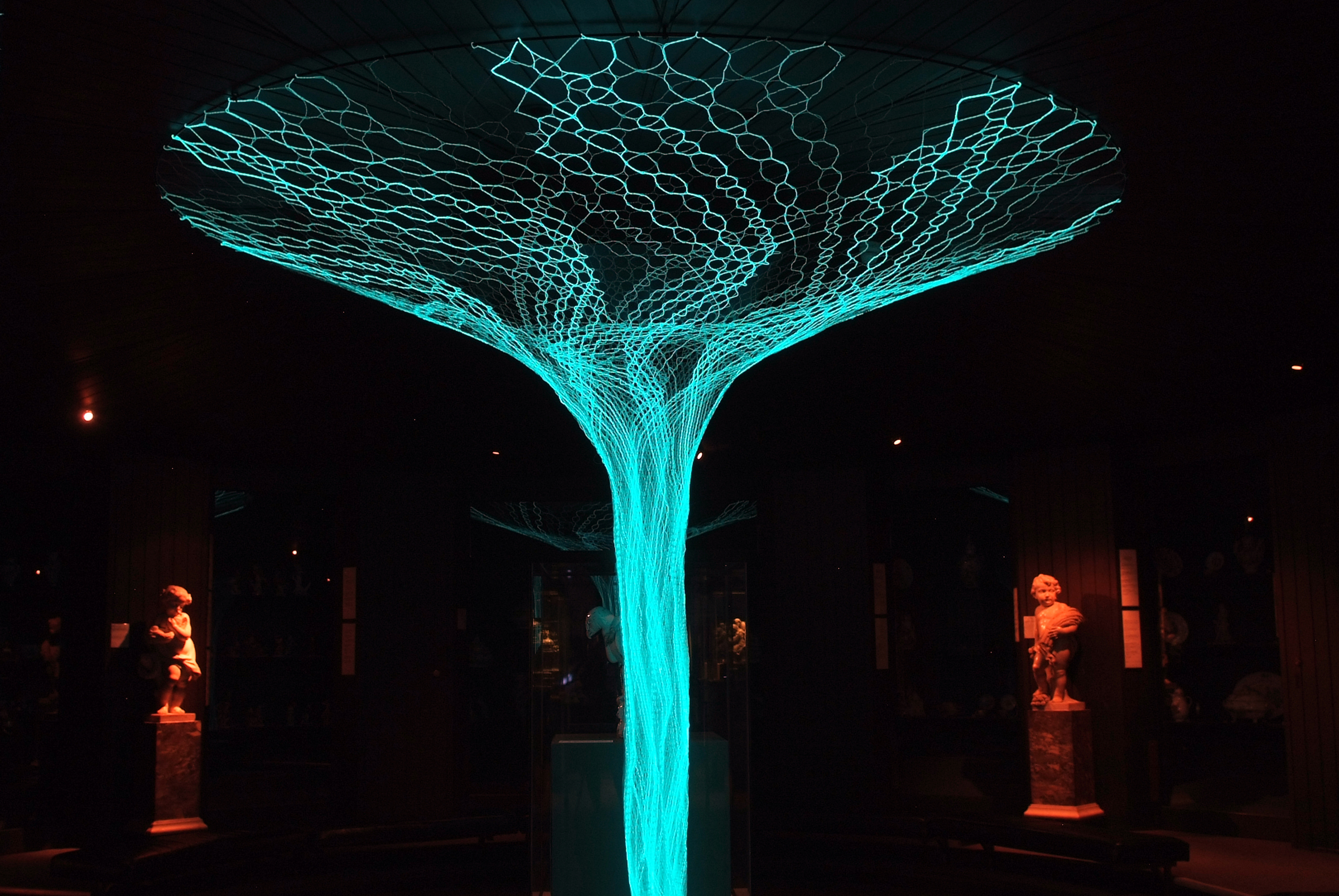
Sonumbra by Rachel Wingfield and Matthias Gmachl pictured in the In Praise of Shadows exhibition at the V&A (2009)

=== Global Design Forum ===
The festival also features a thought-leadership programme called the Global Design Forum (GDF) which includes talks, keynotes, daily tours, and workshops. The programme takes place in venues within the V&A such as the Exhibition Road Courtyard, Rotunda, various galleries, and the Lydia and Manfred Gorvy Lecture Theatre, as well as other locations throughout the city.

The inaugural edition of the GDF took place in 2012 at Central Saint Martins campus in King's Cross. Featured speakers included Joseph Grima in conversation with Zaha Hadid, Yves Béhar, Thomas Heatherwick, and Morag Myerscough. By 2019, the forum had grown to 50 speakers from 18 countries and 2,800 participants, and had moved its primary venue to the V&A’s Lecture Theatre. This edition included a wide and diverse cohort of speakers such as David King, Vivienne Westwood, Kwame Kwei-Armah, Mark Miodownik, and Kengo Kuma.

The GDF has continued to expand its international participation and scope with themes like Please Design Responsibly, The Healthy City, Resilience and Repair, and More than Human. The 2025 edition was themed Design At / From The Seams and explored the "radical interdependence between peoples, practices, and the planet", while the 2026 edition curated by Rhiarna Dhaliwal is titled Worlds in Motion and will feature speakers such as Es Devlin, Adam Nathaniel Furman, Natalie Melton, Kassia St. Clair, and Liam Young.

The Global Design Forum's international reach extends to GDF events hosted in cities other than London. In May 2026 the Forum was held in Istanbul, Turkey. The event featured talks with local creative industry professionals and international architects, artists, curators, and designers such as Hussein Chalayan, Tom Dixon, Lina Ghotmeh, Prem Krishnamurthy, Beatrice Leanza, Lesley Lokko, Dominique Petit-Frère, Ma Yansong and Marina Tabassum. It was a four-day citywide event organised by the LDF's parent company, curator Beatrice Galilee, and local partners People Places Ideas. The primary event, organised around the theme Worlds in Contact, was held in the Hagia Irene, a former Byzantine church—one of only two still standing in Istanbul today (the other being the Hagia Sophia). As part of the event, specially commissioned installations were installed in the Topkapı Palace complex and throughout the city. It was the first Global Design Forum to be held outside of the UK.

=== Graphic identity and logo ===
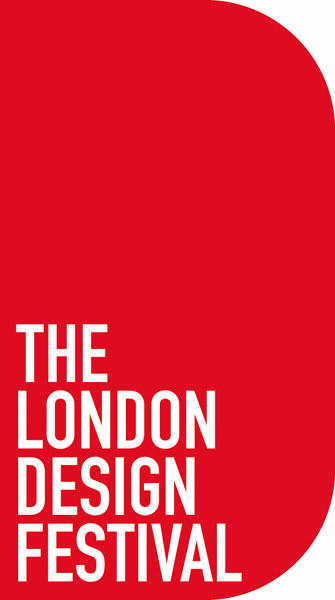
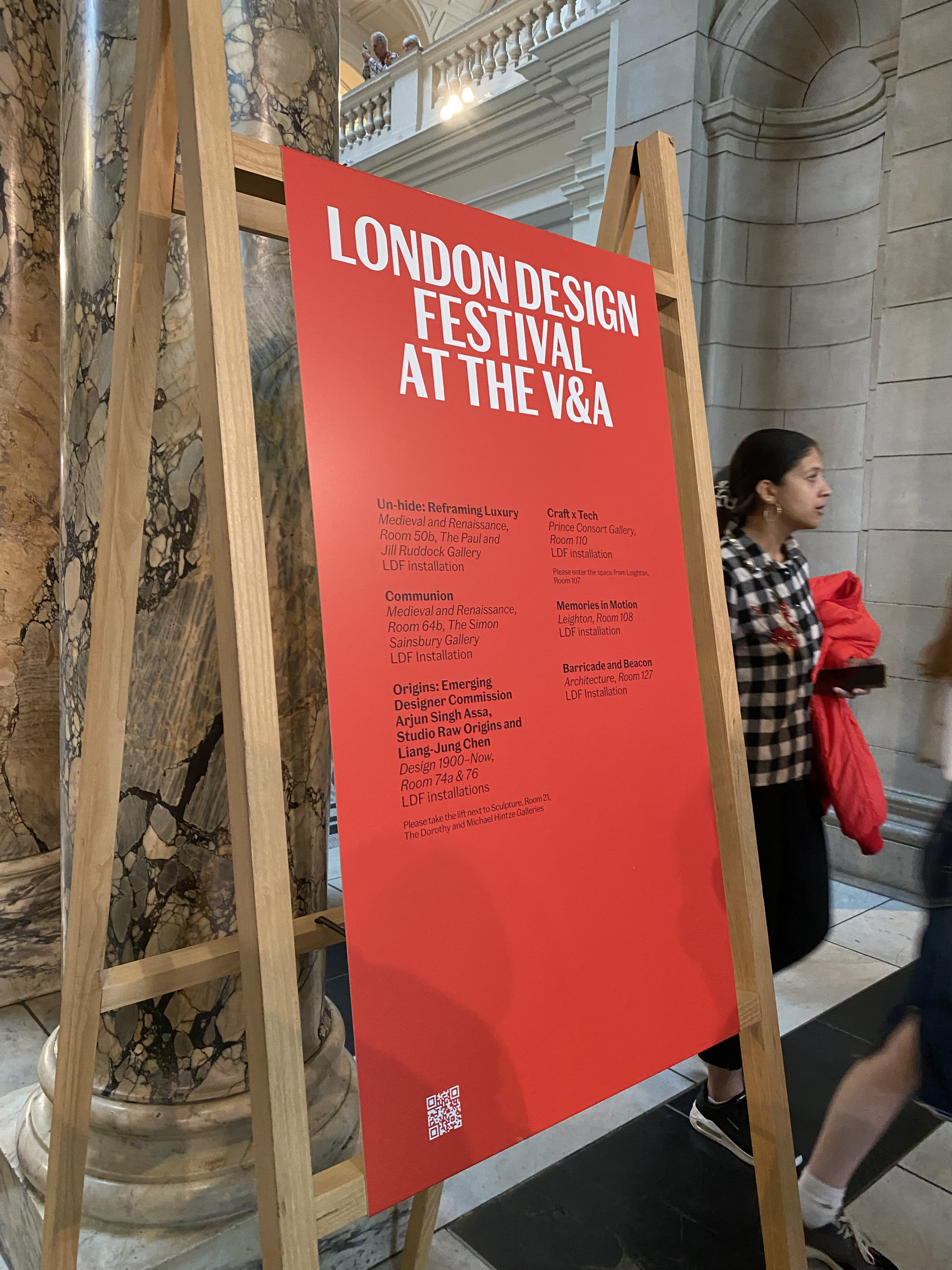
LDF 2019 logo and an informational placard pictured at the V&A (2024)

The design consultancy Pentagram has created the LDF graphics since 2007. Each year, this includes a thematic variation of the festival's red LDF logo wordmark as part of its overall graphic identity. The theme of the festival's 2026 edition is Framing LDF.

== Impact ==
As of 2025, the London Design Festival comprises over 400 events and exhibitions staged by more than 300 partner organisations across the design spectrum and from around the world. By 2015 the LDF was estimated to contribute nearly £80 million annually to London's economy. According to the Creative Industries Council, by 2019 the LDF "attracted 1.1 million visits ... with more than one third of them from overseas [and] contributed an estimated £118 million ... to the London economy", creating almost 3,000 additional full time equivalent jobs.

Over the nearly two and a half decades since its inception, the festival has grown to become a significant gathering for the international architecture and design community know "world-over for its temporary, unfailingly iconic, installations." Post-Brexit, and again post-Pandemic, the LDF was also credited with helping London maintain its position as a global design capital.

In a 2022 interview, LDF director Ben Evans recollected, "We consciously founded the London Design Festival to be public-spirited. Over the last 20 years, the Festival has had incredible depth of penetration and success in bringing people together and distilling new ideas."

In 2026, Sadiq Khan, the Mayor of London stated that "over the past 10 years [the LDF] has helped to unlock £1.23 billion for the economy through jobs and investment."

== Awards ==
Each year a jury of established designers, industry experts, critics and commentators, as well as previous award recipients choose a new cohort of awardees across the four categories of the London Design Medals. The winners are selected from a wide range of disciplines and recognised for significant contributions to their respective fields. The inaugural medal was awarded to Zaha Hadid in 2007.

The British equivalent of international design prizes like the Compasso d’Oro (Italy), iF Product and Red Dot (Germany), G-Mark Good Design Award (Japan), AIGA medal, National Design Awards, and Pritzker Prize (US), the London Design Medal is considered a “major award” in the field.

LDF's Ben Evans explains that, "While there is no shortage of design awards, we wanted to do it differently. So we took the Nobel Prize route – there's no shortlist, just a winner. So that means there [are] no losers either."

The prize medals themselves are created each year by jewellery designer Hannah Martin and feature a London bird, the Cockney Sparrow, in flight.

=== The London Design Medal categories ===
- London Design Medal: The highest accolade bestowed upon an individual who has distinguished themselves within the industry and demonstrated consistent design excellence.
- Design Innovation Medal: Celebrates entrepreneurship in all its forms, both locally and internationally. It honours an individual for whom design lies at the core of their development and success.
- Emerging Talent Medal: Recognises an impact made on the design scene within five or so years of graduation.
- Lifetime Achievement Medal: Honours a significant and fundamental contribution to the design industry throughout a career.

=== Medal winners ===
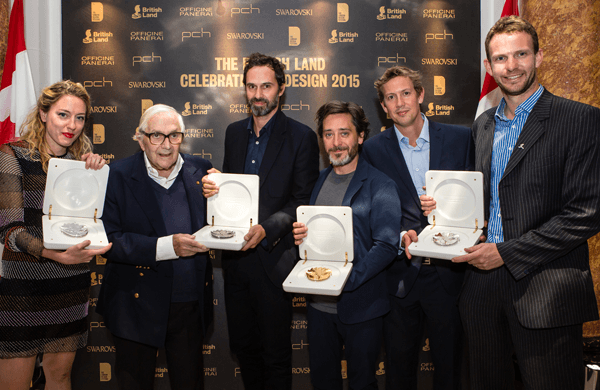
2015 Medallists: Marjan Van Aubel, Ken Adam, Edward Barber, Jay Osgerby, Will Crawford, and Peter Brewin

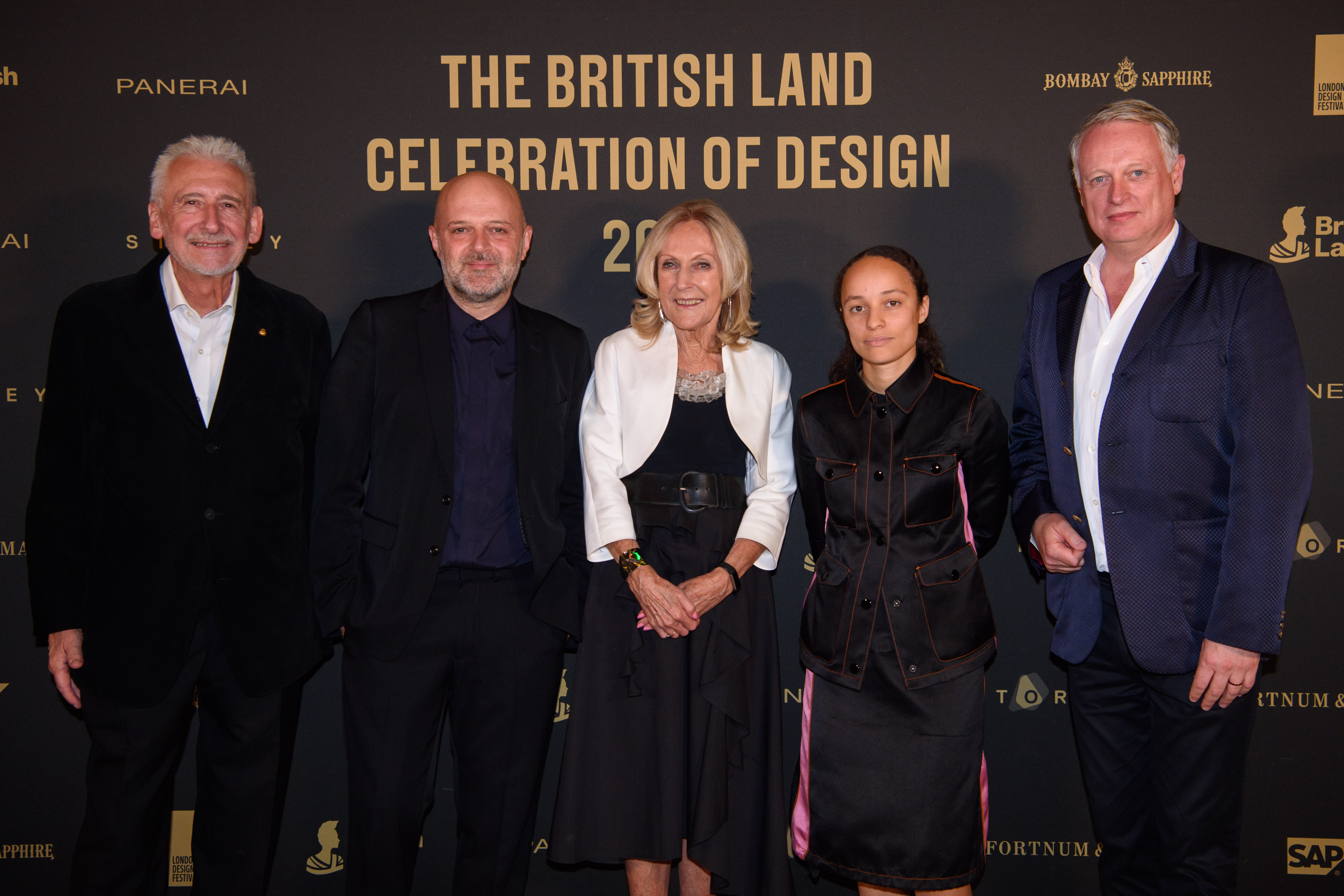
2018 Medallists: Hussein Chalayan, Eva Jiricna, and Grace Wales Bonner flanked by London Design Festival Co-founders Sir John Sorrell (left) and Ben Evans (right). Not pictured: Neri Oxman

- Sir Ken Adam, Lifetime Achievement Medal (2015)
- Sir David Adjaye, London Design Medal (2016)
- Pooja Agrawal, Design Innovation Medal (2023)
- Michael Anastassiades, London Design Medal (2025)
- Jonathan Anderson, London Design Medal (2026)
- Paola Antonelli, London Design Medal (2020)
- Ron Arad, London Design Medal (2011)
- Ross Atkin, Emerging Design Medal (2019)
- Marjan van Aubel, Emerging Design Medal (2015)
- Edward Barber and Jay Osgerby, London Design Medal (2015)
- Grace Wales Bonner, Emerging Design Medal (2018)
- Ronan and Erwan Bouroullec, London Design Medal (2014)
- Peter Brewin and Will Crawford, Design Innovation Medal (2015)
- Sinéad Burke, Design Innovation Medal (2025)
- Margaret Calvert, Lifetime Achievement Medal, (2017)
- Hussein Chalayan, Panerai London Design Medal (2018)
- Daniel Charny, Design Innovation Medal (2019)
- Natsai Audrey Chieza, Design Innovation Medal (2024)
- Mac Collins, Emerging Design Medal (2021)
- Sir Terence Conran, Lifetime Achievement Medal (2012)
- David Constantine, Design Entrepreneur Medal (2013)
- Ilse Crawford, The London Design Medal (2021)
- Will Crawford and Peter Brewin, Design Innovation Medal (2015)
- Es Devlin, Panerai London Design Medal (2017)
- Tom Dixon, London Design Medal (2019)
- Robert Feo and Rosario Hurtado, London Design Medal (2012)
- Lord Norman Foster, Lifetime Achievement Medal (2025)
- Christopher Frayling, Lifetime Achievement Medal (2026)
- Ken Garland, Lifetime Achievement Medal (2020)
- Alexandra Daisy Ginsberg, Emerging Design Medal (2012)
- Kenneth Grange, Lifetime Achievement Medal (2016)
- Dame Zaha Hadid, London Design Medal (2007)
- Thomas Heatherwick, London Design Medal (2010)
- Harry Blackiston Houston, Emerging Design Medal (2024)
- Rosario Hurtado and Robert Feo, London Design Medal (2012)
- Yinka Ilori, Emerging Design Medal (2020)
- Anab Jain, Design Innovation Medal (2026)
- Eva Jiricna, Lifetime Achievement Medal (2018)
- Indy Johar, Design Innovation Medal (2022)
- Rei Kawakubo, Lifetime Achievement Medal (2024)
- Hanif Kara, London Design Medal (2023)
- Rio Kobayashi, Emerging Design Medal (2025)
- Roland Lamb, Emerging Design Medal (2014)
- Joycelyn Longdon, Emerging Design Medal (2022)
- Dame Ellen MacArthur, Design Innovation Medal (2020)
- Sir Don McCullin, Lifetime Achievement Medal (2022)
- Pat McGrath, London Design Medal (2024)
- Julian Melchiorri, Emerging Design Medal (2017)
- Marc Newson, London Design Medal (2008)
- Jane Ní Dhulchaointigh, Design Entrepreneur Medal (2012)
- Dame Magdalene Odundo, Lifetime Achievement Medal (2023)
- Jay Osgerby and Edward Barber, London Design Medal (2015)
- Neri Oxman, Design Innovation Medal (2018)
- Solveiga Pakštaitė, Emerging Design Medal (2026)
- Sandy Powell, London Design Medal (2022)
- Paul Priestman (PriestmanGoode), Design Innovation Medal (2017)
- POoR Collective (Power Out of Restriction), Emerging Design Medal (2023)
- Dieter Rams, Lifetime Achievement Medal (2013)
- Lord Richard Rogers, Lifetime Achievement Medal (2014)
- Nicolas Roope, Design Innovation Medal (2014)
- Daan Roosegaard, Design Innovation Medal (2016)
- Daniel Rybakken, Emerging Design Medal (2013)
- Vidal Sassoon, Lifetime Achievement Medal (2011)
- Peter Saville, London Design Medal (2013)
- Sir Paul Smith, London Design Medal (2009)
- Eyal Weizman, Design Innovation Medal (2021)
- Dame Vivienne Westwood, Lifetime Achievement Medal (2019)
- Michael Wolf, Lifetime Achievement Medal (2021)
- Bethan Laura Wood, Emerging Talent Medal (2016)

== See also ==
- British Council – Organisation promoting cultural and linguistic knowledge of the United Kingdom
- Crafts Council – United Kingdom charity for craft
- Cultural diplomacy – Exchange of culture between nations
- List of design awards
- List of awards considered the highest in a field
- List of design museums
