= Morag Myerscough =

British artist and designer

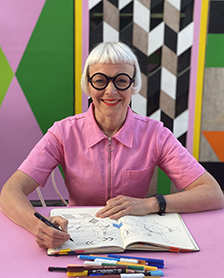
- Myerscough in 2020
- Born: December 1963 (age 62); Holloway, Islington, London, England
- Education: Grafton Primary School, Holloway, Islington; Highbury Hill High School, Islington; Central Saint Martins (BA); Royal College of Art (MA)
- Known for: Artist, designer
- Partner: Luke Morgan
- Awards: 2023 Honorary Doctor, Royal College of Art; 2020 Honorary Fellow, RIBA; 2019 Honorary Fellow, Central Saint Martins; 2019 Honorary Professorship, UCA; 2019 Honorary Doctorate, University of Gloucestershire; 2017 Royal Designer for Industry; 2012 Honorary Fellow, Arts University Bournemouth
- Website: moragmyerscough.com

Morag Myerscough RDI (born December 1963) is a British artist and designer known globally for creating installations and immersive spatial public artworks that transform places and champion community and public interaction. Myerscough is a prominent designer of supergraphics.

Myerscough was born 1963 in London's Holloway area and studied at Central St Martins and the Royal College of Art. She is a 2023 Honorary Doctor of the Royal College of Art and 2020 Honorary Fellow of the Royal Institute of British Architects UK. She was the exhibition designer for Designer Maker User, the Design Museum's first permanent display and founded Studio Myerscough in 1993.

Myerscough's first permanent installation was Power for the Grosvenor Arch, entrance to Battersea Power Station’s Circus West Village. Her awards include the Design Week award and the New London Architecture Award.

Myerscough's name appears in the credits for Danny Boyle's 1994 film Shallow Grave, for which she was the title designer. She appeared as a judge in the 2022 reality TV series The Big Design Challenge on Sky Arts.

== See also ==
- Adam Nathaniel Furman
- Yinka Ilori
- Yayoi Kusama
- Bethan Laura Wood
