= Ben Evans (designer) =

British design advocate and entrepreneur

- Spouse: Amanda Levete

Benedict Blackstone Evans CBE (born September 1963) is a British designer and design historian, entrepreneur, and creative industries advocate. He is the co-founder and director of the London Design Festival and the Global Design Forum, and the executive director of the London Design Biennale,

== Career ==
Ben Evans is director of the London Design Festival, which he co-founded in 2003, and co-produces with Sir John Sorrell. The Festival is an annual event involving 300 partner organisations and attracts over 900,000 individual visits. As well as managing the Festival, Evans initiates, commissions and curates projects for the event including an annual residency in the V&A museum; along with directing Global Design Forum.

In 2016 he added a new activity — London Design Biennale — with the third edition taking place in September 2020. This biannual exhibition, staged at Somerset House, invited participating countries and cities to exhibit original design installations in response to a theme. Installations were curated by museums and design organisations. Evans is the Executive Director of the Biennale.

Evans has been a governor of the University of the Arts London, a board member of the Roundhouse, and a trustee of Artangel. Since 2017 Evans has become Chairman of the Mayor's Cultural Leaders Board—a statutory advisory group to the London Mayor.

== Honours and awards ==
In 2010 Evans was awarded an honorary degree from the Royal College of Art, having lectured there for a number of years, and graduated from in 1989 with a MA in History Of Design.

In the 2019 Queen's Birthday Honours, Evans was appointed Commander of the Order of the British Empire (CBE) for services to the creative industries.

== Personal life ==
Evans was born in London. He married architect Amanda Levete in 2007 and has 3 children from his previous marriage. He is the son of Tom Evans and Tessa Blackstone. Evans is an Arsenal F.C. fan. He developed a keen interest in architecture and design upon attending a lecture delivered by Richard Rogers at the age of 15.
