= Queer Spaces (book) =

Queer Spaces: An Atlas of LGBT+ Places and Stories
- Author: Adam Nathaniel Furman and Joshua Mardell (Editors)
- Language: English
- Subject: Queer space, Architecture, Urban geography
- Genre: Anthology, Non-fiction
- Publisher: RIBA
- Publication date: 2022

Queer Spaces is a 2022 anthology book edited by Adam Nathaniel Furman and Joshua Mardell. It was published by RIBA.

== Contents ==
The book is a global survey chosen by writers, activists, film-makers, artists, researchers and urban geographers that meet their definition of a queer space. The foreword is written by Olivia Laing.

== Reception ==
Reviewing the book for The Guardian, critic Rowan Moore concluded that the book was " ... generous in range and rich in creativity. It doesn't try to draw conclusions, just to offer examples of what Furman calls "spaces where you can act freely in a manner that is truly consonant with your inner self". Which, really, is a fair definition of what all architecture should achieve". Moore felt that the book acknowledged its relationship to the 1997 book Queer Space by Aaron Betsky and that the newer book was "looser and broader" with a wider definition of queer. Moore identified themes of interiority "to create inner worlds protected from external aggression and misunderstanding", "ingenuity and subversion" and "a free and transgressive attitude to the conventions of architecture and construction" as prevalent in the creation of queer spaces.

Max L Zarzycki reviewed the book in a joint review with Wild Things: the Disorder of Desire by Jack Halberstam in the Architectural Review. Zarzycki described it as "a constellation of spaces both existing and past, that have been adopted or appropriated by queer communities as venues for the production of more radical ways of being and becoming". The spaces chosen highlight the "tense negotiations" with "visibility and legibility" with traditional places of power and "myriad resistances".

E.B. Boatner in Lavender magazine described it as a "volume to keep close and savor".
