= Adam Nathaniel Furman =

British artist and designer (born 1982)

- Born: November 1982 (age 43–44); Paddington, London, England
- Education: Architectural Association
- Partner: Marco Ginex
- Website: adamnathanielfurman.com

Adam Nathaniel Furman (born November 1982) is a British architect, artist, and academic. Furman specialises in work characterised by bright colours, bold patterns and ornaments. He coined the term New London Fabulous.

== Early life ==
Furman was born at St Mary's Hospital in Paddington to an Argentine father and a German-Japanese mother, both Jewish, and raised in North London near Finchley Road. Furman attended Highgate School.

In 2001, Furman enrolled in a foundation course at Central Saint Martins. He went on to study at the Architectural Association (AA), graduating in 2008. This was followed by further graduate studies at the AA.

== Career ==
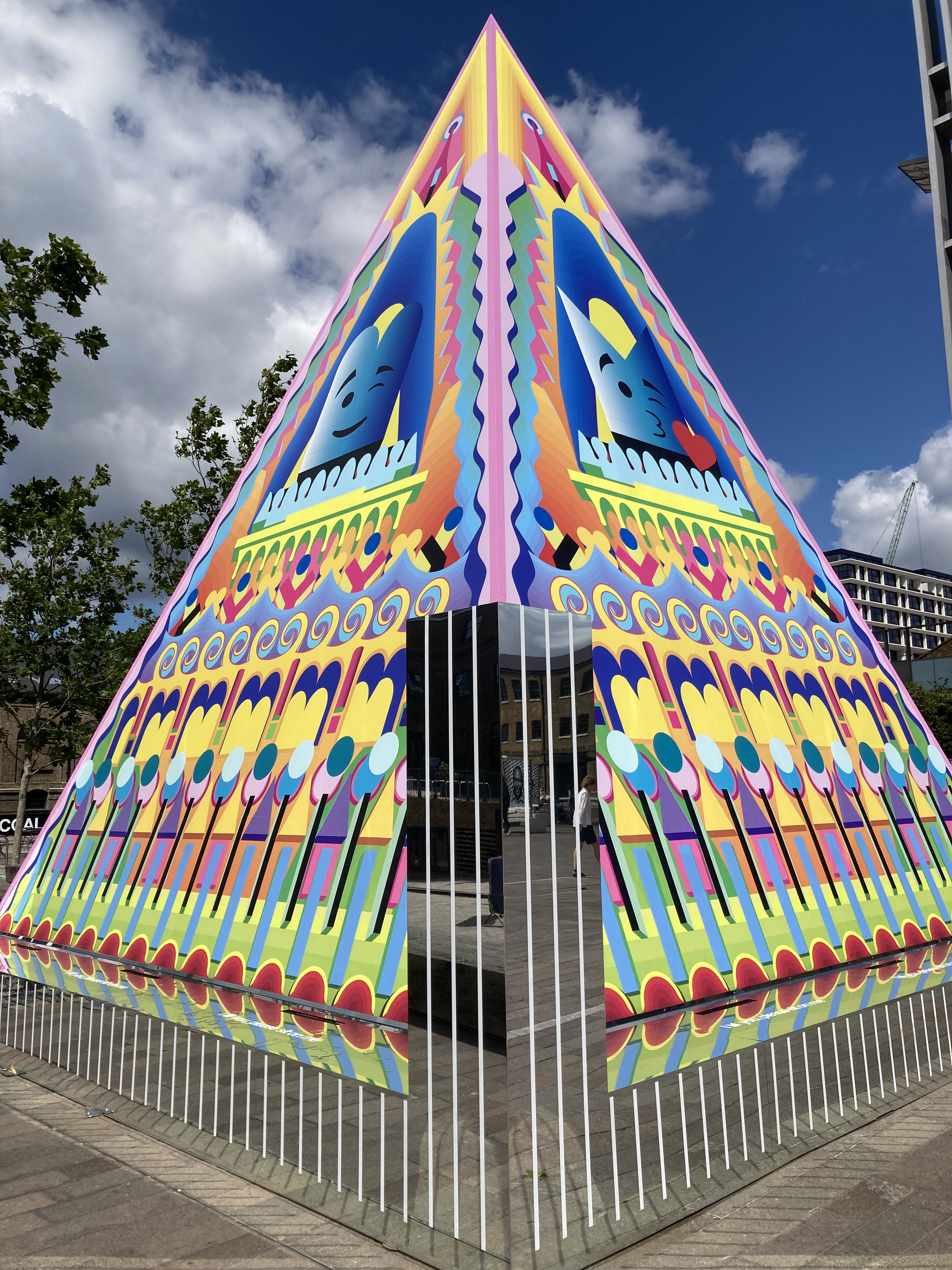
Proud Little Pyramid (2021)

Furman became co-director of the AA's research group Saturated Space and opened Madam Studio. In 2013, he was invited to join the Design Museum's Designers in Residence programme. In 2014 and 2015, Furman had a residency at the British Academy in Rome, where he was awarded the Rome Prize in Architecture. Furman's winning project The Roman Singularity was later displayed at the Soane Museum in 2017. He also returned to Central Saint Martins to teach and run the Productive Exuberance studio.

Named as one of the Architecture Foundations 'New Architects' in 2016, Furman was also named as a new talent by Metropolis, who described him as "a master of surface and ornamentation" who relies on their "own imagination rather than trends for inspiration". That year, Furman co-authored Revisiting Postmodernism with Terry Farrell, and was commissioned to design a futuristic town hall concept called Democratic Monument for Architecture Fringe.

Furman was named a 2019 FX Product Designer of the Year. In 2021, Furman had a sixth-month residency at King's Cross, where he installed the Proud Little Pyramid for Pride Month.

Furman co-edited the 2022 anthology Queer Spaces with Joshua Mardell, which includes pieces from contributors on domestic, communal, and public spaces where LGBT+ individuals have found safety and solidarity over the decades. As of 2023, Furman is in the process of creating a 57-meter-long mosaic mural titled A Thousand Streams on a wall outside London Bridge station with the London School of Mosaic, as well as ceramic tile colonnades for the new Enclave tower in Croydon.

== Artistry ==
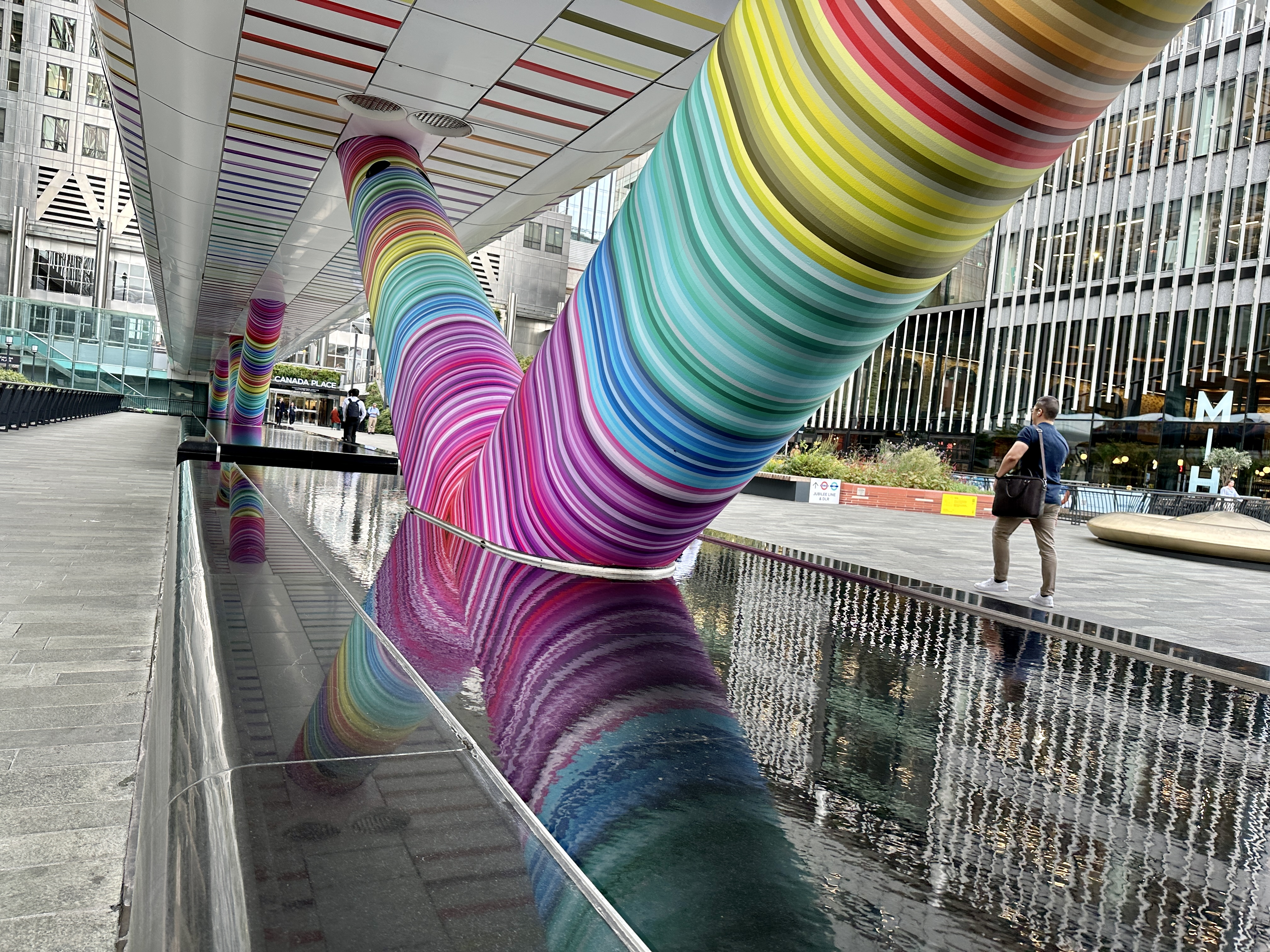
Click Your Heels Together Three Times by Adam Nathaniel Furman. Canary Wharf, London

At a young age, Furman was inspired by the tiles and mosaics they saw in London Underground stations, particularly Eduardo Paolozzi's mosaics in the old Tottenham Court Road station.

In an interview about Democratic Monument, Furman stated "In great contrast to the rest of our cultural output, our physical environment is crushingly uniform."

In 2020, Furman coined the term New London Fabulous (NLF) to refer to a group of London-based artists and designers who reject "monochromatic minimalism" in favour of "kaleidoscopic" colours, ornament, and geometry. NLF also places emphasis on creating public spaces that represent and celebrate the city's local communities and cultures. Notable NLF figures include Yinka Ilori, Camille Walala, and Morag Myerscough.

== Personal life ==
Furman lives in Belsize Park with their long-term partner Marco Ginex. He has dyslexia.

== Select works ==
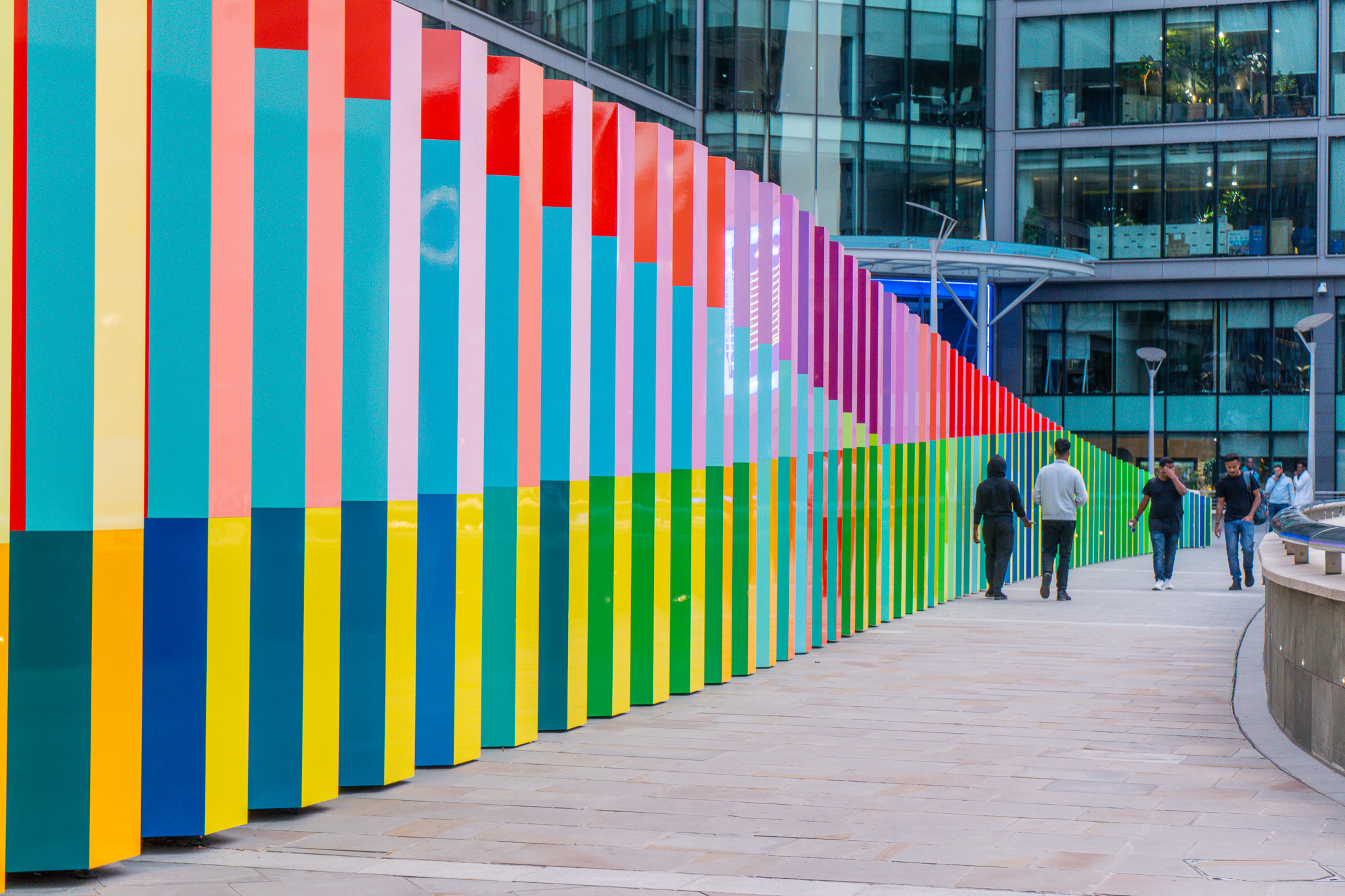
Abundance

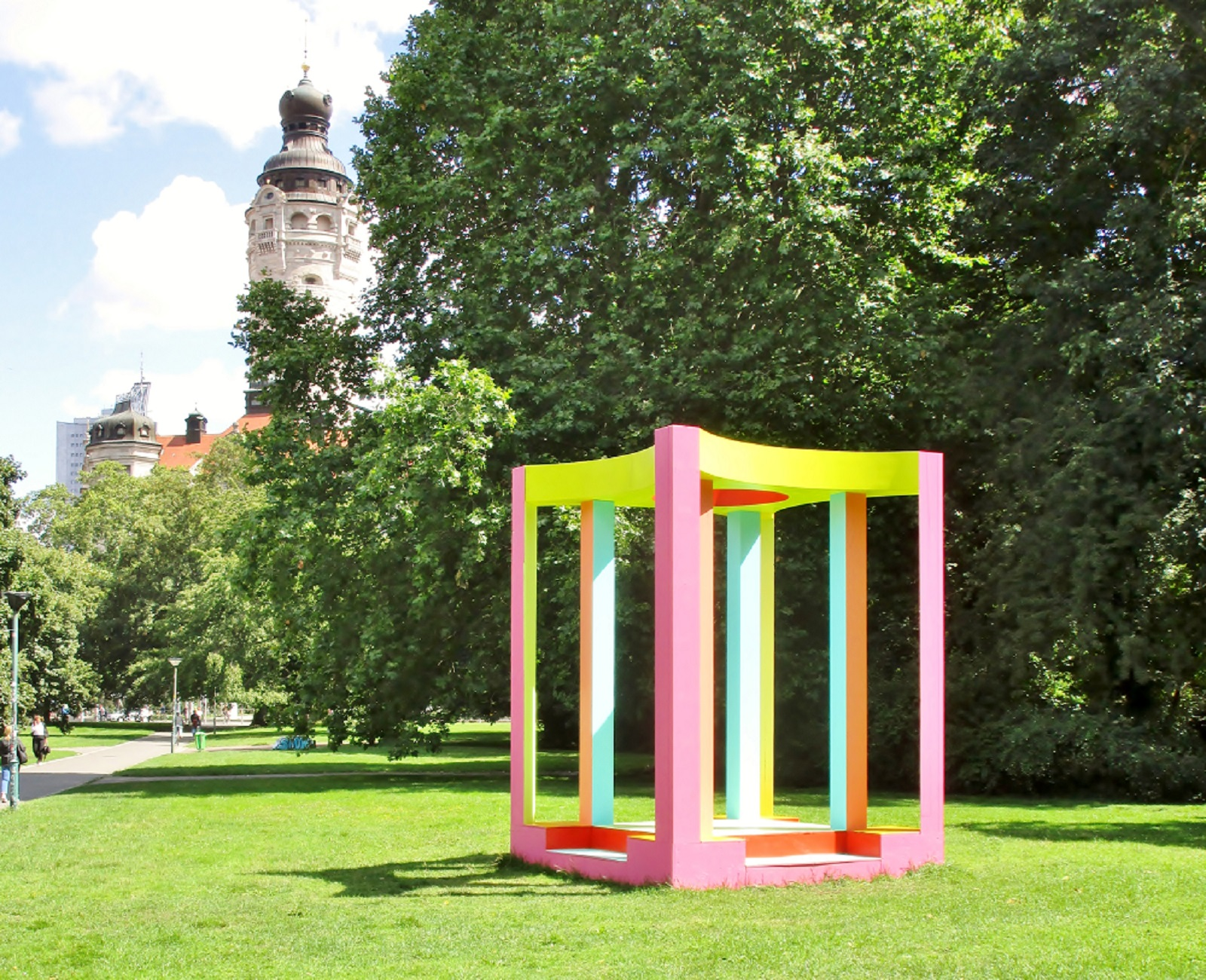
Cassata Pavilion

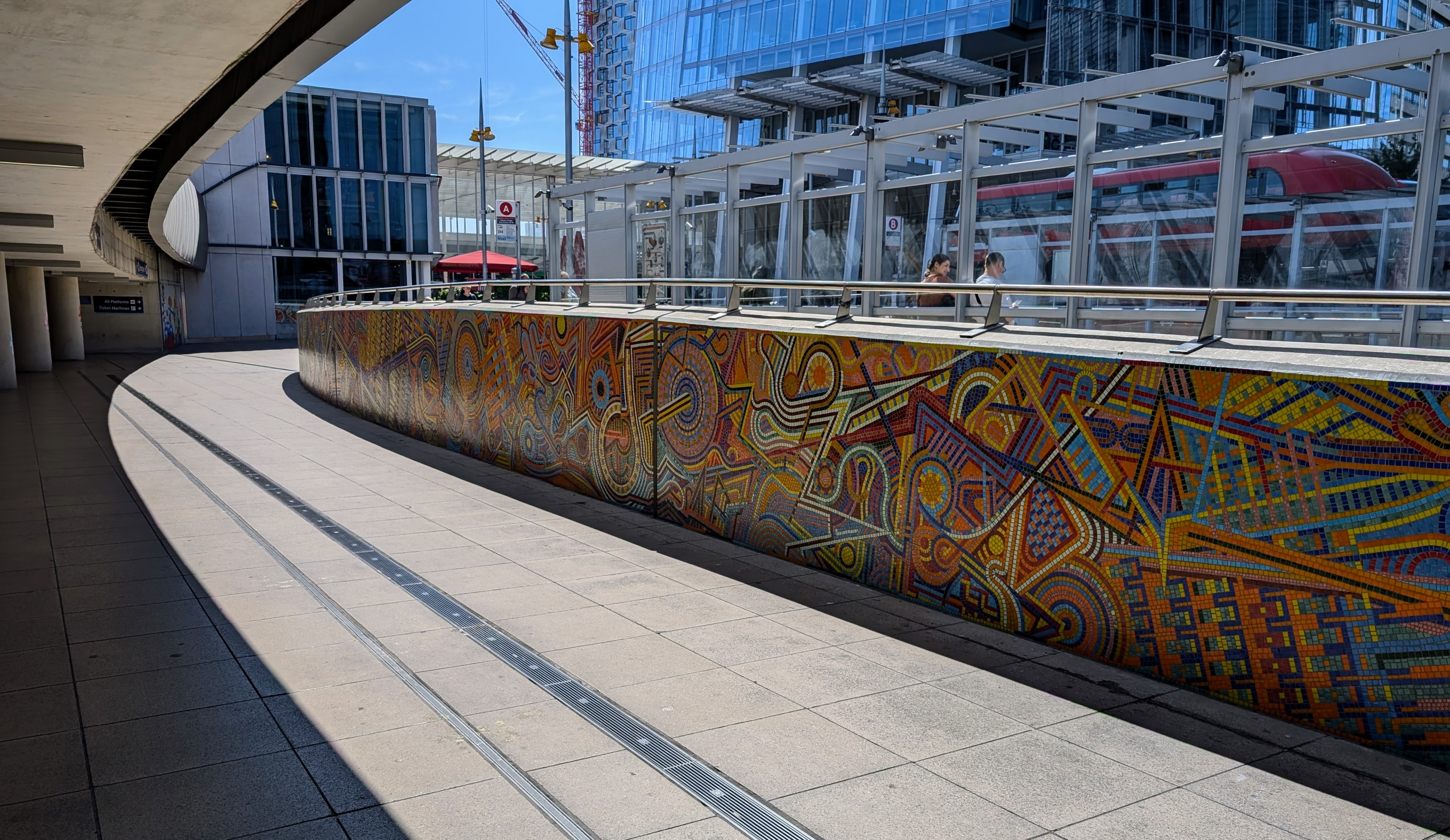
In a River a Thousand Streams

=== Public art and spaces ===
- The Roman Singularity (2014, 2017), ceramic sculptures made in Rome, later displayed at the Soane Museum
- Gateways (2017), installation in Granary Square
- Look Down to Look Up (2018), street crossing patterns for Croydon Council
- Pontoon and the Paddington Pyramid (2019), at Paddington Central
- Boudoir Babylon (2020), installation for the National Gallery of Victoria's Triennal
- Proud Little Pyramid (2021), installation at King's Cross for London Pride
- Abundance (2023), installation in Paddington, London
- Babs Baldachino (2023), monument for the Birmingham Fierce Festival
- Cassata Pavilion (2023), sculpture at the Plastikgarten in Leipzig
- Click Your Heels Together Three Times (2023), installation at Canary Wharf
- Bristol Quilt (2023), ceramic mural in Bristol city centre
- Croydon Colonnade (2023), mosaic pedestrian thoroughfare under residential building
- In a River a Thousand Streams (2024), mosaic mural at London Bridge station
- Livery Street Subway ceramic mural in Birmingham (2025)
- Forest of Delight (2025), installation at Umekita Plaza in Osaka
- Colourway (2026), overpass/underpass in Plumstead
- Rimon (2026), light installation at Citypoint Plaza

=== Collections ===
- Baalbak, Chess and Phoenician, porcelain and glassware for Beit Collective
- Beiruti, Lisa and Noor, weaved chairs for Beit Collective
- Capricciosa and Mediterranean, rugs for Floor Story
- Chomp and Lounge Hog!, laminated furniture for De Rosso
- Glowbules, glass lights for Curiousa
- MySplash, home items for Mirrl
- New Town, tiles for Bottega Nove
- Petalfall, ceramics with Hiroyuki Onuki
- Princex, ceramics for Nuoveforme

=== Other ===
- Sculptures for ITV animation
- Democratic Monument (2017), maximalist town hall concept for Architecture Fringe
- Architectural Icons (originally Postmodern Icons, 2022–), illustrations of famous buildings

== Bibliography ==
- Revisiting Postmodernism (2017) (co-author with Terry Farrell)
- Queer Spaces (2022) (co-editor with Joshua Mardell)
- Postmodernism: Architecture That Changed Our World (2024) (co-author with Terry Farrell)
- Chromatic Architecture: The Craft of Colour in Design (2026) (co-author with Kate Mazade)

== See also ==
- Yinka Ilori
- Yayoi Kusama
- Morag Myerscough
- Bethan Laura Wood
