= Arimatsu, Aichi =

Former town in Chita District, Aichi Prefecture

Arimatsu 有松町
- Town
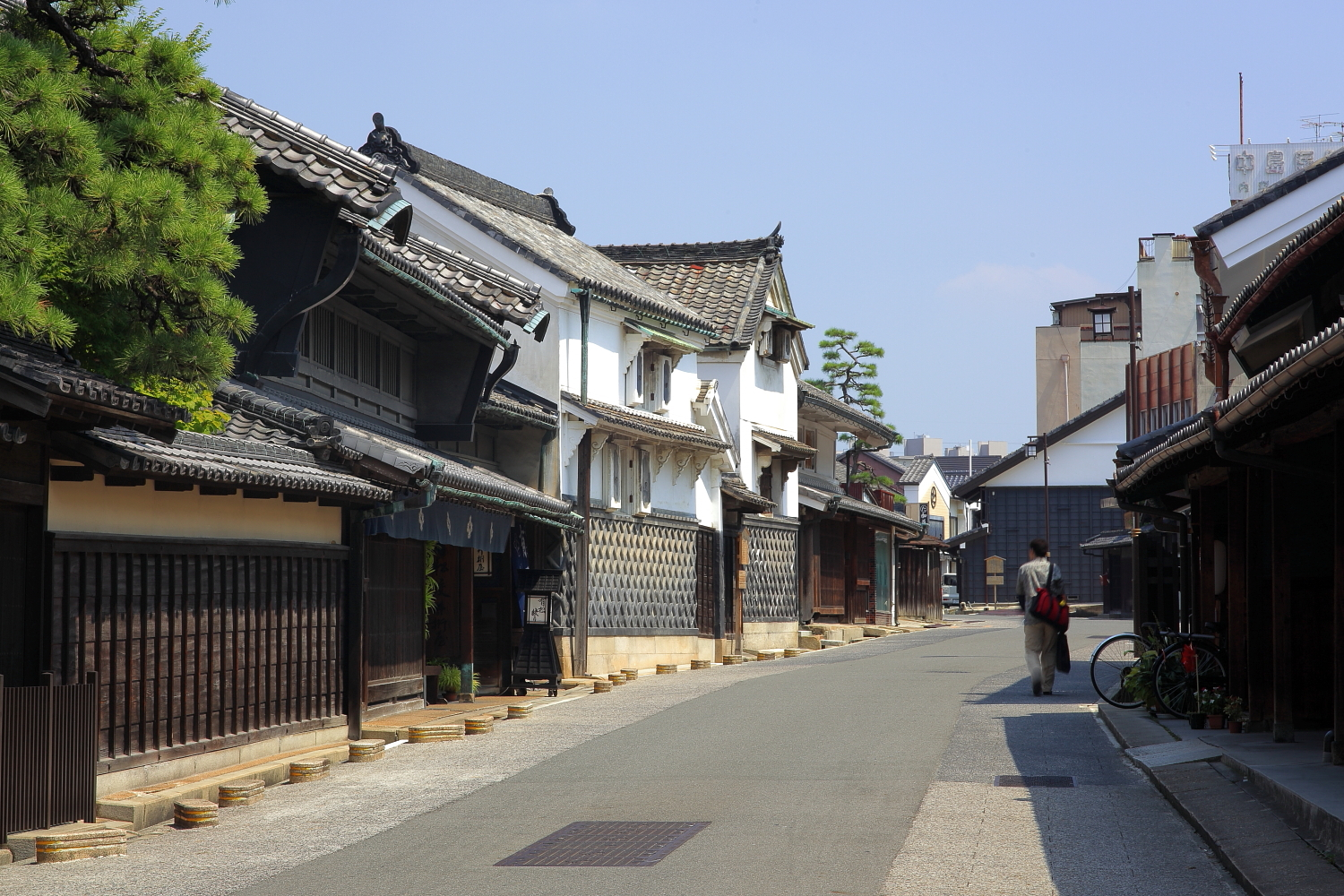
- Arimatsu historical quarter

- Location in Japan
- Coordinates: 35°04′00″N 136°58′00″E
- Country: Japan
- Region: Chūbu region Tōkai region
- Prefecture: Aichi

Area
  - Total: 2.98 km^{2} (1.15 sq mi)

Population (1960)
  - Total: 4,544
  - Density: 1,520/km^{2} (3,950/sq mi)
- Time zone: UTC+9 (Japan Standard Time)

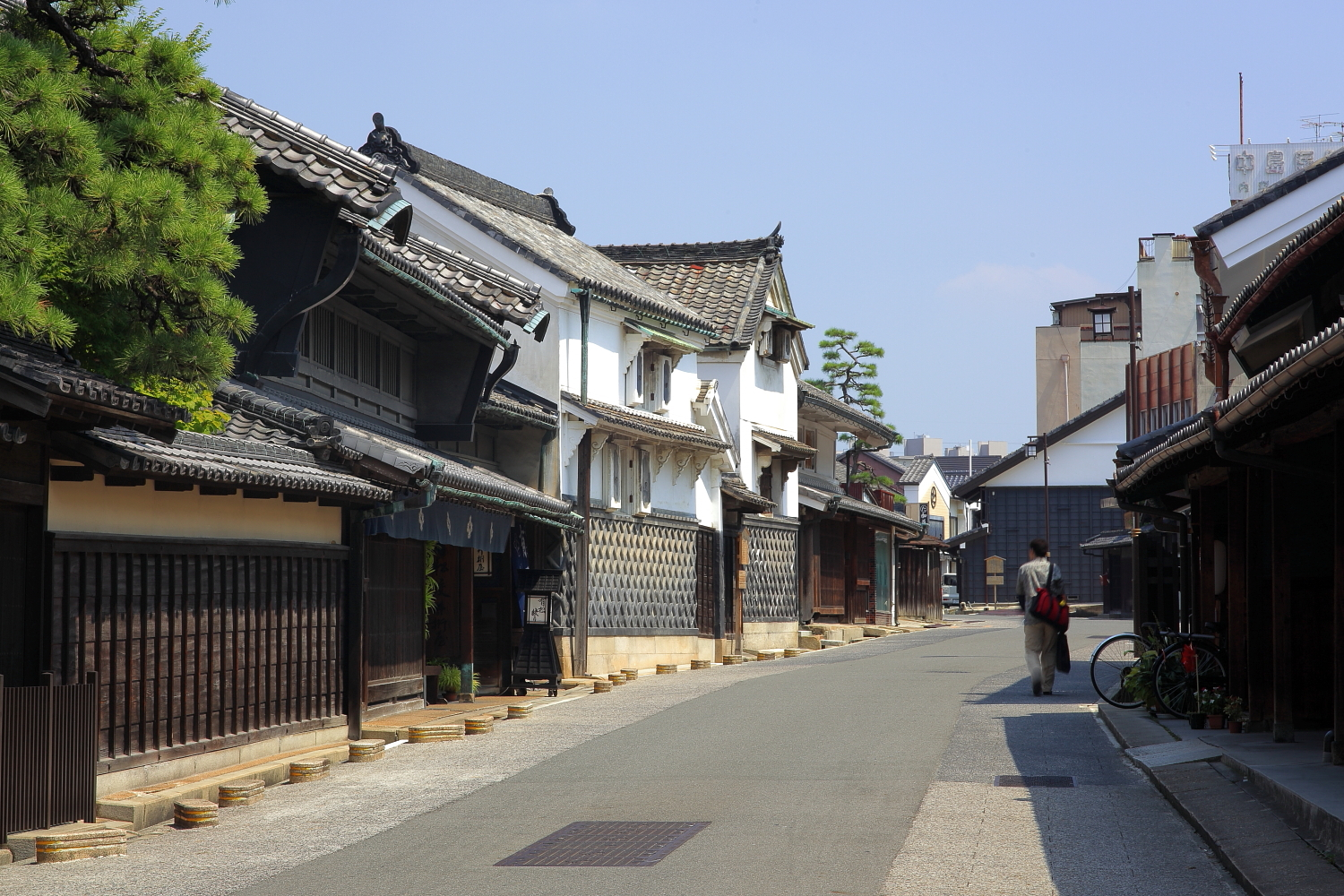
Historic quarter

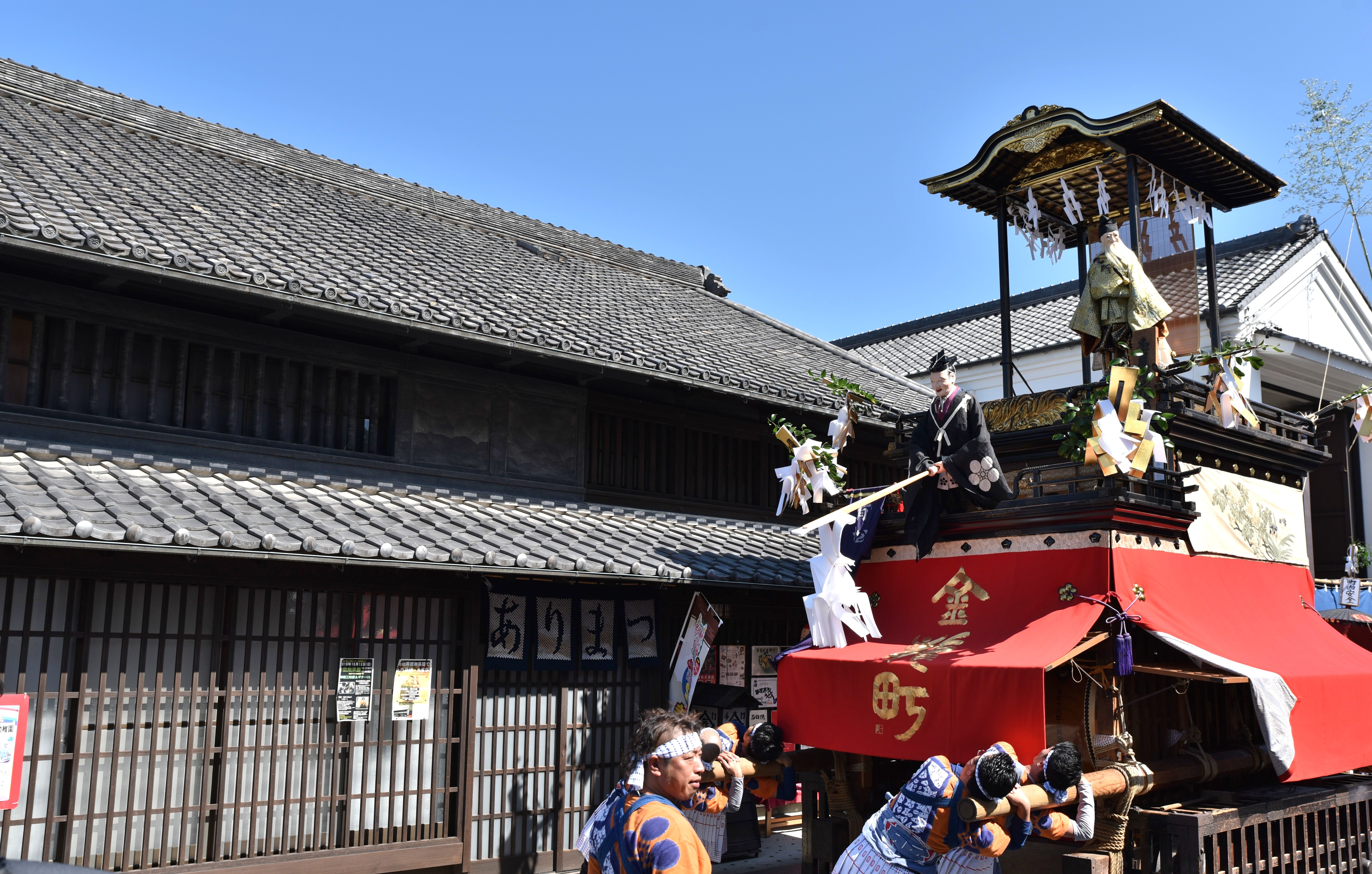
Arimatsu Autumn Festival

Arimatsu (有松町, Arimatsu-chō) is a town in Aichi Prefecture, Japan. It houses the Arimatsu Station of the Meitetsu-Nagoya Line, roughly 11 kilometres (11,000 m) southeast of downtown Nagoya. The town merged into Nagoya on 1 December 1964, and became a part of Midori-ku, Nagoya.

The town is known for being the location of the Battle of Okehazama in 1560, where Oda Nobunaga defeated Imagawa Yoshimoto and established himself as one of the front-running warlords in the Sengoku period. The town is also well-known for being the historical centre of shibori, or traditional Japanese tie-dye, and has supported the industry since the 17th century, dating back to 1608.

== History ==
The area used to be inhabited before 1608. In 1608, the Owari Domain which was developing the Tōkaidō asked residents of Chita Peninsula to move to the area, creating the village. When the village was first created, it was technically a part of Okehazama village, but it became independent in 1625. The entire village was burned by fire in 1784.

In 1892, Arimatsu was elevated to town status, and also merged with Okehazama village which was annexed by Kyowa Village in 1893.
