= Visual metaphor =

Pictorial analogy

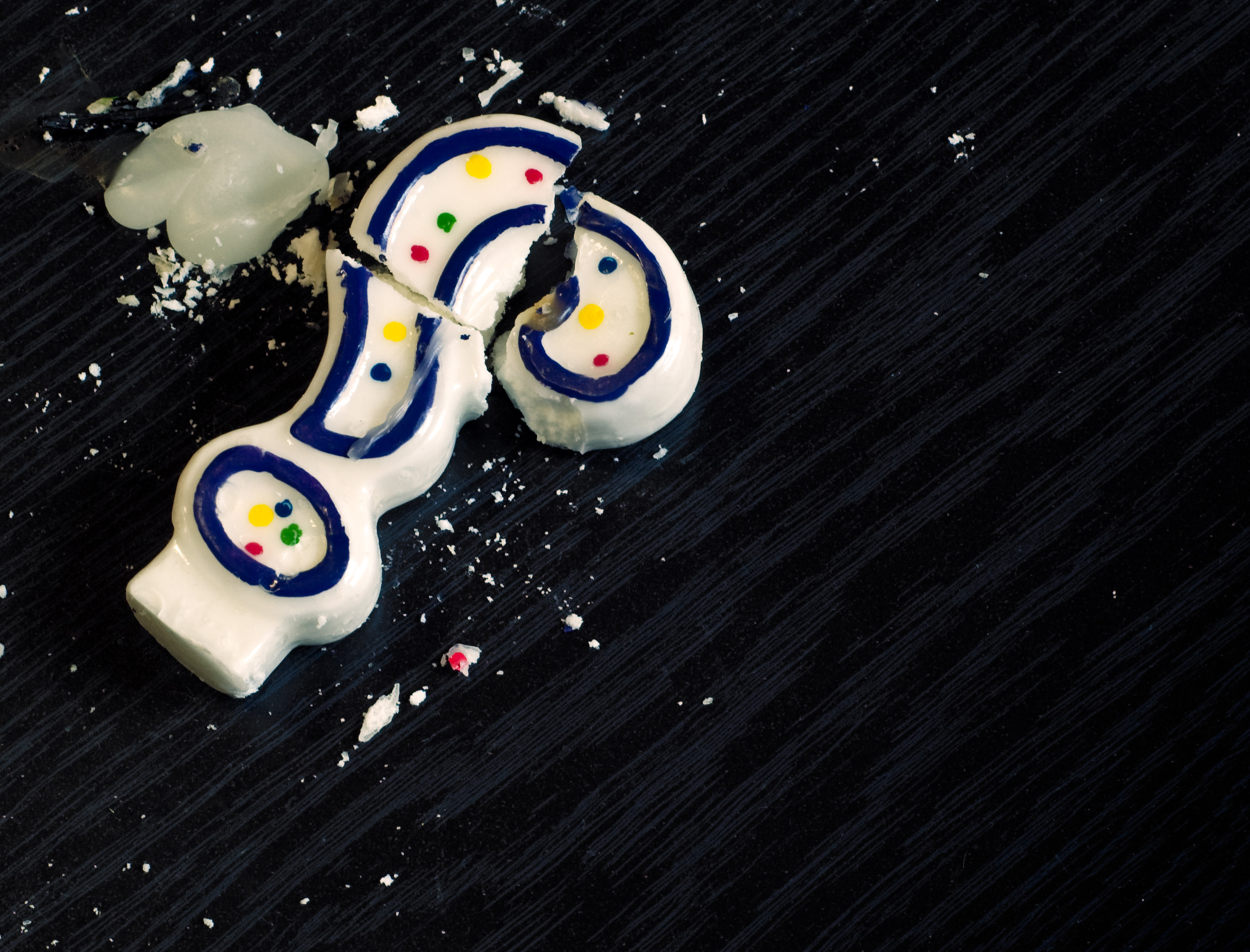
The photo appears to be of a broken question mark birthday candle faced the other direction on a dark surface. This could be a visual metaphor for questioning life.

A visual metaphor is a metaphor the medium of which is visual. Like in any other metaphor, one part of it, usually named "source", applies to another part, usually named "target", and reconstructs it. The point is that the metaphorical application or reconstruction in visual metaphor is made by means of visual tools, forms and compositions. Shimon Levi's and Arieh Cohen Ship Building (known also as Boat House) is an example of visual metaphor: its source is a ship, its target is a building, and the building is ship shaped. The visual metaphors philosopher Michalle Gal defines metaphor as made of three parts: source, target, and emergent properties which are gained by the combination of the source and target in a new composition, and reconstructs the target anew. According to Gal, and contrary to theories of conceptual metaphor, emergent properties cannot be pre-conceptualized and can be possessed only by the specific metaphor: a ship made of cement applies only to the Ship Building. Gal claims that the emergence is gained thanks to the power of compositions, that supply a context to the elements of metaphor that proffers significance thanks to their organization, mutual relations and influences. For Gal, since the power of metaphorical composition is best embodied by the visual media, visual metaphors are the paradigmatic metaphors and every kind of metaphors, conceptual or linguistic, are based on visuality.

There are claims that visual metaphor is pictorial analogy. It illustrates a comparison between what is in the visual, including its connotations and denotations with another thing and its meanings figuratively. For some visual metaphors the link between the images and what they are being compared to is the physical similarity while others it is the conceptual similarity. There are similar interpretations of the visual metaphors but each person can comprehend them a bit differently. There are different types which include: spatial and stylistic. They are also commonly used in advertising because of its ability to persuade.

== Types ==
Visual metaphors are a type of metaphor. There are two types: spatial metaphors and stylistic metaphors. Spatial visual metaphors include where objects are located, their size, whether they are abstract or realistic, and how it is arranged in respect to other objects. Stylistic visual metaphors are more about how they look specifically. For example, its color, how detailed it is, or its size.

There are three types of visual metaphor that are also seen often. There is juxtaposition, fusion, and replacement. These three types of visual metaphor all differ from each other, and are all complex in their own, specific ways. These levels of complexity are based on how difficult it is for viewers to come to a conclusion on that specific visual metaphor.

In juxtaposition metaphors, both the actual product image and the metaphorical image are incorporated within the advertisement. In replacement advertisements, there is only one image shown instead of both. Because only one image is shown in replacement advertisements, the image shown is in place of the image missing as well.

"Metaphors are inherently open-ended, and can produce both strong and weak implicatures, the latter of which are alternate readings of the main message that are nevertheless called up in the mind of the interpreter"

== Rhetorical uses ==
One reason visual metaphors are common in advertising is because they have the ability to persuade. Visual metaphors can be used as a rhetorical device. When the audience sees a visual that they attribute positive or negative emotions with to the company's product or service they may make that connection and feel similarly about that product or service.

== Advertising uses ==
There are examples of visual metaphors in the advertising industry. The visuals presented in an ad may have scripts that say a specific thing, but the visuals have their own meaning besides what it would mean literally. For example, say a company is selling a particular product, when they show images in a TV or poster advertisement that is not their product, they are saying in a way the product is like the image shown.

Visual Metaphor is often seen within advertisements. Because visual metaphor is used to persuade, advertisements utilize visual metaphor to intrigue consumers. In some cases, the visual metaphor has a clear and concise message, and other times it is much more complex and hard to break down. Visual metaphors are one of the most common rhetorical devices used in advertising.
