= Yinka Ilori =

British artist and designer (born 1987)

Yinka Ilori MBE RDI
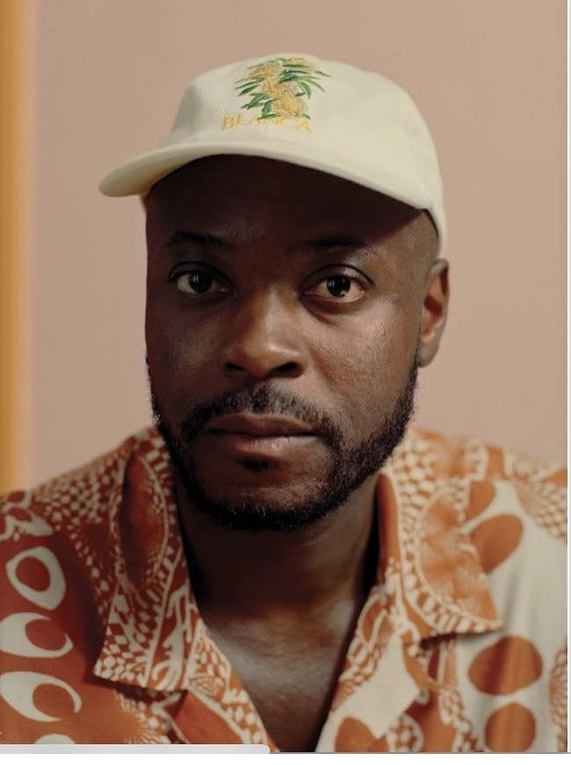
- Ilori in 2021
- Born: April 1987 (age 38–39); London, England
- Education: St Jude and St Paul's CoE Primary School; London Metropolitan University
- Occupations: Artist; Designer
- Honours: Member of the British Empire; Royal Designer for Industry; Honorary Doctorate (UCA); Emerging Design Medal
- Website: Official website

Olay Yinka Ilori (born April 1987) is a British-Nigerian artist and designer known for his playful design language and the bold use of bright colours. His work includes architecture, public spaces and sculptural installations, interior design, graphic design, homewares, textiles, fashion, and furniture. He is a storyteller who uses design as a medium, often referencing his British and Nigerian heritage. The New York Times Style Magazine described Ilori as "one of '12 Talents Shaping the Design World'", and Abitare referred to him as belonging "to a more open-minded and inclusive generation that sees design as offering a possible response to social and environmental changes."

== Early life and education ==
Ilori grew up in a multicultural neighbourhood on Essex Road in Islington and attended St Jude and St Paul's Church of England Primary School.

His father was a store manager for B&Q and his mother worked as an events caterer. Ilori recalls the vibrant outfits worn by his parents' friends and family at house parties when he was little. Visiting Nigeria as a child had an important impact on him and helped him better understand his family's cultural heritage.

Ilori studied art and design (with a focus on furniture and product design) at London Metropolitan University from 2006 to 2009. He lives and works in London.

== Career ==
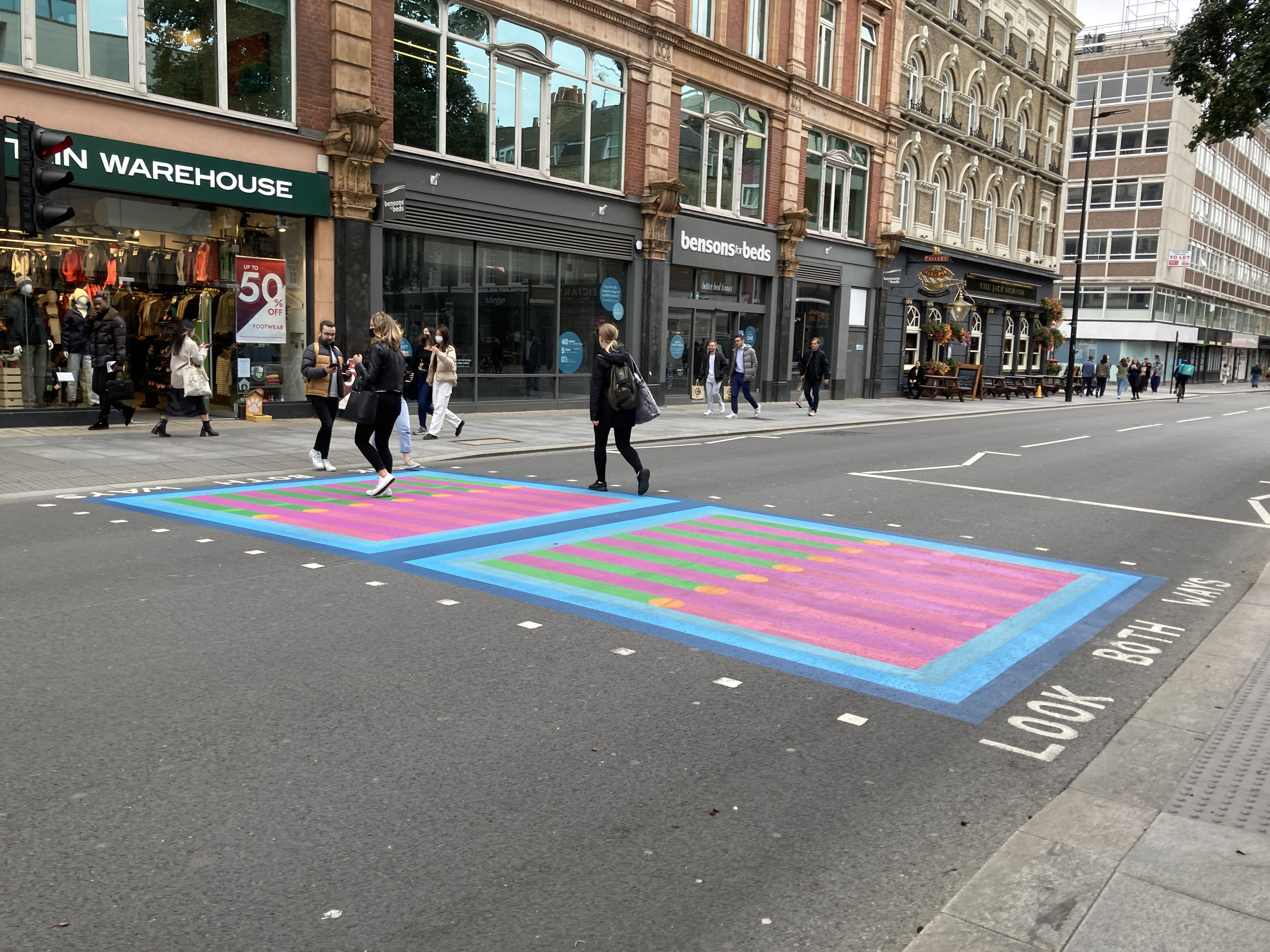
Bring London Together, Ilori's zebra crossing on Tottenham Court Road for the London Design Festival

After completing his degree, Ilori worked as an intern with furniture designer Lee Broom. His first solo work was supported by a £3,500 grant from The Prince's Trust. He began his professional practice in 2011, initially by upcycling second-hand furniture, and taking inspiration from the colour and design aesthetic of West African textiles. Early in his career, he worked at a Marks & Spencer store in Moorgate. The company later hired him to design products, including a recyclable carrier bag.

Ilori's mixed cultural heritage is an influence in his work. The Nigerian parables his parents told him as a child have become a major source of inspiration for his designs. In 2013, one such parable, "No matter how long the neck of a giraffe is, it still cannot see the future", led to a five-piece collection of chairs which Ilori transformed from broken and cast-off furniture into abstract, brightly coloured new works of art "to share a lesson from this childhood story — that we should not be judgemental".

More recently he has created public works and installations such as Happy Street, in which he transformed a railway bridge underpass at Nine Elms with brightly coloured murals; The Colour Palace at Dulwich Picture Gallery, a temporary pavilion described as "a testament to universal themes of [colour], pattern, and celebration"; and Get Up Stand Up at Somerset House, which "celebrates half a century of black creativity in the UK" and was called "a riot of colour and pattern".

Ilori founded his design studio in 2015. The practice includes architects and designers for whom colour is a key interest. As his team has expanded, Ilori has been able to take on larger-scale architectural and interior design projects. His clients include companies such as Adidas, Kvadrat, Lego, Meta, Nike, Pepsi, SCP, the VF Corporation, as well as the NHS Foundation Trust for which he created works for the Chelsea and Westminster Hospital, and Springfield University Hospital.

In 2020 he launched an eponymous homeware brand which manufactures and distributes his own products. He was also awarded the Emerging Design Medal by the London Design Festival.

Ilori collaborated with British stage designer Es Devlin on the design of the Britannia statuettes for the 2021 BRIT Awards.

In 2022 he designed a playground titled The Flamboyance of Flamingos in Parsloes Park, East London. In the same year, the Design Museum in London staged an exhibition of Ilori's work featuring 100 of his projects as well as "Canary Wharf's first ever basketball court." His work has also been exhibited in museums such as the V&A Dundee, Vitra Design Museum in Basel, and the Guggenheim Bilbao, and is held in the collection of the Metropolitan Museum in New York as part of the Afrofuturist Period Room.

Ilori has said, "I use colour as a way of starting a conversation. It's quite a nice way of opening up a topic and softening what could be a harsh reality", and is quoted in The Guardian as saying, "My work is very much about inclusivity and how people enjoy design."

According to the architect David Adjaye, Ilori's work "transcends just function and product and acts as a device for cultural memory".

Ilori was made a Member of the British Empire (MBE) for services to Design in the 2021 New Year's Honours.

In July 2024 Ilori was awarded an honorary doctorate by the University for the Creative Arts (UCA) "for his outstanding contributions to art and design."

In 2024 he launched a clothing line featuring his trademark vibrant patterns in collaboration with The North Face, The NSE collection (Never Stop Exploring) was described by the brand as its "most playful" to date and includes a range of items such as rain jackets, fleeces, sweatshirts, trousers, t-shirts, and a bag.

Ilori was appointed to the Royal Designers for Industry (RDI) by the Royal Society for Arts (RSA) in 2025.

== Gallery ==
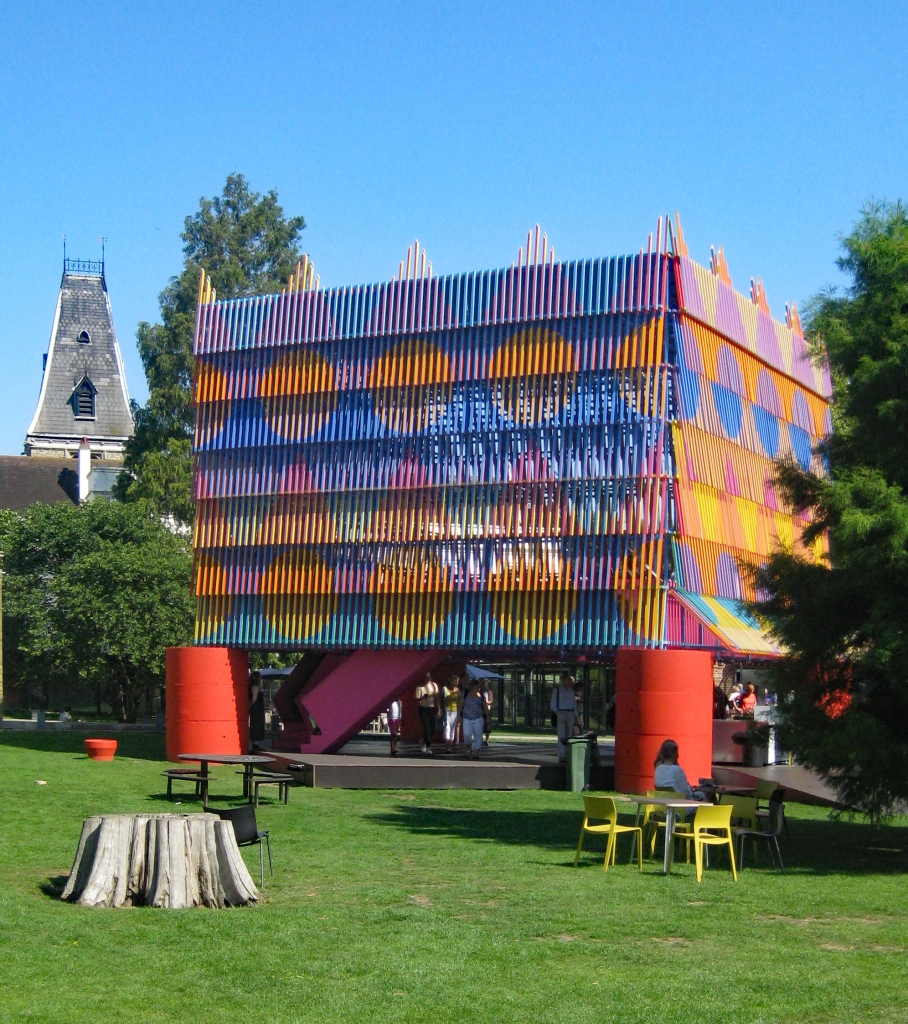
The Colour Palace, Dulwich Pavilion (with Pricegore architects)

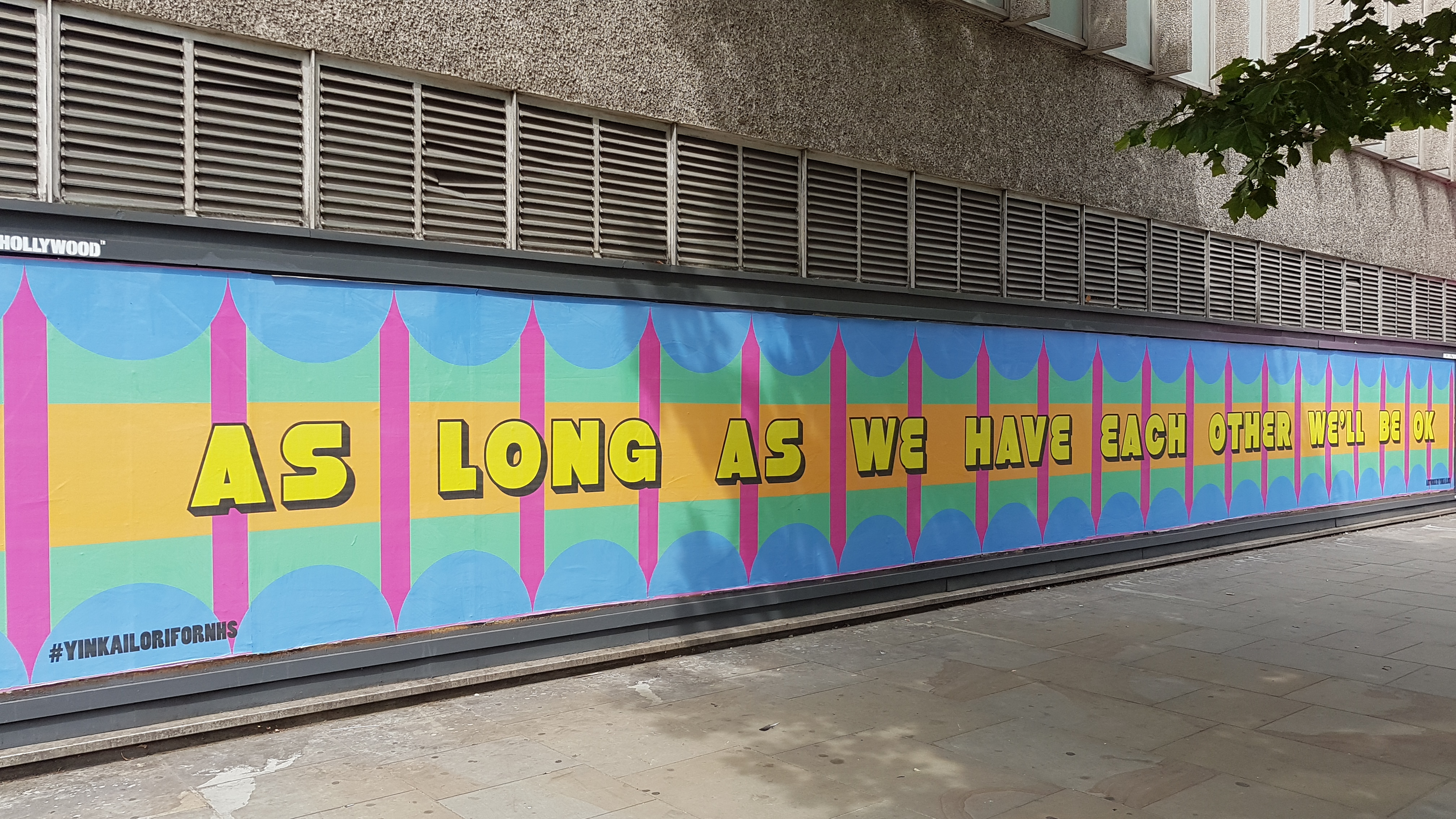
Blackfriars Road mural

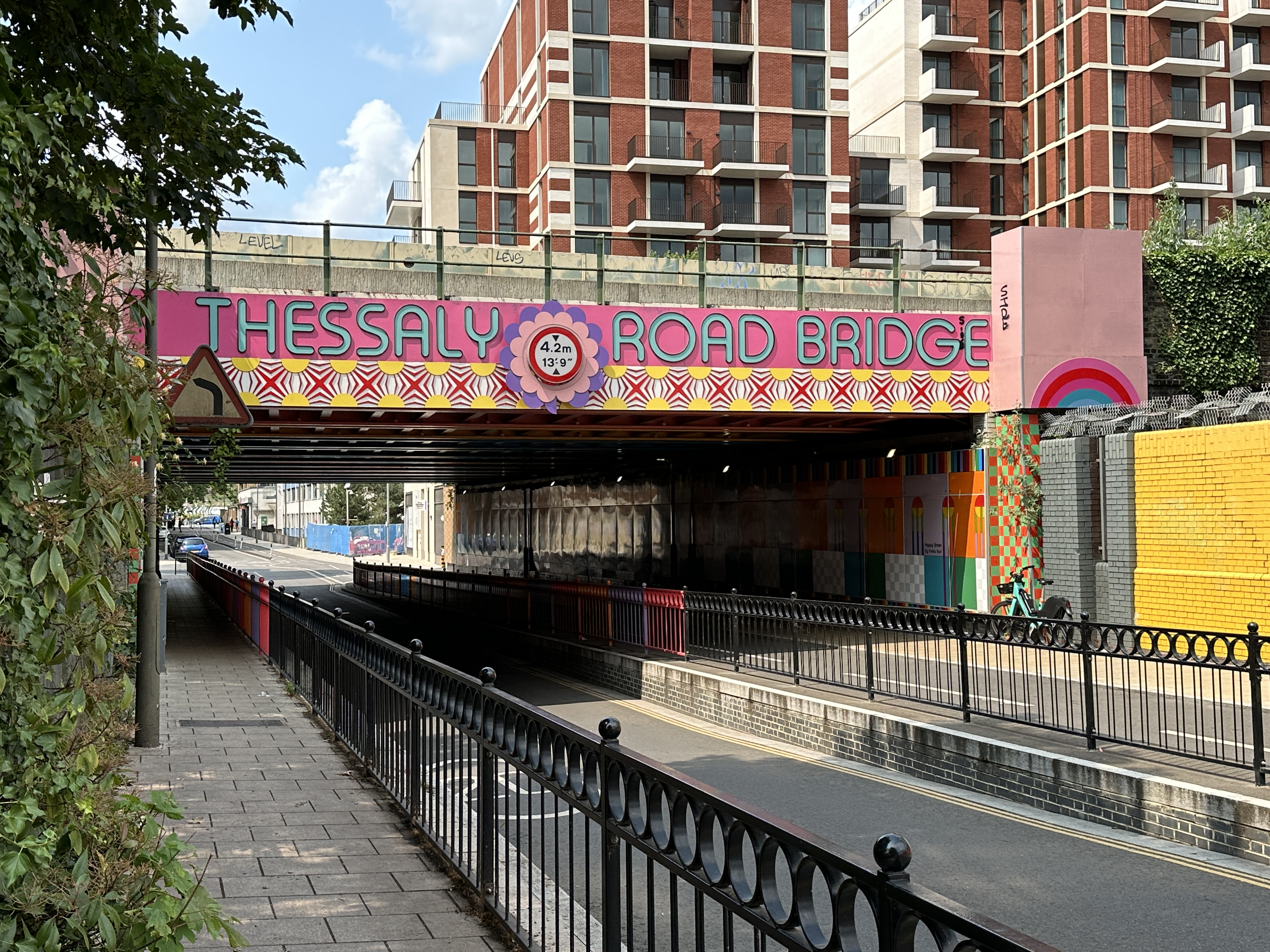
Happy Street, Thessaly Road bridge

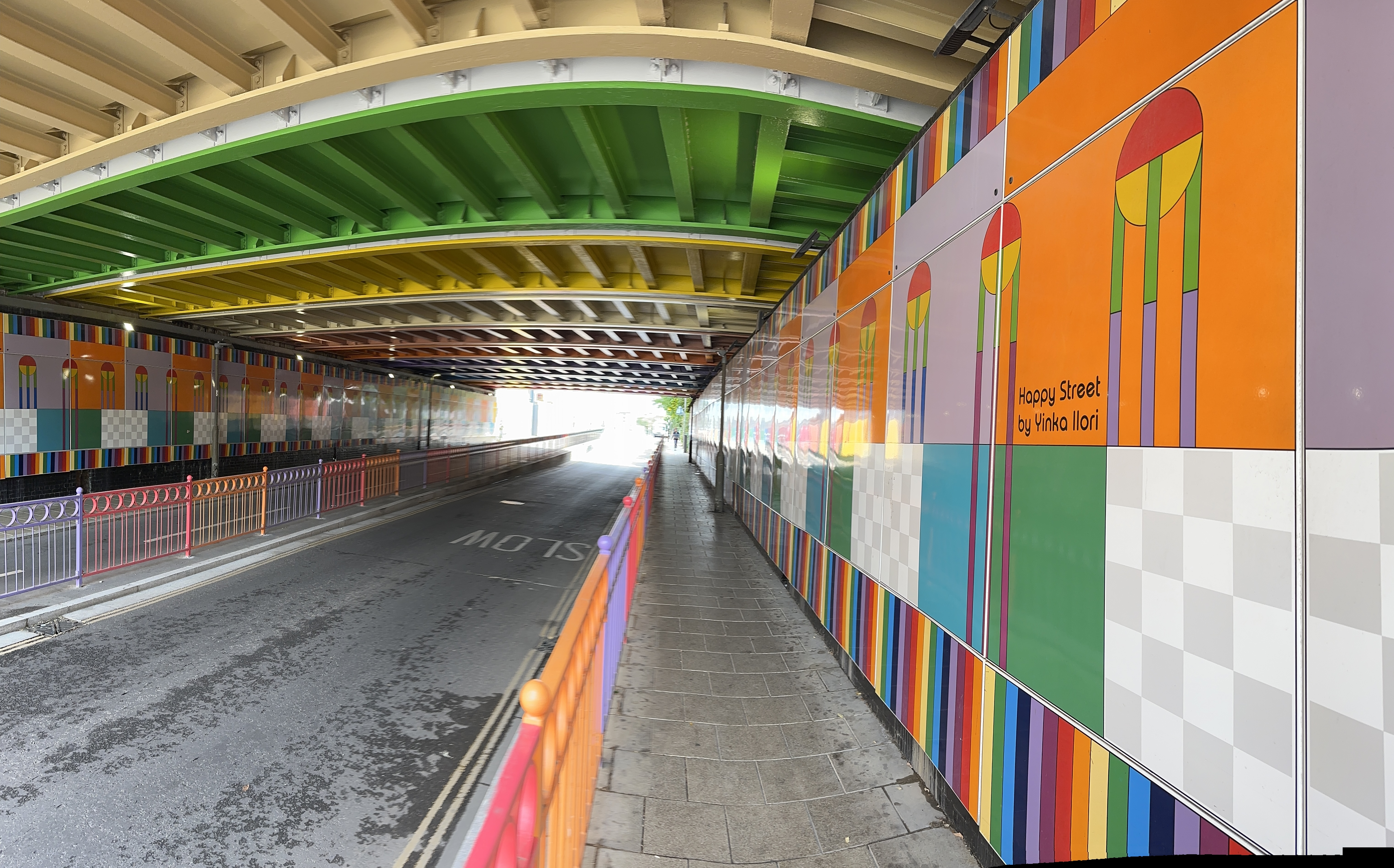
Happy Street (another view)

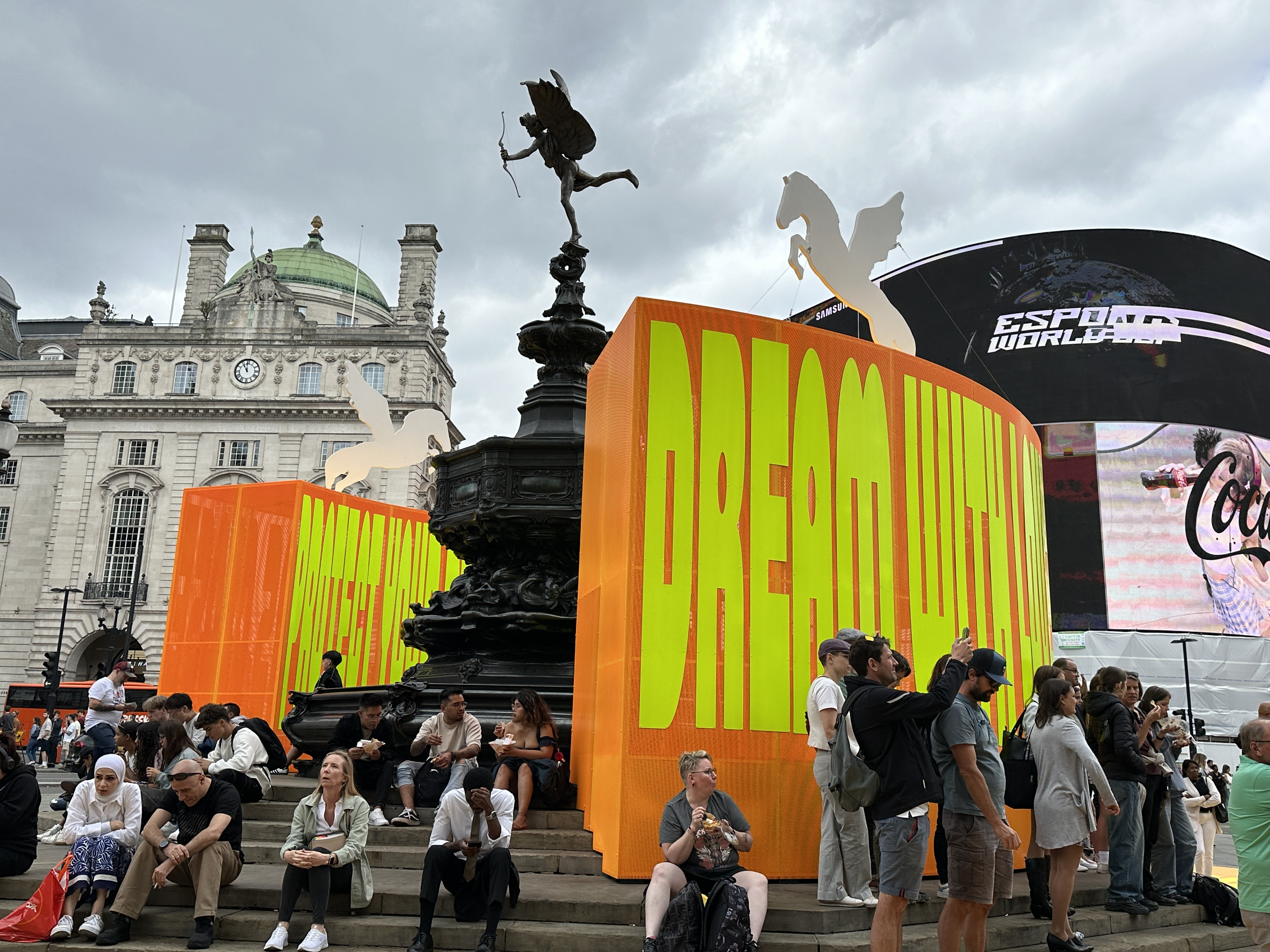
Keep Your Dreams Close in Piccadilly Circus, London

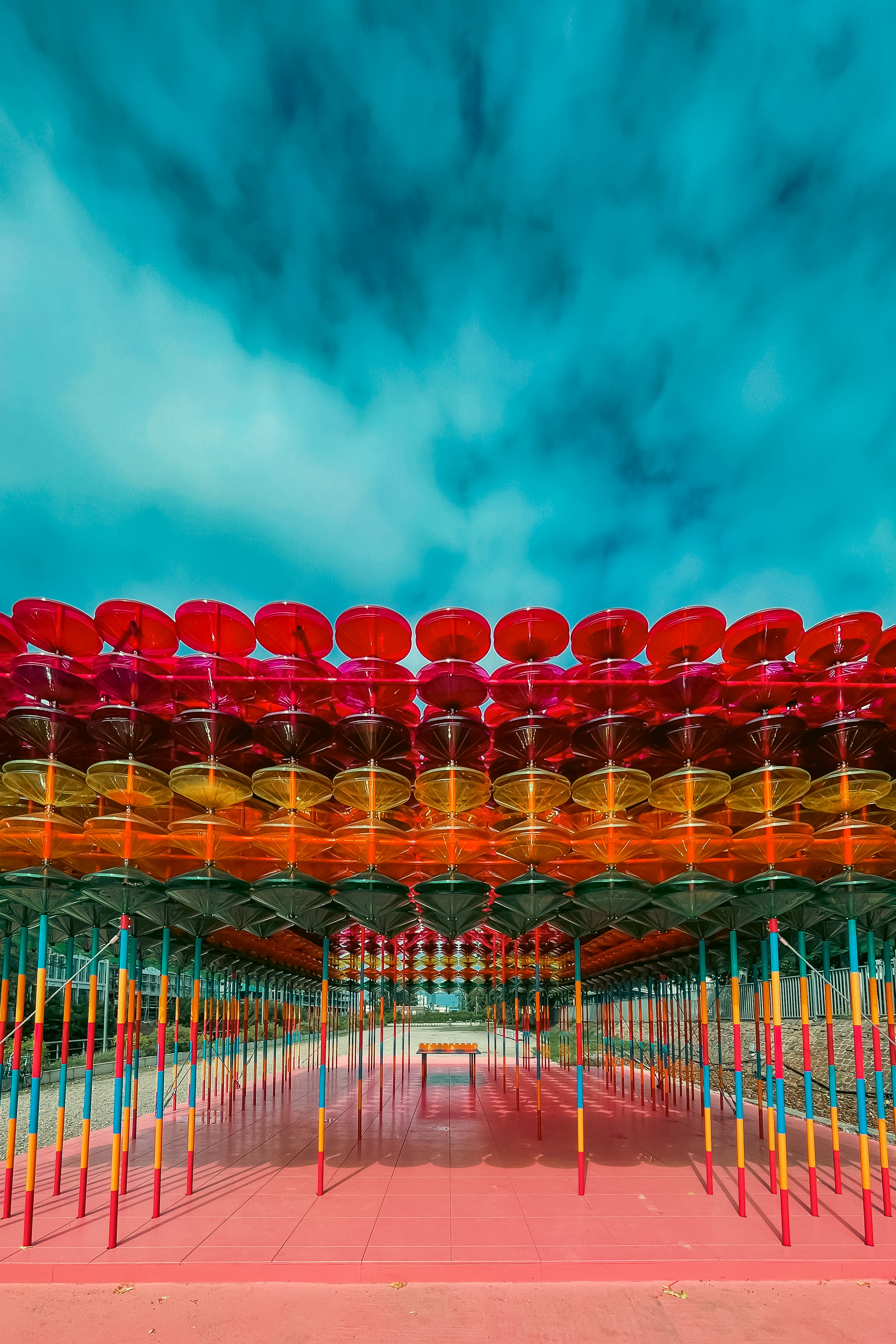
Filtered Rays by Ilori at Hotel Estrel, Berlin (2022)

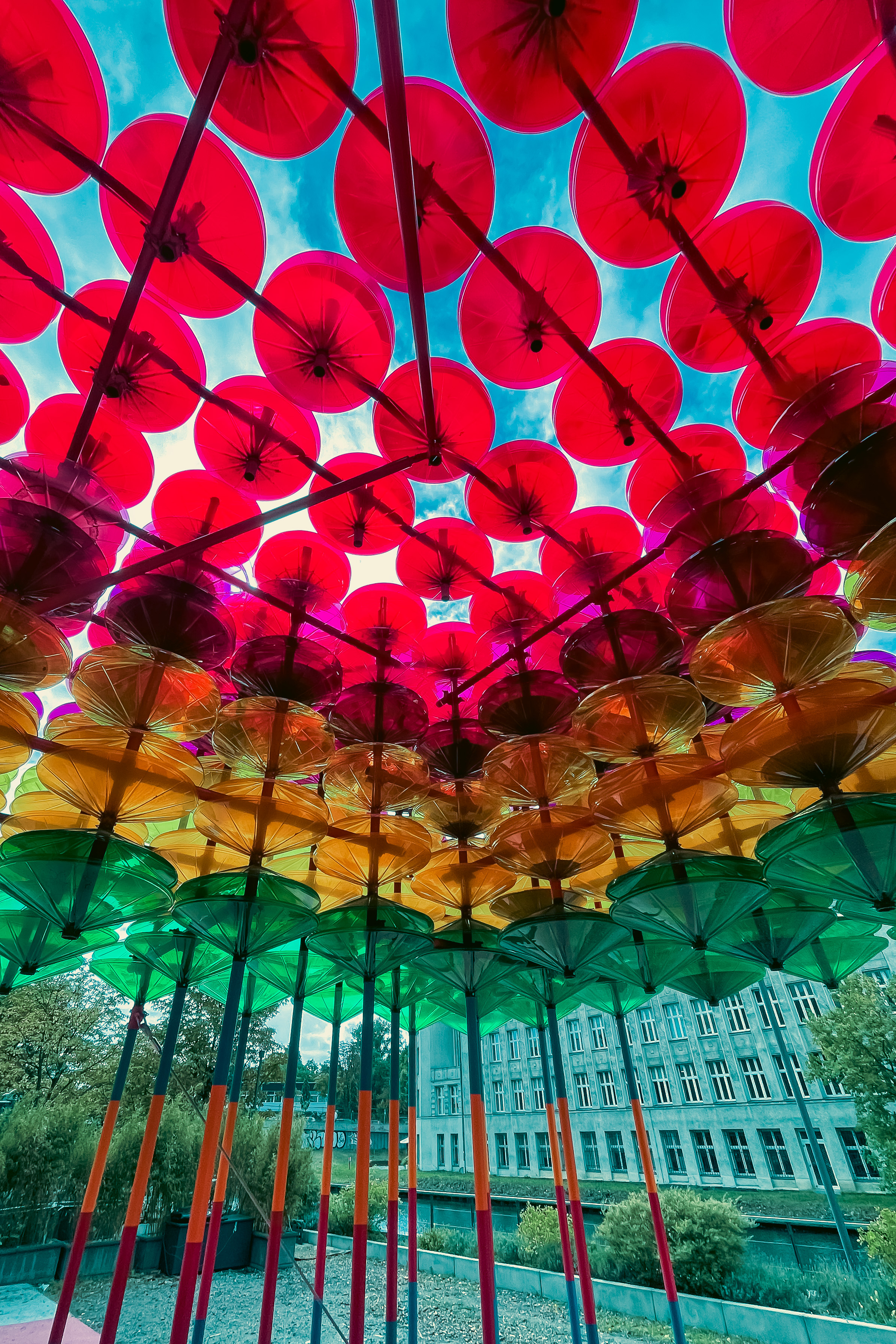
Filtered Rays (detail)

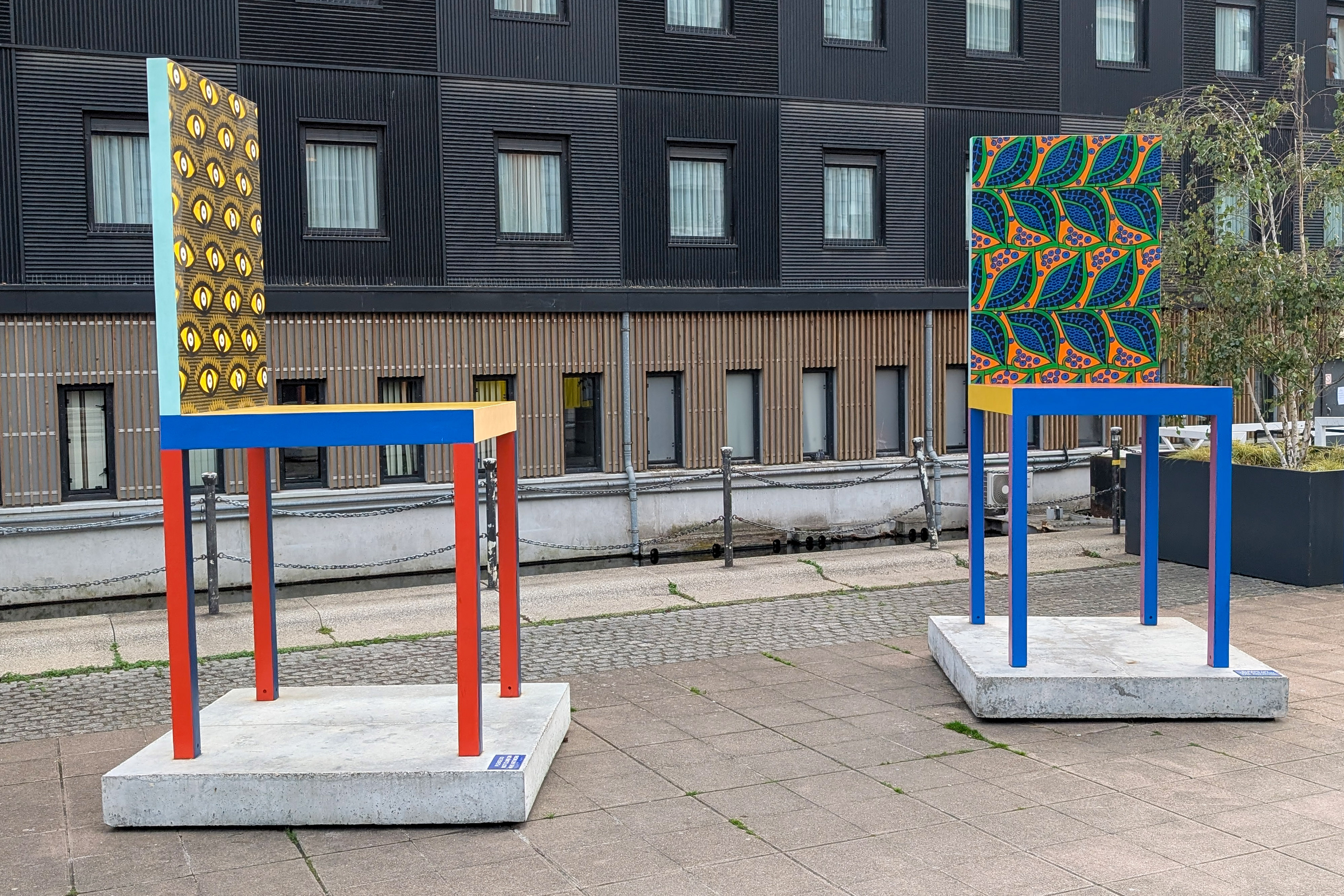
Types of Happiness Royal Docks, London

== Selected projects ==
- 2019 Colour Palace, Dulwich Picture Gallery, London, UK
- 2019 Happy Street, London Festival of Architecture and Wandsworth Council, UK
- 2020 Colorama skate park, La Condition Publique cultural centre, Lille, France
- 2021 Laundrette of Dreams, Lego Collaboration, London, UK
- 2021 Transparency in Shades of Colour, London, UK
- 2021 Bring London Together, UK
- 2021 The Sound of Movement, Labrum London, Spring-Summer 2022 show, UK
- 2021 Lick x Yinka Ilori Maximalist Brights, Wallpaper collection
- 2021 sonsbeek20→24 Sonsbeek, Arnhem, Netherlands
- 2021 Dodge, Somerset House, London, UK
- 2021 Promise me memories and I will let you in, Greenwich Peninsula, London, UK
- 2022 Layers of Movement, Meta, London, UK
- 2022 The Flamboyance of Flamingos, Parsloes Park Play Area, East London, UK
- 2022 Filtered Rays, Hotel Estrel, Berlin
- 2023 From Greener Pastures, Labrum London, Autumn–Winter 2023 show, UK
- 2023 Public Art Piece, The Rowe (Central House, former London Metropolitan University Cass School of Architecture), London, UK
- 2023 Types of Happiness, The Line art trail, London, UK
- 2024 Omi Okun, commission for Art on The Mart, Chicago, US
- 2024 Shaped to the Measure of the People’s Songs: Reflection in Numbers pavilion, HKW, Berlin, Germany
- 2024 Slices of Peace, Orchard Park, Kent, UK (with Peter Adjaye)
- 2025 100 Found Objects, Fulham Pier, London

== Exhibitions ==
=== Solo ===
- 2013 It Started With a Parable, Jaguar Shoes, London Design Week
- 2014 This is Where It Started, The Whitespace Gallery, Lagos
- 2015 If Chairs Could Talk, The Shop At Bluebird
- 2022 Yinka Ilori: Parables for Happiness, the Design Museum, London
- 2026 Joy Through Resistance: He Who Laughs Last, Laughs Best, Cristea Roberts Gallery, London

=== Group ===
- 2014 Africa Calling, Africa Utopia, Southbank Centre, London
- 2015 Home Affairs, NOW Gallery, London
- 2015 Making Africa, Vitra Design Museum, Basel. Guggenheim Museum Bilbao
- 2020 Knit!, Kvadrat, Copenhagen

== Publications ==
- Pricegore & Yinka Ilori: Dulwich Pavilion. Dingle Price, Alex Gore, Job Floris, Sumayya Vally, Yinka Ilori Studio, Pricegore. Zurich. 2021. ISBN 3-03860-233-7. OCLC 1224160677.
- Reynolds, Jason (2018). For every one. London. ISBN 978-1-9996425-3-2. OCLC 1063638673. (cover design by Yinka Ilori)
- Chairman. Oro Editions. 2026.
