= Penny Stamps Distinguished Speaker Series =

Lecture series at the University of Michigan School of Art & Design

Penny Stamps Speaker Series, University of Michigan
- Type: Public
- Established: 1999
- Parent institution: University of Michigan
- Director: Chrisstina Hamilton
- Location: Ann Arbor, Michigan, United States
- Website: pennystampsevents.org

The Penny Stamps Distinguished Speaker Series is a lecture series established by the University of Michigan School of Art & Design. With the support of Art and Design alumna Penny W. Stamps, the Penny Stamps Series presents visionary leaders who use their creative practice effectively. It celebrates those who transcend tradition and are progressive and influential with their work. Speakers are a range of emerging and established artists and designers from a broad spectrum of media, including painting, photography, architecture, sculpture and more.

Design professional, arts advocate, philanthropist, and friend Penny W. Stamps dedicated herself to elevating opportunities for the culture-makers of tomorrow. In 2012, the U-M Board of Regents named the School of Art & Design in her honor, creating the Penny W. Stamps School of Art & Design at the University of Michigan. The Stamps Gallery and Stamps Creative Work Awards are also named in her honor.

The Penny Stamps Series usually take place on Thursdays at 5:30 pm at the Michigan Theater, in downtown Ann Arbor. All lectures are free of charge and open to the public.

Most lectures are available via podcast on iTunes in both audio and video formats, as well as at the University of Michigan Stamps channel on YouTube.

== Witt Visiting Artists ==
The Roman J. Witt Residency Program, developed with the support of alumna Penny W. Stamps and named in honor of her father, is an annual international competition that awards one residency per academic year to a visiting artist/designer who proposes to develop a new work in collaboration with students and faculty. The residency provides an opportunity for the Stamps community to witness and take part in the artist's creative process, and is expected to culminate in the realization of the proposed work, as well as a presentation that summarizes the process and work accomplished.

2021 Roman J. Witt Artist in Residence Program Update Due to pandemic-related disruptions, all activities for the 2021 Roman J. Witt Artist in Residency program are postponed until 2022. Artist Tracey Snelling was originally named the 2021 Witt Artist in Residence; her residency will now take place in 2022. There will not be an application process for the 2022 Roman J. Witt Artist in Residence Program. Details about the 2023 program will be announced in November 2021.

== Stamps Speakers ==
Stamps Speakers
Year	Season	Date	Speaker(s)	Practice
2020	Fall	2020-12-04	Amy Cutler	Contemporary Artist
2020	Fall	2020-11-20	Raqs Media Collective	Art Collective
2020	Fall	2020-11-13	Kelly Murdoch-Kitt	User Experience Designer
2020	Fall	2020-11-06	Temple Grandin	Doctor of Animal Science and Author
2020	Fall	2020-10-30	Nusrat Durrani	Filmmaker
2020	Fall	2020-10-23	Ibrahim Mahama	Artist
2020	Fall	2020-10-16	Philippa Hughes	Social Sculptor and Creative Strategist
2020	Fall	2020-10-09	Form&Seek	Art Collective
2020	Fall	2020-10-02	Ken Burns & Isabel Wilkerson	Filmmaker and Author
2020	Fall	2020-09-25	Kate Stone	Creative Designer
2020	Fall	2020-09-18	New Red Order	Art Collective
2020	Winter	2020-04-09	Njideka Akunyili Crosby	Visual Artist
2020	Winter	2020-04-12	Gluklya	Visual and Performance Artist
2020	Winter	2020-04-01	Abigail DeVille	Sculptor and Artist
2020	Winter	2020-03-26	Martha Colburn	Filmmaker, Artist and Animator
2020	Winter	2020-03-19	Shaka Senghor	Author
2020	Winter	2020-03-12	Alex Dehgan	CEO and co-founder of Conservation X Labs
2020	Winter	2020-02-20	David Lang	Composer
2020	Winter	2020-02-17	Courtney McClellan	Artist and Writer
2020	Winter	2020-02-06	Angela Washko	Artist, Writer and Facilitator
2020	Winter	2020-02-04	Jim Jarmusch & Carter Logan as SQÜRL	Filmmaker of Stranger Than Paradise, Down by Law, and Mystery Train & Multi-Instrumentalist
2020	Winter	2020-01-30	Bridget McCormack & Len Niehoff & John de Lancie	Michigan Supreme Court Chief Justice & Legal Scholar and Practitioner & Actor
2020	Winter	2020-01-23	Cullen Washington Jr.	Painter
2020	Winter	2020-01-16	Oskar Eustis	Artistic Director of The Public Theater and Producer of Fun Home and Hamilton and Hamilton and Sweat
2019	Fall	2019-11-21	Edel Rodriguez	Artist
2019	Fall	2019-11-14	Suzanne Lacy	Artist
2019	Fall	2019-11-11	Artur Żmijewski	Multi-Media Artist, Curator and Critic
2019	Fall	2019-11-07	Marina Willer	Graphic Designer and Filmmaker
2019	Fall	2019-11-01	John Cameron Mitchell	Actor, Playwright, Screenwriter and Director of Hedwig and the Angry Inch
2019	Fall	2019-10-31	Joe Caslin	Illustrator and Street Artist
2019	Fall	2019-10-24	Marilyn Minter	Photorealistic Painter
2019	Fall	2019-10-17	Lauren Bon	Environmental Artist
2019	Fall	2019-10-10	Mari Katayama	Artist
2019	Fall	2019-10-08	Lucy Lippard & Faith Wilding	curator, feminist, activist & multidisciplinary artist
2019	Fall	2019-10-03	Stephen Jones	Fashion Designer
2019	Fall	2019-09-26	Ibrahim Mahama	Artist
2019	Fall	2019-09-21	Meleko Mokgosi	Artist
2019	Fall	2019-09-19	Vinay Gupta	Engineer, Strategist, Digital Visionary and Future Builder
2019	Fall	2019-09-12	Niel Harbisson & Moon Ribas	Artists and Cyborg Activist
2019	Winter	2019-04-04	Sarah Vowell	Editor of This American Life and Author of Lafayette in the Somewhat United States.
2019	Winter	2019-03-28	Meow Wolf	Art Collective for DIY Artists
2019	Winter	2019-03-21	Peter Sellars	American Theater Director
2019	Winter	2019-03-14	Mapplethorpe	Photographer
2019	Winter	2019-02-25	David Adjaye	Architect
2019	Winter	2019-02-21	Clyde Peterson	Film, Animation, Music, Installation, and Spectacle Artist
2019	Winter	2019-02-14	Carrie Mae Weems	Artist
2019	Winter	2019-02-24	Juliana Huxtable	Artist, Writer, Performer and Musician
2019	Winter	2019-01-24	Marisa Moran Jahn	Artist, Filmmaker and Writer
2019	Winter	2019-01-23	JuYeon Kim	Multimedia Artist
2019	Winter	2019-01-17	Eva Respini	Chief Curator at the Institute of Contemporary Art
2018	Fall	2018-11-29	Lina Iris Viktor	Conceptual Artist
2018	Fall	2018-11-08	Hetain Patel	Conceptual Artist and Performer
2018	Fall	2018-11-07	Carolee Schneemann	Filmmaker and Multidisciplinary Artist
2018	Fall	2018-11-01	Bob Kramer	Master Bladesmith
2018	Fall	2018-10-25	Alice Rawsthorn	Design Critic and Author of Hello World: Where Design Meets Life and Design as an Attitude
2018	Fall	2018-10-18	Nigel Poor	Fine Art Photographer
2018	Fall	2018-10-11	Blue Planet production team	Planet Earth BBC Series
2018	Fall	2018-10-07	Xu Bing	Artist and Film Director
2018	Fall	2018-10-04	Emory Douglas	Revolutionary Artist and Minister of Culture for the Black Panther Party
2018	Fall	2018-10-03	Catherine Opie	Fine-Art Photographer
2018	Fall	2018-09-27	Ariel Waldman	Council Member for the NASA Innovative Advanced Concepts Program
2018	Fall	2018-09-20	Morag Myerscough	Artist & Designer
2018	Fall	2018-09-13	Osborne Macharia & Blinky Bill	Photographer & Digital Artist and Singer-Songwriter
2018	Winter	2018-04-20	Building Contemporaries	Artists
2018	Winter	2018-03-29	Brian Selznick	Illustrator & Author of The Invention of Hugo Cabret
2018	Winter	2018-03-22	Yvonne Rainer	Dancer
2018	Winter	2018-03-15	Chelsea Manning	Activist & Whistleblower
2018	Winter	2018-03-08	Giogia Lupi	Information Designer
2018	Winter	2018-02-15	Jaime Hayon	Designer
2018	Winter	2018-02-08	Stephen Burks	Designer
2018	Winter	2018-02-07	Joseph Keckler	Singer, Musician & Performing Artist
2018	Winter	2018-02-01	Ebony Patterson	Visual Artist
2018	Winter	2018-01-25	Hito Steyerl	Filmmaker
2018	Winter	2018-01-23	Chico MacMurtie	Media Installer & Sculptor
2018	Winter	2018-01-18	Claudia Rankine & P. Carl	Author & Poet and Lecturer
2017	Fall	2017-12-07	Buster Simpson	Sculptor
2017	Fall	2017-11-30	Justine Mahoney	Figurative Sculptor
2017	Fall	2017-11-27	John Lewis, & Andrew Aydin & Nate Powell	Politician and Digital Director and Policy Advisor and Graphic Novelist
2017	Fall	2017-11-09	Art Spiegelman	Cartoonist & Graphic Artist known for Maus
2017	Fall	2017-11-02	Morehshin Allahyari	Media Artist
2017	Fall	2017-10-24	Jason Yates	Artist
2017	Fall	2017-10-21	Penny Arcade	Performance Artist, Actress, Poet & Media Maker
2017	Fall	2017-10-19	Kiki Smith	Artist
2017	Fall	2017-10-18	Mark Dion	Conceptual Artist
2017	Fall	2017-10-12	Jennifer Daniel	Illustrator & Graphic Designer
2017	Fall	2017-10-05	Christo	Sculptor
2017	Fall	2017-09-28	Keiji Ashizawa	Architectural Designer
2017	Fall	2017-09-14	Jessica Care Moore	Poet
2017	Winter	2017-06-22	Joyce Jenje-Makwenda & Melvin Peters	Archivists & Historians
2017	Winter	2017-04-19	Doug Miro	Screenwriter
2017	Winter	2017-04-06	Heather Dewey-Hagborg	Information Activist & Bio-Hacker
2017	Winter	2017-03-30	Karim Rashid	Industrial Designer
2017	Winter	2017-03-23	New Negress Film Society	Collective of Black Women Filmmakers
2017	Winter	2017-03-20	Tracey Snelling	Contemporary Artist
2017	Winter	2017-03-16	Saya Woolfalk	Science Fiction & Fantasy Artist
2017	Winter	2017-03-09	Andrew Logan	Sculptor, Performance Artist, Jewellery-Maker, & Portraitist
2017	Winter	2017-02-16	Ping Chong	Contemporary Theater Director, Choreographer, Video & Installation Artist
2017	Winter	2017-02-09	Jonathan Barnbrook	Graphic Designer, Filmmaker & Typographer
2017	Winter	2017-02-02	Sara Hendren	Artist & Designer
2017	Winter	2017-01-26	Hank Willis Thomas	Conceptual Artist
2017	Winter	2017-01-19	Joe Sacco	Cartoonist & Journalist
2017	Winter	2017-01-17	Meredith Monk	Composer
2017	Winter	2017-01-12	Robert Platt	Artist & Architectural Installer
2016	Fall	2016-12-01	Roland Graf	Media Artist, Design Researcher, & Inventor.
2016	Fall	2016-11-17	Jane Fulton Suri	Design Director at IDEO
2016	Fall	2016-11-10	Athi-Patra Ruga	South-African Artist
2016	Fall	2016-11-09	Mary Mattingly	Visual Artist
2016	Fall	2016-11-03	Fred Gelli	Designer
2016	Fall	2016-10-27	Philip Beesley & Iris van Herpen	Visual Artist & Architect and Fashion Designer
2016	Fall	2016-10-20	Wynwood Walls	Outdoor Museum featuring Street Art and Graffiti
2016	Fall	2016-10-13	Not An Alternative	Art Collective
2016	Fall	2016-10-06	Miwa Matreyek	Director, Animator & Designer
2016	Fall	2016-09-29	Mark Mothersbaugh	Singer, Songwriter & Composer
2016	Fall	2016-09-22	Alex Schweder	Architect & Performance Artist
2016	Fall	2016-09-15	Sanford Bigger	Interdisciplinary Artist
2016	Winter	2016-04-27	Rachel Kushner	Writer
2016	Winter	2016-04-07	Renny Ramakers	Art Historian & Critic
2016	Winter	2016-03-31	Vik Muniz	Artist & Sculptor
2016	Winter	2016-03-28	Sandow Birk	Visual Artist
2016	Winter	2016-03-24	Andrea Zittel	Artist
2016	Winter	2016-03-21	Theatre of the Eighth Day	Polish Theater Group
2016	Winter	2016-03-17	David O'Reilly	Artist, Filmmaker & Game Designer
2016	Winter	2016-03-10	Guruduth Banavar	Tech Innovator
2016	Winter	2016-02-18	Patricia Urquiola	Architect & Designer
2016	Winter	2016-02-11	Louise Fili	Graphic Designer
2016	Winter	2016-02-04	Rashaad Newsome	Visual Artist
2016	Winter	2016-01-29	Shunsuke Iwai & Ben Matsuzaki	Creative Director and the President of Herman Miller Japan
2016	Winter	2016-01-28	Dan Goods	Artist & Designer
2016	Winter	2016-01-21	Young Jean Lee	Playwright, Director & Filmmaker
2016	Winter	2016-01-14	Scott Hocking	Installation Artist, Sculptor & Photographer
2015	Fall	2015-12-03	Karen Finley	Performance Artist, Musician & Poet
2015	Fall	2015-11-19	Prem Krishnamurthy	Designer, Writer & Curator
2015	Fall	2015-11-12	Maira Kalman	Illustrator & Writer
2015	Fall	2015-11-05	Julian Schnabel	Painter & Filmmaker
2015	Fall	2015-10-29	Signe Baumane	Animator, Fine Artist, Illustrator & Writer
2015	Fall	2015-10-22	Sonya Clark	Artist
2015	Fall	2015-10-15	John Luther Adams	American Composer
2015	Fall	2015-10-08	Anna Sui	Fashion Designer
2015	Fall	2015-10-02	Masimba Hwati	Interdisciplinary Artist
2015	Fall	2015-10-01	Zanele Muholi	Artist, Visual Activist & Photographer
2015	Fall	2015-09-24	Suzanne Lee	Fashion Designer
2015	Fall	2015-09-22	Stephen Hobbs	Photographer & Sculptor
2015	Fall	2015-09-17	Miral (film screening)	Film by Julian Schnabel
2015	Winter	2015-04-09	Louis Benech	Landscape Architect
2015	Winter	2015-04-02	Kent Monkman	Visual & Performance Artist
2015	Winter	2015-03-26	Tacita Dean	Visual Artist
2015	Winter	2015-03-19	Saki Mafundikwa	Graphic Designer, Typographer and Design Educator
2015	Winter	2015-03-12	Casey Reas	Artist, creator of the Processing Programming Language
2015	Winter	2015-02-19	Jose Miguel Sokoloff	Advertising Creative
2015	Winter	2015-02-12	Elizabeth Streb	Choreographer, Performer and Teacher of Contemporary Dance.
2015	Winter	2015-02-10	Misha Friedman	Documentary Photographer
2015	Winter	2015-02-05	Kiki van Eijk	Designer
2015	Winter	2015-01-29	Osman Khan	Technological Artist
2015	Winter	2015-01-22	Alison Bechdel	Cartoonist
2015	Winter	2015-01-15	David Turnley	Photographer
2014	Fall	2014-12-04	Seth Ellis	Designer
2014	Fall	2014-11-20	Françoise Mouly	Designer, Editor & Publisher
2014	Fall	2014-11-13	Superflux	Studio for Design, Research, Art and Experiential Futures
2014	Fall	2014-11-08	Harrell Fletcher	Social Practice and Relational Aesthetics Artist
2014	Fall	2014-11-02	Inta Ruka	Photographer
2014	Fall	2014-10-30	Ryoji Ikeda	Visual & Sound Artist
2014	Fall	2014-10-23	Random International	Art Collective
2014	Fall	2014-10-17	Amie Siegel	Artist
2014	Fall	2014-10-16	Foodcorps	Non-profit Organization
2014	Fall	2014-10-09	Phil Gilbert	General manager of Design at IBM
2014	Fall	2014-10-02	Fred Tomaselli	Painter
2014	Fall	2014-09-25	Rei Inamoto	Creative Director
2014	Fall	2014-09-18	Pussy Riot	Punk Rock and Performance Art Group
2014	Fall	2014-09-11	Anna Deavere Smith	Actress & Playwright
2014	Winter	2014-05-10	David Yurman	Jewelry Designer
2014	Winter	2014-04-03	Shahzia Sikander	Visual Artist
2014	Winter	2014-03-27	Penelope Spheeris	Film Director
2014	Winter	2014-03-20	Laurie Jo Reynolds	Policy Advocate & Artist
2014	Winter	2014-03-13	Bunker Roy	Indian Social Activist who founded the Barefoot College
2014	Winter	2014-02-20	Toby Shapshak & Erik Hersman	Journalist and Technologist
2014	Winter	2014-02-06	Degenerate Art Ensemble	Musical Group
2014	Winter	2014-01-30	Candy Chang	Artist
2014	Winter	2014-01-23	Michael Graves	Architect & Designer
2014	Winter	2014-01-16	Rafael Lozano Hemmer	Electronic Artist
2013	Fall	2013-12-05	John Marshall	Artist
2013	Fall	2013-11-21	Anthony Gormley	Sculptor
2013	Fall	2013-11-14	Sputniko!	British-Japanese Artist & Designer
2013	Fall	2013-11-12	Indira Freitas Johnson	Sculptor & Community Artist
2013	Fall	2013-11-07	Lisa Strausfeld	Graphic Designer & Information Architect
2013	Fall	2013-10-31	Joseph Keckler	Singer, Musician, Performing Artist & Writer
2013	Fall	2013-10-24	Liza Donnelly	Cartoonist known for her work in The New Yorker & Resident Cartoonist of CBS News
2013	Fall	2013-10-17	Art is Open Source	Network of Artists & Designers
2013	Fall	2013-10-10	Mike Kelly (tribute and screening)	Artist
2013	Fall	2013-10-03	Mark Dziersk	American Industrial Designer
2013	Fall	2013-09-26	Mary Sibande	Painter & Sculptor
2013	Fall	2013-09-19	Simon McBurney	Actor, Writer & Director
2013	Fall	2013-09-12	Mary Ellen Mark	Photographer
2012	Fall	2012-12-06	United in Anger	Documentary
2012	Fall	2012-11-29	Janine Antoni	Sculptor, Photographer, Installation and Videographer
2012	Fall	2012-11-15	Chris Jordan	Artist
2012	Fall	2012-11-08	Stefan Sagmeister	Graphic Designer
2012	Fall	2012-11-01	Paola Antonelli	Author, Editor & Architect
2012	Fall	2012-10-25	Oliver Stone	Filmmaker
2012	Fall	2012-10-18	Alexis Rockman	Painter
2012	Fall	2012-10-11	Heavy Industries	Art Collective
2012	Fall	2012-10-04	Peter Hirshberg	Chairman, MakerCity and Former Executive at Apple
2012	Fall	2012-09-27	Jennifer Karady & Paul Rieckhoff	Photographer
2012	Fall	2012-09-20	Sally Mann	Photographer
2012	Fall	2012-09-13	PES	Filmmaker
2012	Winter	2012-05-25	Scott Hocking	Sculptor
2012	Winter	2012-05-16	Nick Tobier	Designer
2012	Winter	2012-04-05	Shelly Berg	Jazz Pianist
2012	Winter	2012-03-29	Craig Baldwin	Experimental Filmmaker
2012	Winter	2012-03-22	Sue Coe	Political Artist
2012	Winter	2012-03-15	Ernesto Neto	Sculptor
2012	Winter	2012-03-08	Matthew Carter & Roger Black	Type Designer & Design Director
2012	Winter	2012-02-16	Wayne McGregor	Choreographer
2012	Winter	2012-02-09	Ayse Birsel	Co-Founder of Birsel + Seck
2012	Winter	2012-02-02	Robert Hammond	Co-Founder and Executive Director of High Line
2012	Winter	2012-01-26	Maira Kalman & Daniel Handler	Illustrator, Author, and Designer & Author of A Series of Unfortunate Events
2012	Winter	2012-01-19	Tony Fry	Professor of Design
2012	Winter	2012-01-15	Philip Glass & Robert Wilson	Director and Composer of Einstein on the Beach
2011	Fall	2011-12-08	Naif Al-Mutawa	Clinical Psychologist and Creator of The 99
2011	Fall	2011-12-01	Paul Kaiser	Digital Artist
2011	Fall	2011-11-17	Justin Vivian Bond	Singer, Songwriter and Performance Artist
2011	Fall	2011-11-10	Nick Cave	Fabric Sculptor, Dancer, and Performance Artist
2011	Fall	2011-11-03	Zandra Rhodes	Fashion and Textile Designer
2011	Fall	2011-10-27	Emily Pilloton	Designer and Owner of Project H Design
2011	Fall	2011-10-20	Sissel Tolaas	Artist
2011	Fall	2011-10-06	Mariko Mori	Multidisciplinary Artist
2011	Fall	2011-09-29	Mark Dion	Architect
2011	Fall	2011-09-22	François Delarozière	Artistic Director of La Machine
2011	Fall	2011-09-15	Cory Doctorow, Mark Stevenson & James King	Futurologists
2011	Winter	2011-04-07	Paul D. Miller (DJ Spooky)	Renowned Composer and Multimedia Artist
2011	Winter	2011-03-31	Mitchell Joachim	Ecological and Urban Designer
2011	Winter	2011-03-24	Utopia in Four Movements	Multi-Media Documentary
2011	Winter	2011-03-17	Number 17	Design Firm
2011	Winter	2011-03-10	Betsy Damon	Ecological Artist
2011	Winter	2011-02-17	J Mays	Vice-President of design for Ford Motor Company
2011	Winter	2011-02-10	David Maisel	Visual Artist
2011	Winter	2011-01-27	Anne Mondro	Visual Artist
2011	Winter	2011-01-20	Maude Barlow	Author, Activist & Co-Founder of The Blue Planet Project
2011	Winter	2011-01-13	Laurie Anderson	Performance Artist, Musician, Writer and Visual Artist
2010	Fall	2010-09-09	Temple Grandin	Doctor of Animal Science
2010	Fall	2010-09-16	Christopher Csikszentmihalyi & Mihaly Csikszentmihalyi	Professor of Psychology
2010	Fall	2010-09-23	Christopher Sperandio & Simon Grennan	Cartoonist
2010	Fall	2010-09-30	Joumana Haddad	Journalist
2010	Fall	2010-10-07	Marije Vogelzang	Designer
2010	Fall	2010-10-21	Matthew Ritchie	Painter
2010	Fall	2010-10-28	Sarah Chayes	Reporter
2010	Fall	2010-11-04	Laura Kuhn	Executive director, John Cage Trust
2010	Fall	2010-11-11	Iñigo Manglano-Ovalle	Installation Artist
2010	Fall	2010-11-18	Wangechi Mutu	Painter
2010	Fall	2010-12-02	Luis Chomiak	Industrial Designer
2010	Fall	2010-12-09	Natasha Tsakos	Performance Artist
2010	Winter	2010-04-08	Tim Brown	Industrial Designer
2010	Winter	2010-04-01	Cameron Carpenter	Musician
2010	Winter	2010-03-25	Matthias Müller	Filmmaker
2010	Winter	2010-03-18	Marian Bantjes	Graphic Designer
2010	Winter	2010-03-11	Dayna Baumeister	Biomomicry
2010	Winter	2010-02-18	Saskia Olde Wolbers	Installation Artist
2010	Winter	2010-02-11	James Geary	Writer
2010	Winter	2010-02-04	Bjarke Ingels	Architect
2010	Winter	2010-01-28	Dave Hickey	Writer
2010	Winter	2010-01-21	Bill T. Jones	Dancer/Choreographer
2009	Fall	2009-12-10	Lucy Orta	Fashion Designer
2009	Fall	2009-12-03	Stewart Brand	Critical Thinker and Innovator
2009	Fall	2009-11-19	Phoebe Gloeckner	Graphic Novelist
2009	Fall	2009-11-12	Robert & Shana ParkeHarrison	Photographer
2009	Fall	2009-11-05	Jamy Ian Swiss	Performance Artist
2009	Fall	2009-10-29	Margaret Livingstone	Neurobiologist
2009	Fall	2009-10-22	Paula Scher	Graphic Designer
2009	Fall	2009-10-08	Bernard Khoury	Architect
2009	Fall	2009-10-01	Douglas Hollis	Installation Artist
2009	Fall	2009-09-24	Dave Gallo & Bill Lange	Ocean Explorer
2009	Fall	2009-09-17	Richard Barnes	Photographer
2009	Fall	2009-09-10	Robert Mankoff	Cartoonist
2009	Winter	2009-04-09	Clotaire Rapaille	Critical Thinker and Innovator
2009	Winter	2009-04-02	Mary Ellen Strom	Installation Artist
2009	Winter	2009-03-26	George Manupelli	Filmmaker
2009	Winter	2009-03-19	Marina Abramović	Performance Artist
2009	Winter	2009-03-12	Richard Saul Wurman	Graphic Designer
2009	Winter	2009-03-05	Jacque Fresco	Architect
2009	Winter	2009-02-12	Anne Pasternak	Curator
2009	Winter	2009-02-05	José Francisco Salgado	Astronomer
2009	Winter	2009-01-22	Gilgamesh	Musician
2008	Fall	2008-11-20	Daniel J. Martinez	Installation Artist/Performance Artist
2008	Fall	2008-11-13	Jun Nguyen-Hatsushiba	Filmmaker
2008	Fall	2008-11-06	Theo Jansen	Sculptor
2008	Fall	2008-10-30	Antanas Mockus	Politician
2008	Fall	2008-10-23	Jane Evelyn Atwood	Photographer
2008	Fall	2008-10-09	Cheyenne Medina & Gretchen Schulfer	Graphic Designer
2008	Fall	2008-10-02	Cary Fowler	Critical Thinker and Innovator
2008	Fall	2008-09-25	Sir Ken Robinson	Critical Thinker and Innovator
2008	Fall	2008-09-18	Michael Moore	Filmmaker
2008	Fall	2008-09-12	Complicité	Performance Artist
2008	Fall	2008-09-11	Stasys Eidrigevicius	Visual Artist
2008	Winter	2008-04-03	Michele Oka Doner	Sculptor
2008	Winter	2008-03-27	Joost Rekveld	Filmmaker
2008	Winter	2008-03-20	Eric Staller	Public Artist
2008	Winter	2008-03-13	Julie Mehretu	Painter
2008	Winter	2008-03-06	Chip Kidd	Graphic Designer
2008	Winter	2008-02-14	Trimpin	Sound Artist
2008	Winter	2008-01-17	Chaz Maviyane-Davies	Graphic designer
2008	Winter	2008-01-10	Dan Hurlin	Puppetteer
2007	Fall	2007-11-29	Lawrence Weschler	Writer
2007	Fall	2007-11-08	Xu Bing	Installation Artist
2007	Fall	2007-11-01	Pat Oleszko	Performance artist
2007	Fall	2007-10-25	Charles McGee	Painter
2007	Fall	2007-10-18	Andy Kirshner	Performance Artist
2007	Fall	2007-10-04	Carole Bilson	Industrial Designer
2007	Fall	2007-09-27	Gijs Bakker, Droog Design	Industrial Designer
2007	Fall	2007-09-20	Ellen Lupton	Graphic Designer
2007	Fall	2007-09-13	Jeremy Deller	Public Artist
2007	Winter	2007-04-05	Liz Lerman	Dancer/Choreographer
2007	Winter	2007-03-29	Franz John	Installation Artist
2007	Winter	2007-03-22	Ken Jacobs	Filmmaker
2007	Winter	2007-03-15	David Small	Graphic Designer
2007	Winter	2007-03-08	William Pope.L	Performance Artist
2007	Winter	2007-02-15	Peter Richards	Public Artist
2007	Winter	2007-02-08	2x4 Design	Graphic Designer
2007	Winter	2007-02-01	Shrinking Cities	Filmmaker
2007	Winter	2007-01-25	Janie Paul	Visual Artist
2007	Winter	2007-01-18	Anne Wilson	Installation Artist
2006	Fall	2006-11-30	Chris Impey	Astronomer
2006	Fall	2006-11-16	Susie Brandt	Textile Artist
2006	Fall	2006-11-09	Father Boyle	Social Worker
2006	Fall	2006-11-02	Royal Shakespeare Company	Performance Artist
2006	Fall	2006-10-26	Ellen Harvey	Painter
2006	Fall	2006-10-19	Alicyn Warren	Composer/New Media Artist
2006	Fall	2006-10-05	Peter Chung	Animator
2006	Fall	2006-09-28	Nikki Lee	Photographer
2006	Fall	2006-09-21	Amy Goodman	Journalist
2006	Fall	2006-09-14	Marga Gomez	Performance Artist

== Partners ==
The 2020-2021 Speaker Series is produced with help from DPTV.org and PBS Books.
