= Marije =

Marije is a given name. Notable people with this name include:

- Marije van Hunenstijn (born 1995), Dutch sprinter
- Marije Joling (born 1987), Dutch female allround speed skater
- Marije Tolman (born 1976), Dutch illustrator of children's literature
- Marije Vogelzang, Dutch food designer
