= The Violence of Gender =

Hong Kong art exhibition

- Traditional Chinese: 藝術不夜館：性別的暴力（從香港角度探討）座談會
- Simplified Chinese: 艺术不夜馆：性别的暴力（从香港角度探讨）座探会
Transcriptions
Standard Mandarin
- Hanyu Pinyin: yìshù bù yèguǎn: xìngbié de bàolì (Cóng Xiānggǎng jiǎodù tàntǎo) zuò tànhuì
Yue: Cantonese
- Jyutping: ngai6 seot6 bat1 je6 gun2: sing3 bit6 dik1 bou6 lik6 (cung4 hoeng1 gong2 gok3 dou6 taam3 tou2) zo6 taam3 wui5

"Performing Society: The Violence of Gender" (Chinese: 藝術不夜館：性別的暴力（從香港角度探討）座談會) was an art exhibition, hosted in Tai Kwun, Hong Kong from 16 February to 28 April 2019. The artist panel was held on 7 March 2019. It discussed how the themes of gender and violence intersect.

The published article in The Stand News (立場新聞) quoted two artworks from the show to discuss what's violent.

== Artists ==
There were 11 artists from around the world featured in the exhibit. Ten are female and one is male.

Participating artists

- Dong Jinling
- Jana Euler
- Anne Imhof
- Oliver Laric
- Liu Yefu
- Ma Qiusha
- Julia Phillips
- Pamela Rosenkranz
- Marianna Simnett
- Raphaela Vogel
- Wong Ping

== Reception ==
Rachel Cheung of the South China Morning Post reviewed the exhibition. She stated that "Tai Kwun should be applauded for putting up a show on the timely topic" and that publicly discussing the subject brings progress on the matter. Cheung argued that the protagonist of the animation Who’s the Daddy, a 2017 short film by Wong Ping, reflects misogyny in regards to bodies and that the work overall "feels out of place in the exhibition."
