= Garth Amundson and Pierre Gour =

American artists

Garth Amundson and Pierre Gour are two artists who work collaboratively, using vintage photographs to incorporate history into art. Amundson is American and Gour is Canadian.

Amundson was born in Washington State. He received his MFA from Syracuse University. Gour was born and raised in Canada. He received his MFA from the University of New Mexico. The two men began their professional collaboration after meeting at a conference in Banff. They have been in a personal relationship since that meeting

Amundson and Gour are both faculty in the Department of Art & Art History at Western Washington University in Bellingham, where they live. Both artists have won numerous teaching grants and awards.

== Collaborative work ==
Amundson and Gour seek out old photographs from thrift shops and antique stores for use in their art. They explore themes and topics related to migration, queer identity, categorization, and deconstructing indexical truth. Their critical exchanges and dialogues fuel all of their collaged and installation projects.

One collaboration, Penetrating Cuts, uses historical archives to investigate the historic application and use of vintage photographs. Using hundreds of photographs along with personal candid photographs, the photographs function as historical evidence of lost identity. In a catalog essay Judith Gutman comments, "photographs may be our most perfect cultural artifacts."

In Button History, that began at the Bellagio Residency, the artists invited international residents there to join them in stitching buttons onto the archival prints. While engaged in adding buttons, the residents shared stories and experiences, evoking ideas of identity and craft.

Artist/photographer Rebekah Modrak commented that

"their work extends and builds upon a historical strategy (in the tradition of Hannah Hoch and John Heartfield to Annette Messager) that acknowledges that the conversation about identity is already ongoing - in portrait studios and magazines - and prefers to join in at that point."

To Jonathan Katz, in the work of

"Amundson and Gour, this reorientation of history is the founding act of a new queer epistemology, one that surfs the world, collecting and arranging its “historical” evidence with no less a self-serving mission than church and state once did—it is just more honest, and more beautiful."

Gayle Clemens writes,

"As creative collaborators and life partners, Amundson and Our bring a profound intimacy to their work as they excavate the intersections between personal and cultural histories."

== Solo exhibitions ==
- 2000 The College of Wooster Art Museum, Objective Distortions, Wooster, OH. Exhibition by Amundson.
- 2005 Nordic Heritage Museum, Invitational Solo Exhibition, (Sept-October) Seattle, WA
- 2009: Candyland/rum för samtidig konstupplevelse, Cut-It-Out, Stockholm, Sweden
- 2011: Collins Art Gallery GRCC, Repercussions: Tides & Time,invitational exhibition, Grand Rapids, MI
- 2013: The Gallery at University of Texas, Art + Art History Department UTA, Arlington, TX
- 2014: Photo Center Northwest, Process, Seattle, WA
- 2018: Prichard Art Gallery, University of Idaho College of Art & Architecture
