= Lycée Fénelon Sainte-Marie =

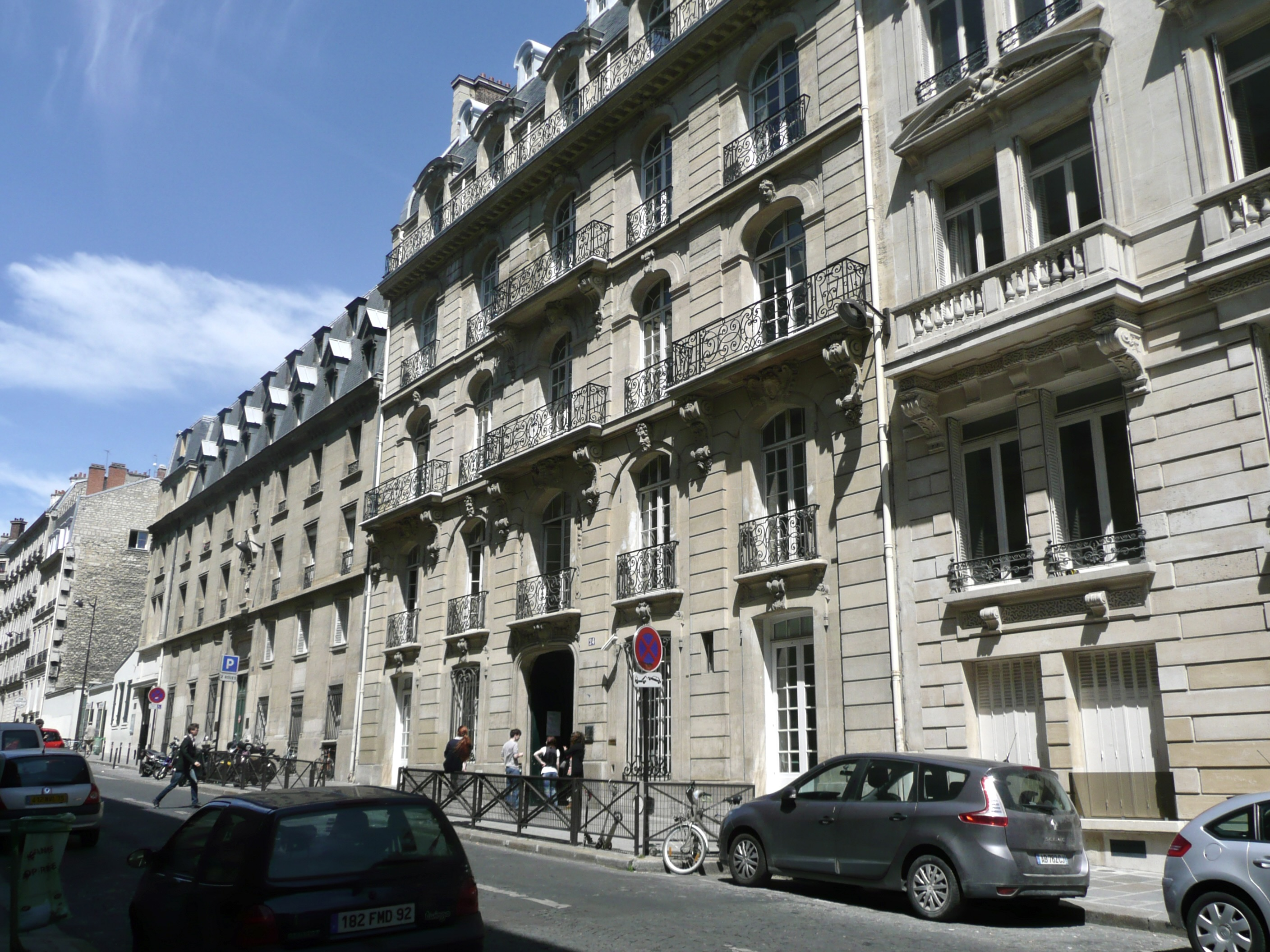
- The façade of the lycée

Location
- 47, rue de Naples (Collège); 24 rue du Général Foy (Lycée), Paris; France
- Coordinates: 48.879161°N 2.316460°E

Information
- Principal: François Combescure
- Website: www.fenelonsaintemarie.org

The lycée Fénelon Sainte-Marie is a private Catholic school located in the 8th arrondissement of Paris. It takes classes from the 6th form to the end of education (8 classes per level).

== History ==
The Fénelon college, named for François Fénelon, was founded in 1869 by priests from the diocese of Paris. Until 1968, it was just for lycée students; it then joined with the Sainte-Marie de Monceau college, run by the Society of Mary (Marianists) and became the Fénelon Sainte-Marie College from Year 11 to the end of schooling. A later merge happened with the Saint-Augustin College, rue de la Bienfaisance, which established primary classes. The establishment then took the name of Fénelon Sainte-Marie Saint-Augustin. Finally, in 1980, with the merger with Sainte-Marie La Madeleine, a girls' school from primary pupils on rue de Monceau and rue de Tocqueville, the school became mixed.

Today, it consists of a college, a lycée and classe préparatoire aux grandes écoles (CGPE), in the sections MPI, MP, PC and PSI.

Some classes are located at 47, rue de Naples and others at 24, rue du Général-Foy.

=== School ranking ===
As of 2018, the lycée was ranked 6th out of 108 at départemental level in terms of quality of teaching, and 12th out of 2277 at national level. The ranking was based on three criteria: the level of bac results, the proportion of students achieving their baccalauréat having spent their last two years at the establishment, and the added value (calculated based on social origin of the students, their age, and their national diploma results).

=== CPGE rankings ===
The national rankings of classes préparatoires aux grandes écoles (CPGE) are calculated based on level of admission of students to the grandes écoles. In 2015, L'Étudiant gave the following ranking for courses of 2014 :

Course	Students admitted to a grande école^{*}	Rate of admission^{*}	Average level over 5 years	National ranking	Comparison to previous year
MP / MP*	5 / 64 students	8%	7%	36th ex-æquo out of 114	▲4
PC / PC*	2 / 39 students	5%	3%	39th out of 110	▲17
PSI / PSI*	15 / 44 students	34%	34%	14th out of 120	▼2
Source : Classement 2015 des prépas - L'Étudiant (concours de 2014). * the level of admission depends on the grandes écoles included in the study. In scientific fields, there are a group of 11 of the 17 engineering schools that were selected by L'Étudiant according to the sector (MP, PC, PSI, PT or BCPST).

== Former chaplains ==
- Jacques Benoit-Gonnin, Bishop of Beauvais, Noyon and Senlis.
- Denis Metzinger, curate of the Église Saint-Charles-de-Monceau

== Former teachers ==
- Amos Coulanges, musician

== Former students ==
Former students by date of birth:

- Théodore Botrel (1868–1925), singer, author, songwriter and composer
- Pierre Corvol (1941–), doctor and biological researcher
- Jean-Claude Trichet (1942–), French diplomat
- Christophe Dechavanne (1958–), French television and radio presenter and producer
- Arnaud de Puyfontaine (1964–), President of Vivendi
- Sophie Dudemaine (1965–) under her real name of Sophie Caillabet, French chef
- Fatine Layt (1967–), businesswoman
- Eva Green (1980–), actress
- Dorothée Dupuis (1980–), French art critic
- Daphné Bürki (1980–), television presenter
- Ève Chems de Brouwer (1980–), French actress
- Raphaël Hamburger (1981–), music producer, son of Michel Berger and France Gall
- Clément Bénech (1991–), French writer
