= Simnett =

Simnett is a surname. Notable people with the surname include:

- Marianna Simnett (born 1986), Berlin-based artist
- Mark Simnett (fl. 1988–1994), former member of the band Bark Psychosis
- Sophie Simnett (born 1997), English actress
