= Asad Raza =

Asad Raza may refer to:

- Asad Raza (artist), American artist
- Asad Raza (cricketer) (born 1997), Pakistani cricketer
