= Louis Benech =

French landscape architect

Louis Benech (born February 16, 1957) is a French gardener, landscaper, and landscape architect. He is sometimes called "France's greatest living landscape designer."

== Education and early career ==
Benech was born in Neuilly-sur-Seine. He grew up on the Île de Ré, which, being continually swept by gales, has very few trees. As a boy, he loved nature, especially trees and birds, and collected plants and insects. When he went to France's mainland, he began kissing trees. During the summers from 1970 to 1976 he learned English and worked as a gardener in a park in Perthshire, Scotland. During the summer of 1977 he traveled to the United States, collected seeds across North America, and visited the Arnold Arboretum.

As a teenager, Benech wanted to study forestry in one of France's agro schools, such as Institut Agro Rennes-Angers. However, he performed poorly in mathematics and physics and excellently in English and philosophy so he decided to study law. When he started his law studies, he taught English to inmates in prisons. In 1982 he interrupted his law studies and becomes a horticultural worker in Southampton, England at Hillier Nurseries and worked there for a year and a half. He obtained the horticultural position with the help of Robert Mallet-Stevens. Upon returning to the study of law, Benech wrote his mémoire in comparative law on how France, Switzerland, and Russia dealt with the legal protection of plants. After graduating with a master's degree in labor law, he started an internship in a law firm, but found the work unpleasant. In 1985 he decided to abandon the practice of law and become a gardener and landscaper, starting his own company in Paris.

== Career as a landscaper with an international reputation ==
Benech's first major commission was near the village of Cernay, Eure-et-Loir for the gardens of Château du Bois Hinoust, which had recently been purchased by Stanislas and Leticia Poniatowski. By 1987 Benech gained a significant reputation. He became a landscape gardener on a private property in Normandy at the Piencourt stud farm, which led to him finding several other clients, including Marie-Hélène de Rothschild, Anne d'Ornano, and Pierre Bergé for the gardens of Château Gabriel in Benerville-sur-Mer. In 1990 Benech, with Pascal Cribier and François Roubaud, won the competition for the renovation of the old part of the Tuileries Garden (Jardin des Tuileries). The work at the Tuileries Garden in Paris launched Benech into a national and international career which made him one of the world's most prominent landscape designers. The Tuileries project spread over ten years and brought recognition with multiple requests from wealthy garden owners. During the project, Benech and his team planted more than 3,000 trees.

Besides the Tuileries Garden, some of the best examples of landscaping done by Benech are at the Water Theater Grove in the Palace of Versailles, the Élysée Palace Gardens in Paris, the rose garden of Rose Pavilion in Pavlovsk Park, Saint Petersburg, and the Gardens of the Achilleion Palace in Corfu. Some of the other many already established gardens, that Benech has worked on include the Quai d'Orsay, the estate of Courson, the quadrilateral (main square) of France's National Archives, and the Hauteville House. At the beginning of the 2010s, he worked on the partial renovation of the park of domaine de Chaumont-sur-Loire and a diagnosis on the Château de Maisons-Laffitte.

In 2002 he created an outstanding, non-irrigated garden in Greece. According to Benech, 80% of the Greek islands have a natural inadequacy of fresh water.

By the beginning of the 2020s, Benech had designed and carried out with his Parisian team more than 500 public and private park and garden projects. His projects for individuals lead him to work in France and abroad (in Greece, Morocco, Portugal, Switzerland, Egypt, Panama, Canada, United States, and New Zealand's Chatham Islands). He also completed projects for institutions such as Axa (Hôtel de la Vaupalière in Paris in 2000), Suez (former Hôtel Suchet in Paris in 2001), the gardens of Château de Pange belonging to the general council of Moselle, and Hermès (Dosan Park in Seoul in 2006; Ateliers de Pantin, since 2008).

== Benech's approach to garden design ==
Benech emphasizes that he began as a gardener with an extensive, practical knowledge of plants. According to Benech, French garden owners focus on a garden's design rather than the garden's individual plants, while English garden owners focus more on the plants chosen and the variety of cultivars. He tries to adapt the garden to the surrounding landscape and the house near the garden. He takes into account what the garden's owners want and need and then focuses on economical and maintenance issues more than garden art.

With an eclectic style, the creations of Louis Benech are characterized by his concern to harmonize the landscape with the architectural or natural environment of the site, to create perennial gardens (with necessary ecological considerations), and to combine plant aesthetics with the local ecosystem, the use that will be made of the garden, and the technical constraints of maintenance. Benech takes into account hydrological circulation and visual perspectives.

== Family and personal life ==
An uncle of the novelist and journalist Clément Bénech, Louis Benech had a father who worked as an architect, a mother who loved flowers, and two grandmothers who enjoyed gardening.

Louis Benech was the companion of French fashion designer Christian Louboutin from about 1997 to about 2016. The two divided their time between homes in various places, including France, Egypt, and the Maldives.

== Selected projects ==
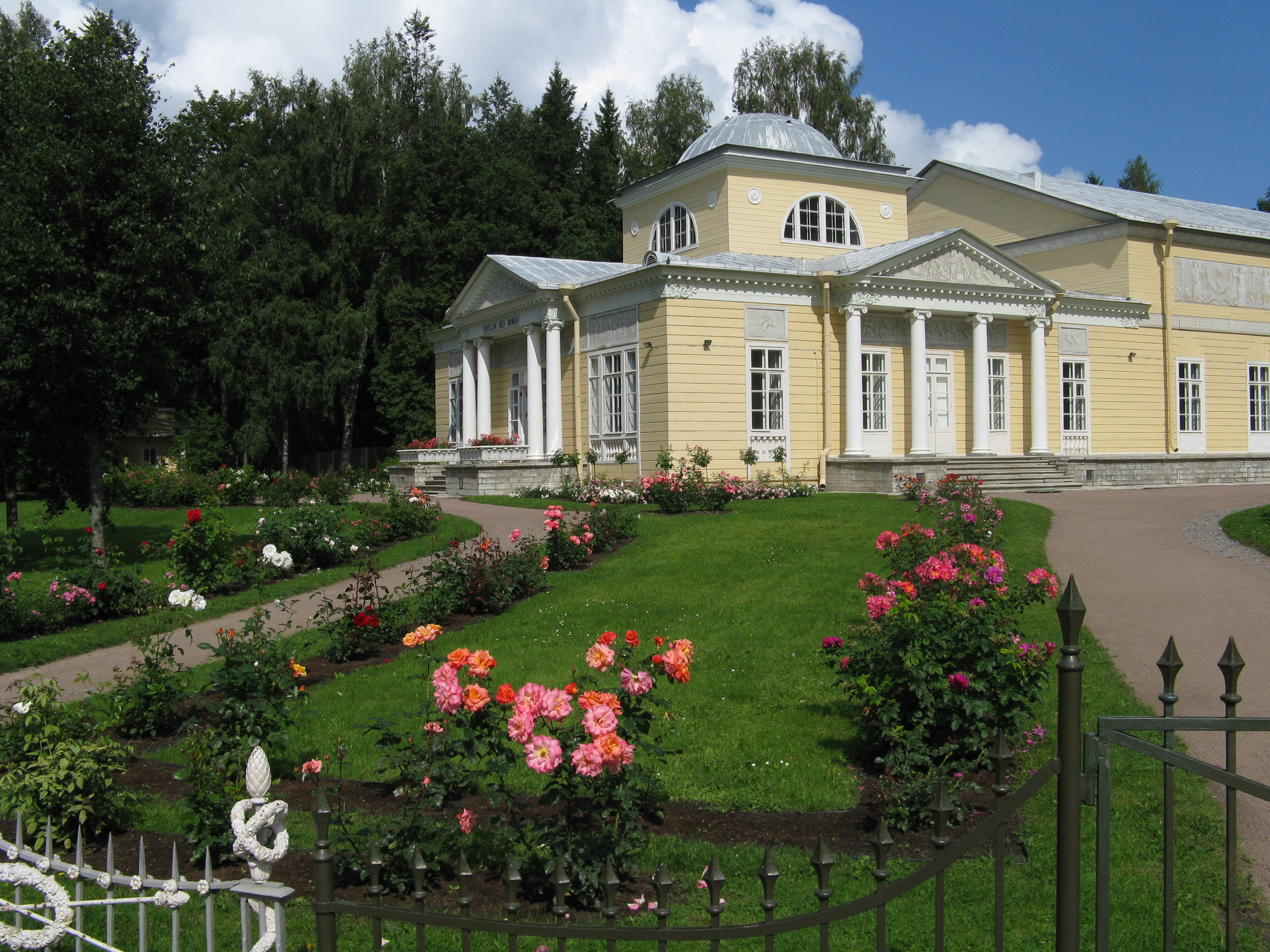
View of Rose Pavilion, in Pavlovsk Park.

- Prés du Goualoup (a garden park) of Domaine de Chaumont-sur-Loire (2011–2012)
- Landscaped walk through the gardens of the quadrilateral (main square) of the Archives Nationales of Paris (2011)
- Garden of the Royal Monceau Hotel in Paris (2009–2010)
- Garden of the Quinta da Romaneira hotel (Portugal) (2007)
- Garden of Saint Louis Cathedral in New Orleans (2009–2010) (U.S.A.)
- Gardens of the Sun and Clouds of Château de Villandry (2007–2008)
- Garden of the Dar Ahlam hotel, Ouarzazate (2004)
- Restoration of the garden of the Gustave Caillebotte property in Yerres (2006)
- Garden of Château de Pange in Lorraine (2000–2003)
- Rehabilitation of Mont Saint-Esprit in Le Croisic (1999–2001)
- Rehabilitation of the garden of the Hôtel du Quai d'Orsay in Paris (1997–1999 and 2009)
- Assistance with replanting work at domaine national de Saint-Cloud (1996–1997)
- Rose garden of the Rose Pavilion park of the Pavlovsk Palace in Saint Petersburg (1992-1995)
- Jardim das Princesas (Garden of Princesses) of the National Museum of Brazil (Rio de Janeiro) (1992–1995) (partially destroyed by fire in 2018)
- Garden of Europe of Futuroscope in Poitiers (1990–1992)
- Redevelopment of the Tuileries Garden in Paris (collaborative work, 1990–2000, and advice since 2007)
- Piencourt Garden in Cormeilles, Eure (1985–1990)
- Rose garden of the Saint-Michel priory in Vimoutiers
- The garden of the Maison des Lumières Denis Diderot in Langres (2012)
- Roof terrace in New York in 2013 for Diane von Fürstenberg
- Garden of the Hermès workshops in Pantin
- Garden and patio of the Hotel Collège des Doctrinaires de Lectoure in Lectoure (2019)

== Awards and honours ==
- one of the co-founders of the Conservatoire des collections végétales spécialisées (CCVS)
- Member of the Royal Horticultural Society
- Member of the Worshipful Company of Gardeners, City of London
- Member of the International Dendrology Society (1987)
- Chevalier de la Légion d'honneur (2005)
- Member of Le Conseil national des parcs et jardins (CNPJ), Ministère de la Culture (2007–2013)
- Chevalier de l'ordre des Arts et des Lettres
- Penny Stamps Distinguished Speaker (winter 2015)

== Bibliography ==
- Castellucio, Stéphane; Mabille, Gérard; Benech, Louis (23 April 1998). Vues de jardins de Marly: Le roi jardinier. Gourcuff. ISBN 2-909838-27-7; 236 pages
- Benech, Louis (6 May 1998). L'esprit du jardin: Structures, rythmes et proportions. fleurs et couleurs (in French). Paris: éditions du Chêne. ISBN 2-84277-076-5; 144 pages
- Benech, Louis; Patrice de Nussac; Herscher, Georges (10 August 1999). Jardins de cuisiniers (in French). Arles: Actes Sud. ISBN 2-7427-2426-5; 189 pages
- Brochard, Daniel; Benech, Louis (1 February 2004). Le jardin de ville (in French). Paris: Nathan. ISBN 2-09-261061-9; 160 pages
- Erik Orsenna (préface); Jansen Eric (text); Sander, Eric (photographs) (1 October 2012). Louis Benech, douze jardins en France (in French). Montreuil: Gourcuff Gradenigo. ISBN 978-2-35340-131-4; 222 pages
- Jansen, Eric Louis Benech, douze jardins ailleurs, éditions Gourcuff-Gradenigo, 2020. ISBN 978-2353403141; 2013 edition in English ISBN 2353401554
