= Stamps School of Art and Design =

Art school of the University of Michigan

Coordinates: 42°17′24.0″N 83°43′02.2″W

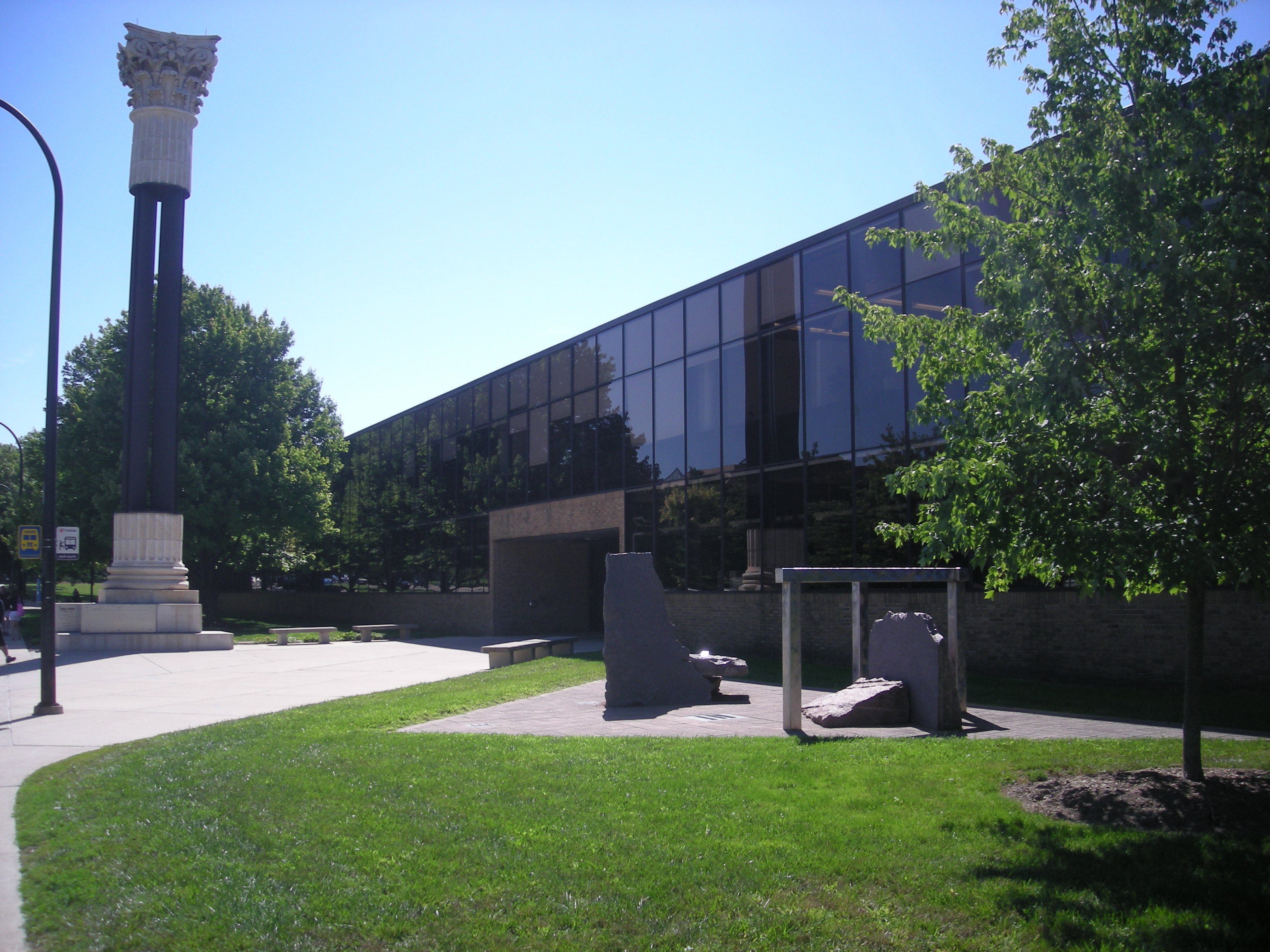
- Art & Architecture Building with centennial monument in front, North Campus
- Other names: Penny W. Stamps School of Art and Design
- Former names: School of Art and Design (1974–2012)
- Type: Public
- Established: 1974; 52 years ago
- Parent institution: University of Michigan
- Dean: Carlos Francisco Jackson
- Faculty: 40
- Administrative staff: 40
- Undergraduates: 500
- Postgraduates: 30
- Location: Ann Arbor, Michigan, United States
- Website: stamps.umich.edu

The Stamps School of Art and Design is the school of art and design of the University of Michigan, located in Ann Arbor, Michigan. The school offers undergraduate and graduate degree programs in art and design. It was established in 1974 as the School of Art and Design and renamed in 2012 for Penny and E. Roe Stamps. The main facility is located in the Art and Architecture Building on the North Campus.

== History ==
Established as the School of Art and Design in 1974, the School of Art and Design is one of 19 schools and colleges at the University of Michigan. It is fully accredited by the National Association of Schools of Art and Design. The school's academic programs and projects focus on generating new creative work, integrating the cultures of art and design, and engaging with the university, region, and national and international communities. In 2012, the School of Art and Design was renamed for Penny and E. Roe Stamps in honor of their longtime support of the school, which included a US$32.5 million gift in September 2012.

== Academics ==
=== Pre-college programs ===
The Stamps Pre-College programs were established in 2008. The Stamps School of Art & Design offers Spring Studio classes and Summer Studio sessions. Virtual and in-person programs are offered to current high school students (grades 9 – 12) interested in building new skills for their creative pursuits. Students receive personalized training and advice from Stamps faculty and staff on building a competitive portfolio.

=== Faculty and staff ===
The Penny W. Stamps School of Art & Design employs over 40 full-time faculty. Fifteen of the full-time faculty hold dual appointments in the school and another discipline at the university. Another 15 faculty, based in University disciplines outside of Art & Design, are jointly appointed in the school. David Chung (artist) serves as the director for the MFA program. Four of the school's current professors, Phoebe Gloeckner, and Holly Hughes, Heidi Kumao, Endi E. Poskovic are recipients of the Guggenheim Fellowship. In 2010, Associate Professor Rebekah Modrak published Reframing Photography, a pioneering textbook in photographic education. In 2011, Associate Professor Matt Kenyon's work, Notepad, was acquired by the Museum of Modern Art. 40 other administrative and technical staff support the School's programs.

=== Exhibitions ===
The Penny W. Stamps School of Art & Design maintains two galleries for the presentation of creative work by students, faculty, staff, and the larger community of artists/designers, as well as PLAY, an online gallery space devoted to time-based work.

=== Lectures and visitors program ===
The Penny W. Stamps School of Art & Design offers two visitors programs – the Penny Stamps Distinguished Speakers Series and the Roman J. Witt Visitors Program. Both are funded by Penny W. and E. Roe Stamps. The Penny W. Stamps Distinguished Visitors Series brings emerging and established artists/designers from a broad spectrum of media to the School to conduct a public lecture and engage with students, faculty, and the larger University and Ann Arbor communities. Recent visiting artists and lecturers have included Anna Sui, Oliver Stone, Sally Mann, Janine Antoni, Stefan Sagmeister, Ernesto Neto, Maira Kalman, Daniel Handler, Philip Glass, Robert Wilson, Cory Doctorow, Temple Grandin, Matthew Ritchie, Michael Moore, Paula Scher, Bob Mankoff, Marina Abramović, Theo Jansen, Sir Ken Robinson, Cheech Marin, Trimpin, Chip Kidd, Mariko Mori, Peter Chung, Wangechi Mutu, Natasha Tsakos, Laurie Anderson, DJ Spooky, and Pussy Riot. The Distinguished Visitors Series takes place at the historic Michigan Theater in downtown Ann Arbor.

== Facilities ==
The Penny W. Stamps School of Art & Design maintains several facilities devoted to the practice of creative work. The main facility is located on North Campus, within the University of Michigan's 70,000 sq ft (6,500 m^{2}) Art and Architecture Building, which is shared with the Taubman College of Architecture and Urban Planning. North Campus is also home to the School of Music, Theater & Dance, the College of Engineering, the Duderstadt Center, Pierpont Commons, and Maya Lin's Wave Field. The main facility includes studios in clay, fibers, hot and cold metals, painting, drawing, physical computing, print media (digital/hand/photographic), sculpture, video and wood. Individual undergraduate studios in the main facility are assigned to all seniors in the BFA program, while full-time faculty members and graduate students are provided with individual studios in off-site buildings.
