= Makwenda =

Makwenda is a surname. Notable people with the surname include:

- Jessica Makwenda (born 2005), Malawian Olympic swimmer
- Mbiya Makwenda, D.R.Congo runner, entrant in 2003 IAAF World Cross Country Championships – Men's short race
- Joyce Jenje-Makwenda, archivist or historian, speaker in 2017 in University of Michigan's Penny Stamps Distinguished Speaker Series
