= Léviathan Thot =

Léviathan Thot

Léviathan Thot is an art installation by the Brazilian artist, Ernesto Neto of 2006.

It was first displayed in Europe at 'le Panthéon', Paris, during an exhibition which lasted from 15 September to 31 December 2006, as part of the 'Festival D'Automne à Paris'.

It was well received during its display, gaining the artist a greater international reputation, as well as earning him the medal of Chevalier de L'Ordre des Arts et des Lettres.

It can be understood as Neto's rendering or interpretation of the Old Testament sea serpent, Leviathan, as described in the book of Job.

== Related links ==
Exhibition Program
