= David Chung (artist) =

American contemporary artist

Y. David Chung
- Born: 1959 (age 66–67); Bonn, Germany
- Education: University of Virginia; Corcoran School of the Arts and Design; George Mason University
- Website: http://www.davidchung.com/

Y. David Chung (born 1959) is a German-born American contemporary artist, and educator, he is of Korean-descent. He serves as the director of the MFA program at Penny W. Stamps School of Art & Design, associated with the University of Michigan. The focus of his work is Korean identity and various types of diasporas. Chung is known for paintings, drawings, printmaking, art installations, public art, and performances.

== Biography ==
Y. David Chung was born in 1959 in Bonn, Germany. He is of Korean descent, his parents migrated after World War II. His mother was from Kaesong, and his father was from a small town outside Pyŏngyang. In the early 1970s, Chung and his family moved to the United States, eventually settling in Washington D.C.

He studied at the University of Virginia, and received his B.F.A. degree from the Corcoran School of the Arts and Design in 1988. He received his M.F.A. degree from George Mason University.

== Career ==
Chung has been a visiting artists at a number of universities including Duke University, UC Berkeley, Wellesley College, Williams College, and Virginia Commonwealth University. Before returning to school to receive his MFA, Chung was artist-in-residence at Houston-based Project Row Houses in 1996.

After receiving his M.F.A., Chung has held faculty positions at George Mason University and in the Department of Art and Visual Technology and at Penny W. Stamps School of Art & Design at University of Michigan. In 2013, he was a visiting professor at the department of Visual and Environmental Studies at Harvard University.

== Artwork ==
In an article by Rick Lowe for Fresh Talk/Daring Gazes, he discusses Chung's piece Third Ward Jungle and writes that Chung's process in performance work addresses important aspects of integrating art in society. Lowe also comments on the fact that while Chung is the primary performer in his pieces (referring to drawing performances), it is evident that the audience takes on a large role. In addition to his performance based works, Chung has also completed a number of public works.

In 1988, exhibited Seoul House (Korean Outpost) a multimedia installation and performance at the Washington Project for the Arts. Chung worked in collaboration with the artists Pooh Johnson and Chuck Toberman. The electronic rap opera and drawing installation was inspired by Korean-owned grocery stores in predominantly Black neighborhoods in America. The work was presented again in 1990 for the The Decade Show: Frameworks of Identity at the Studio Museum in Harlem which was curated by Thelma Golden. In 1991, Chung also presented the performance in Los Angeles.

In 1998, Chung created a large-scale mosaic in P.S. 24 in Brooklyn, New York depicting daily life of Sunset Park that was sponsored by the Board of Education. In 2000, Chung created a panoramic mural for the Rosslyn Metro Station depicting the Virginia urban landscape.

Chung's work is in public museum collections including the New Museum, and the Whitney Museum of American Art.

== Awards ==
Chung has received a National Endowment of the Arts Fellowship, the Washington Mayor's Art Award, a Lila Wallace-Reader's Digest Fund Artist at Giverny Fellowship, the Rosebud Best in Show Film and Video Award, the Artslink Collaborative Project Fellowship in Kazakhstan, and the Best Documentary Film Award from the National Film Board of Canada.

== External Resources ==
- Y. David Chung papers, circa 1980-2014 at the Smithsonian's Archives of American Art
- Performance of Seoul House (Korean Outpost) at the Studio Museum in Harlem in 1990
- Cross-Currents: East Asian History and Culture Review interview with Y. David Chung
