= Matt Kenyon =

New media artist (born 1977)

Matthew Kenyon
- Born: 1977 (age 48–49)
- Known for: New Media Art
- Notable work: Consumer Index, Improvised Empathic Device (I.E.D.), The Notepad, Supermajor, Spore 1.1, Tardigotchi

Matthew Kenyon (born 1977) is an American new media artist and director of the art practice, S.W.A.M.P. (Studies of Work Atmosphere and Mass Production). Kenyon focuses on critical themes addressing global corporate operations, mass media, military-industrial complexes, and the liminal area between reality and artificial life.

== Biography ==
Matthew Kenyon received his BFA from Southeastern Louisiana State University in 1999 and his MFA from Virginia Commonwealth University in 2002. He is currently the director of the graduate program at the University at Buffalo department of art. He was previously associate professor of art at the University of Michigan's Penny W. Stamps School of Art & Design and associate professor at the Rhode Island School of Design (RISD).

In 1999, Kenyon founded S.W.A.M.P. with fellow artist Douglas Easterly. The pair operated S.W.A.M.P. as a collaborative partnership until 2012, when Kenyon assumed full creative direction of the practice. Their work, The Notepad (2007) is in the permanent collection at the Museum of Modern Art (MoMA).

In 2015, Kenyon was awarded fellowships at TED and the Macdowell colony.

== Select exhibitions ==
- 2015: GLOBALE: Infosphere, ZKM | Museum of Contemporary Art Karlsruhe, Germany
- 2015: TED Global, Vancouver, Canada
- 2015: Illusion, Science Gallery, Petrosains Science Centre, Kuala Lumpur, Malaysia
- 2014: State of Emergency, Van Every Gallery, Belk Visual Arts Center at Davidson College, North Carolina
- 2013: (In)Habitation, Museum of Contemporary Art Detroit (MoCAD). Detroit, Michigan
- 2012: Flash Crash, Katzen Arts Center, Washington D.C.
- 2012: In Search of the Miraculous, SIGGRAPH Art Gallery, Los Angeles.
- 2011: Talk to Me, The Museum of Modern Art, (MoMA). New York City.
- 2010: FILE Prix 2010, Centro Cultural FIESP, São Paulo, Brazil
- 2009: End of Oil, Exit Art, A project of SEA (Social-Environmental Aesthetics), New York City
- 2006: FILE 2006 International Symposium of Electronic Language, São Paulo, Brazil
