= Nick Tobier =

American Artist, Designer and College Professor

- Born: United States
- Occupations: Artist, designer and academic

Academic background
- Education: Bachelor of Arts; Master of Fine Arts
- Alma mater: Swarthmore College; Bard College; Harvard Graduate School of Design

Academic work
- Institutions: University of Michigan; NYSCC at Alfred

Nick Tobier is an American artist, designer and an academic. He is a Professor at the Penny W. Stamps School of Art & Design at the University of Michigan.

Tobier is most known for his participant-observation of public spaces, eventually transforming them into hubs of social connection and interaction. His work has been featured at venues including the Prague Quadrennial, Split Biennial, the Venice Biennial of Architecture, Museum of Contemporary Art Detroit, the Chicago Cultural Center, and the Smithsonian. For his work, he has received grants from various institutions, including the National Endowment of Arts and the Graham Foundation for Advanced Studies in the Fine Arts . He is the author of publications, including, with Juliane Stiegele, Utopia Toolbox: An Incitement to Radical Creativity, Parking Lot Theater, and Looping Detroit: A People Mover Travelogue, and the recipient of the 2009 Ernest Lynton Award.

== Education ==
Tobier earned a Bachelor of Arts in History and Art from Swarthmore College in 1989, followed by a Master of Fine Arts from the Milton Avery Graduate School of the Arts at Bard College in 1997. From 1996 to 1998, he also studied landscape architecture at the Harvard Graduate School of Design.

== Career ==
Tobier transitioned from a traditional studio practice to creating art in public spaces early in his career. Before joining the University of Michigan's Stamps School of Art & Design in 2003, he spent four years as an assistant professor at the NYSCC (New York State College of Ceramics) School of Art at Alfred. Along with Bart Eddy, he co-founded the Brightmoor Maker Space in Detroit in 2009. He has worked as Senior Counsel to the Provost on Faculty Civic Engagement at the University of Michigan. Furthermore, he has also served as Faculty Leader in Residence at the Edward R. Ginsberg Center for Community Service Learning. Additionally, he is a professor at the Penny W. Stamps School of Art & Design at the University of Michigan.

== Media coverage ==
Tobier has garnered media attention, with his work being featured in online publications, including Urban Omnibus, Infinite Mile, and Juliet Magazine.

== Works ==
Tobier's projects often encourage engagement and dialogue. His notable works include F.O.O.D. (Field of Our Dreams/Detroit), a mobile produce business, and Public Transportation Works, which integrated custom-made uniforms and actions into spaces like Detroit Local, Grand Rapids Streetcar, and 22 Fillmore to offer ceremonial encounters with commuters. His street-scale projects, such as All-Nite Tetherball at Dlectricity and a tricycle-powered chandelier highlighted themes of movement, sustainability, and the transformative power of light. His performance-based works, including A Band to Welcome Spring, Mascot for the Revolutions, Marches for Cars and Passers-by, and Marvelous Guests—the latter also screened at The Kitchen in New York City.

Tobier, along with Roland Graf and Michael Flynn transformed a section of a broken sidewalk in Detroit's Brightmoor neighborhood into a running, play, and exercise track. With Roland Gräf, he created Red Crossing, which features a red walkway designed to function as a cross between a life-saving net and a ceremonial walkway, allowing pedestrians to elevate a few feet above the ground. This concept was one of three selected for the 2019 Winnipeg Design Festival PROTO and was also showcased at the Magic Land Community Center in Ulaanbaatar, Mongolia. Additionally, Red Crossing has been presented internationally, including in London at Now Play This and Augsburg, Germany, supported by the Goethe Institute's Cities Ahead program, at the University of Bolzano, Italy and in the 2024 Split Biennial in Croatia. In 2023, he collaborated with Nomadic Red Corner resident artists to transform a decommissioned bus into a community workplace, the Bus Art Studio.

=== Selected group exhibitions and performances ===
- Peripheral City, Red Dive, Lower Manhattan, New York, US (2005)
- Traversing Tableaux, Modern Fuel, Kingston, Canada (2006)
- The Tent Show, Kunsthalle Nicolaj, Copenhagen, Denmark (2007)
- Rebranding Acts, Prague Contemporary Art Festival, Prague, Czech Republic (2008)
- The Sandwich Box Project, Overgaden Institute for Contemporary Art, Copenhagen, Denmark (2008)
- ArtWork/US: A National Conversation on Art, Labor & Politics, traveled from Mess Hall Gallery 400, Chicago, IL, to Regina Miller Gallery, Pittsburgh, PA; CentralTRAK, Dallas, TX; and Cell Space, San Francisco, CA (2010).
- Club 57, Museum of Modern Art, MOMA, NY (2017)
- Free City, Flint Public Art Project, Flint, MI (2017)
- Future Ready, Anchorage Museum of Art (2020)
- What Remains, dfBrL8R, Chicago (2020)
- who cares, Museum of Textile and Industry, Augsburg, Germany (2021)
- Actual Size Biennial, Galerie Camille, Detroit, US (2023)
- Kombiteks: Spomenik Radnicima, KRAK, Bihac, Bosnia (2024)
- Venice Biennial of Architecture, (2025)

=== Selected solo exhibitions and performances ===
- 22 Fillmore, City|Space, San Francisco, US (2006)
- Small Cascade for a Large City, wade, Toronto, ON (2006)
- Play/GROUNDS, Parkdale Liberty, Toronto, Canada (2007)
- Garden Party With Interruption, Le Petit Versailles, New York, US (2009)
- North End System, Building Movement, Detroit, US (2012)
- Brightmoor Bikes, Museum of Contemporary Art Detroit / MOCAD, Detroit, US (2013)
- Public Lettering, Incident Report, Hudson, NY (2014)
- Music Box Marching Band, American Museum of Art, Smithsonian Institution, Washington, DC (2013)
- Front Roof (with Brent Fogt) Terrain, Chicago (2015)
- Marvelous Guests, Public ONE + Exuberant Politics, Iowa City, US (2014)
- All the Brooms, dfBrL8r, Chicago, US (2020)
- Small Buildings, Bengaluru, India (2022)
- Tender Force, JEM / Justin Edward Moore Gallery, New York, US (2023)
- Red Crossing, 42. Splitski Salon, Split, Croatia

== Awards and honors ==
- 2009 – Ernest Lynton Award
- 2012 – Harpo Funding, Harpo Foundation
- 2022 – Graham Foundation Grant to Individual Artists
- 2023 – Project Screening at Cities Ahead, Goethe Institute
- 2024 – Zvono Award, juror, KRAK Center for Contemporary Art

== Selected books ==
- Utopia Toolbox: An Incitement to Radical Creativity (2015) ISBN 9783981673128
- Looping Detroit: A People Mover Travelogue (2016) ISBN 9781607853794
