= Denis Diderot House of Enlightenment =

Museum in Langres, France

- La Maison des Lumières Denis Diderot
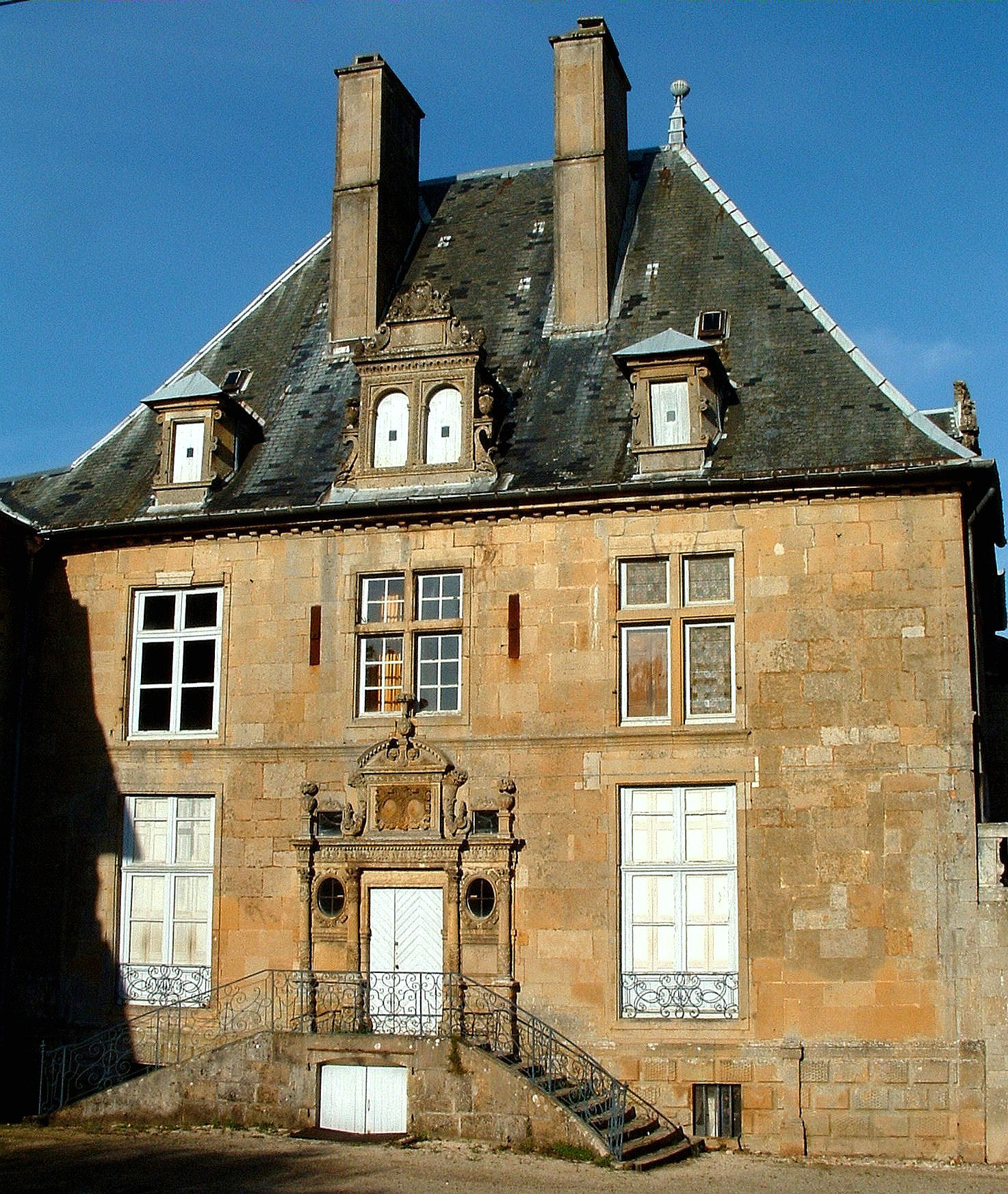
- Established: October 5, 2013
- Location: 1, place Pierre Burelle 52200 Langres
- Coordinates: 47.8668°N 5.3343°E
- Website: musees-langres.fr

The House of Enlightenment, Denis Diderot or La Maison des Lumières Denis Diderot (MLDD) is a museum dedicated to Denis Diderot, the French philosopher, writer, and art critic, as well as his Encyclopédie, ou Dictionnaire raisonné des sciences, des arts et des métiers. It is housed in the Hotel du Breuil de Saint Germain, located in Langres (Champagne-Ardenne region of France), built in the sixteenth century and rebuilt in the eighteenth century.

The museum was designed by Atelier à Kiko and the garden by landscape architect Louis Benech.

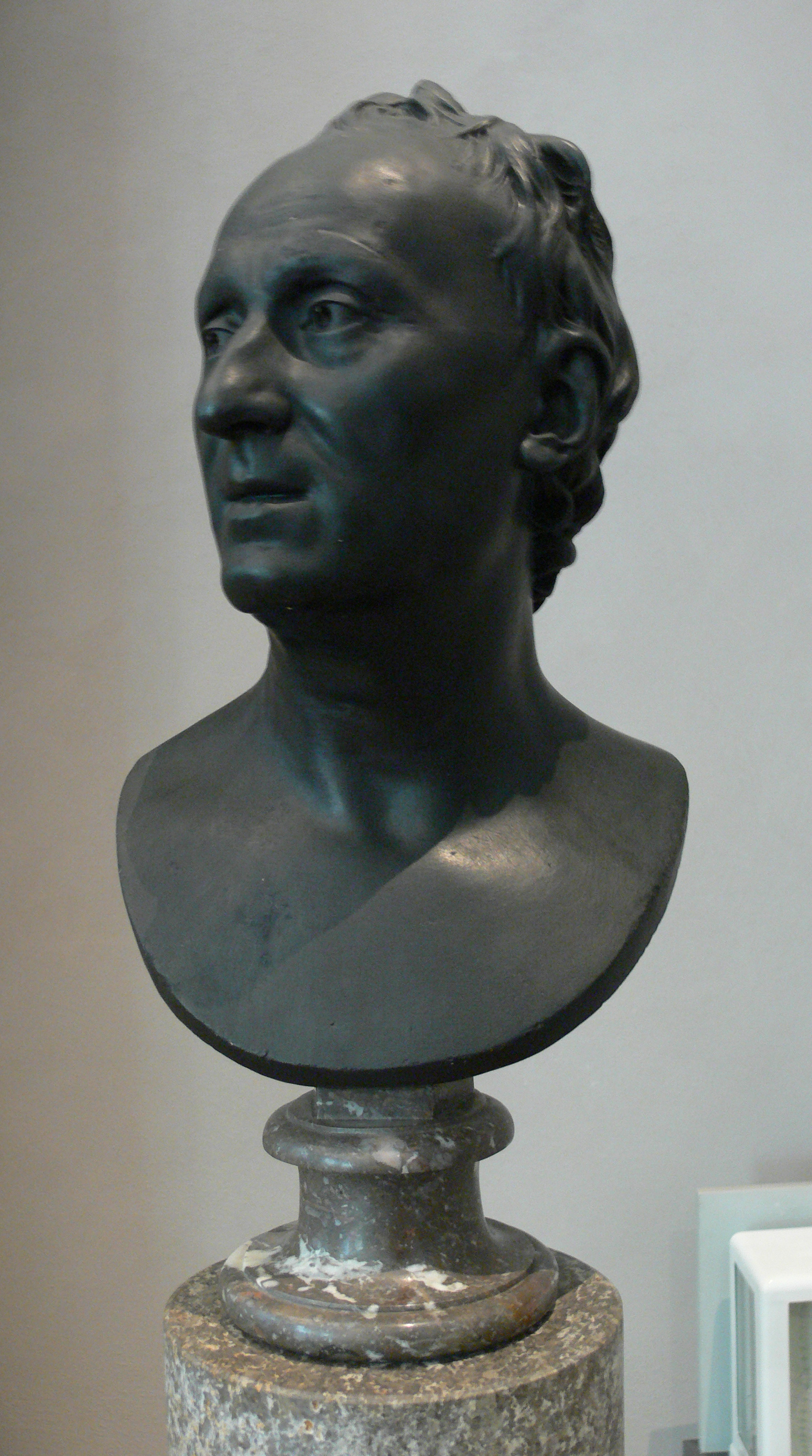
Plaster cast bust of Denis Diderot by Jean-Antoine Houdon, Paris 1780. Original in Bavarian National Museum Munich

The house is organized into 10 themed rooms, or salles, including a chronology of the Enlightenment, Denis Diderot in Langres and his later life in Paris, Diderot's journey to Russia, Diderot and art criticism, theater criticism, Diderot and music, the Encyclopedia.

== General Information ==
The museum is open all year, Tuesdays–Sundays. The explanations of the exhibits are not multilingual but an audio guide, Diderot et sa ville, is available in Dutch, English, French or German (2013).
