= Asad Raza (artist) =

American artist

- Born: Buffalo, New York, US
- Education: Johns Hopkins University
- Website: https://www.asadrazas.com/

Asad Raza (2015)

Asad Raza is an American artist who lives and works in New York, New York, and Berlin, Germany. He "creates dialogues and rejects disciplinary boundaries in his work, which conceives of art as a metabolic, active encounter that is participatory, and engages with all of the human senses."

== Life and education ==
Asad Raza was born in 1974 in Buffalo, New York to Pakistani immigrant parents, and studied literature at Johns Hopkins University from 1992-1996 and filmmaking at the Tisch School of Arts in 1993. He also studied literature at NYU, where he helped organize the 2005 graduate student strike. From 2005-2010, Raza wrote frequently about tennis for various magazines and newspapers.

== Work ==
Asad Raza's practices encompass artistic projects, collaborations, curatorial work and his work, and he is described as "one of the most interesting crossroads figures in our sometimes rigid panorama."

Raza's works often respond to a particular environment in a site-specific manner. For example, in Root sequence. Mother tongue, created for the 2017 Whitney Biennial, trees in boxes were brought into the museum. Another example of this is his piece Untitled (plot for dialogue). Here, Raza installed a tennis court inside the 16th century church of San Paolo Converso in Milan.

== Selected projects ==
=== Prehension ===
Raza’s installation for Manifesta 15 works with the removal of the Three Chimneys’ window panes, giving form to the wind Xaloc (Sirocco), which crosses the Mediterranean from the African continent. The wind "blows through the space, activating long drapes of white fabric that rhythmically dance in with air: truly mesmerizing."

=== Diversion ===
In 2022, in a piece called Diversion, Asad Raza rerouted the Main River to flow through Kunsthalle Portikus in Frankfurt. Visitors to the piece were invited to step into the water, which had been filtered. They were then offered the water to drink once it had been re-filtered and remineralised. Writing in Artforum, Elise Shar stated that "[t]he redirected river provided a powerful antidote to conventional exhibition practice, giving rise to a display conceived as active and ever changing. Neither buoying up nor washing away the past, the piece embodied a constant remaking of materiality, connecting visitors with each other and with the whole world of living and nonliving things." In 2025, Diversion was named number 31 of the 100 best artworks of the 21st century by Artnews: "It was at once a mind-blowing feat and an extremely simple gesture. Beyond that, Diversion was galvanizing for the way it made survival and reconnecting with nature seem well within reach."

=== Absorption ===
In 2019 Raza created the 34th Kaldor Public Art Project in Sydney, Australia. His work, entitled Absorption, entailed the creation of 300 tonnes of "neo-soil" made from waste products and other materials found in Sydney. This filled an entire building at the Carriageworks art institution, and was given away to visitors. According to the Sydney Morning Herald, the work "dramatises the differences between art and science, but it also shows us what they have in common...Artists, like scientists, are constantly pushing back the frontiers of the thinkable. By creating a work from soil, Raza is making a clear statement of ecological intent."

=== Untitled (plot for dialogue) ===
Asked to create a show for CONVERSO, Raza "installed a clay tennis court in a desacralised 16th-century church in Milan" complete with flooring, lines, netting, racquets, iced jasmine tea, scent and coaches for a tennis-like game. The piece was described as "plac[ing] the experience of play above the purely visual appreciation, as the back-and-forth of tennis exchanges produces meditative beauty through actions never to be repeated."

=== Root sequence. Mother tongue ===
Created for the 2017 Whitney Biennial, Root sequence. Mother tongue was composed of "26 young, often flowering trees facing the flickering light of the city", human caretakers, and objects belonging to the caretakers, as well as a scent created by Raza's sister, the perfumer and artist Alia Raza. The piece ran for 4 months, and included a curatorial element, the Weekend Guests series, in which Raza invited choreographers, musicians, poets and scholars to conduct events inside the installation, including Manthia Diawara, Moriah Evans, Dan Graham, Gayatri Chakravorty Spivak, Andros Zins-Browne, and others. The piece was shown for a second time at the Rockbund Museum, Shanghai, in September–October 2017.

=== home show ===
The Home Show was a hybrid artistic and curatorial exhibition held in Raza's own apartment. For the show, he asked thirty artists he knew to contribute objects, instructions, rituals: Carsten Höller contributed "a dream-activating toothpaste" and Rachel Rose edited all of his possessions. Raza also included items from family members and his life. Raza gave a tour to each visitor for the show's five weeks, executing the instructions and rituals each day.

=== Schema for a school ===
Schema for a school takes the form of "an experimental school" that considered new models for teaching and learning, through a series of relevant thoughts and actions drawn from sociology, philosophy, cooking, choreography, literature, and other forms of awareness. Raza was influenced by Dan Graham's Schema (1966), a work that describes its own attributes according to strict rules every time it is reproduced. Schema is an adaptive protocol, a responsive script, and its form is a model for the pedagogical schemata the school will use. The school first took place in Ljubljana, Slovenia in 2015, with further iterations at the Villa Empain in Brussels and Palais de Tokyo in Paris in 2016, and it is next scheduled for New York's The Shed in 2018.

=== There is no east or west ===
Raza's project animated the streetlights running up a hillside promenade in Ljubljana, playing a visual song visible from many parts of the city. Coming on with the streetlights at dusk and running until dawn, the piece lasted the duration of the 2015 Graphic Art Biennial, turning the cityscape into an animated graphic artwork. Raza says he was influences by blinking lights visible across the Bosphorus in Istanbul.

=== Minor History ===
Minor History is a portrait in film of Wahid Mohammed, Asad Raza's 90 year-old uncle who lives in Buffalo, New York. The film premiered on January 27, 2019 at International Film Festival Rotterdam.

== Collaborations ==
=== Home Cooking ===
In March 2020, Raza began a collaborative project known as Home Cooking, a digital artist-run space with collaborators Marianna Simnett, Dora Budor, Prem Krishnamurthy, Precious Okoyomon. Presenting works, conversations and interviews, Home Cooking was a way of presenting new work within a coronavirus reality.

=== Villa Empain ===
From 2016-2017, Raza served as the artistic director for the Villa Empain, Brussels. There he co-curated the shows Mondialité with Hans Ulrich Obrist, Décor with Dorothea von Hantelmann and Tino Sehgal, Répétition with Nicola Lees, and Seeing Zen with Felix Hess and John Stevens.

=== Solaris Chronicles ===
For this show, curated by Liam Gillick, Hans Ulrich Obrist, and Philippe Parreno, Raza collaborated with Parreno and Sehgal to create a dramaturgical presentation of the architectural models of Frank Gehry, which were placed on wheeled tables and moved in a choreographic ballet.

=== A stroll through a fun palace ===
For this show curated by Hans Ulrich Obrist, Raza and Sehgal created a dramaturgical presentation of the archives of Lucius Burkhardt and Cedric Price.

=== Collaborations as producer/dramaturge ===
From 2010-2015, Raza collaborated frequently with Tino Sehgal, serving as the producer for Sehgal's major exhibition at the Guggenheim Museum in New York. His closest collaborations with Sehgal came in 2011-12, with the works Ann Lee first shown at the Manchester International and These associations, which Raza and Sehgal developed in London and Manchester over two years. According to the Guardian, "[s]everal hundred participants" were involved in the project at the Tate, "recruited through networks of friends and acquaintances, and rehearsed by Sehgal and his producer, Asad Raza." In 2014, Raza produced and directed These associations at CCBB, Rio de Janeiro in Brazil. In 2014 Raza also realized a long-term project of bring Sehgal's works to the ancient center of Athens, Greece, with the NEON foundation, stating "When I visited the ancient sites of Athens, where commercial, cultural, social and philosophical exchange took place, where knowledge passed through and was transferred between bodies, I had the distinct feeling that the embodied and dialogical elements in Sehgal's work would have a special resonance here.”

Raza served as a dramaturge for several exhibitions with Philippe Parreno, including Park Avenue Armory, Rockbund Museum, and Jumex Museum.

=== Mayfield Depot ===
For the 2013 Manchester International Festival, Alex Poots, Hans Ulrich Obrist, Raza, and Sehgal programmed this exhibition in the disused Manchester train depot, which was a museum of dance and live art projects.

== Books ==
Raza has made several books, including Home Show, Mondialité, Décor, Seeing Zen, and Répétition.

He has also written about tennis for magazines and newspapers including the New Yorker, n+1, the New York Times, and Tennis magazine.
