= Natasha Tsakos =

- Born: Geneva, Switzerland
- Education: BFA
- Alma mater: University of Florida
- Occupations: Conceptual director, writer and performer
- Known for: Developing the concept of Technoformances
- Website: Natasha Tsakos

Natasha Tsakos is a conceptual director, interactive designer, and performance artist from Geneva, Switzerland, living in Florida. Her work explores the symbiosis of technology and live performance. She is the president and founder of NTiD inc.

== Career ==
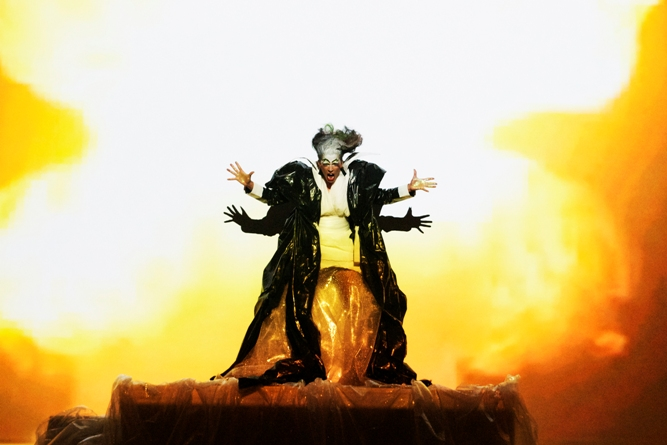
Natasha Tsakos in CLIMAX, photo by Craig Smit

Tsakos is a classically trained actor, playwright and director. She has written 12 original works, directed 30 plays, 6 commercial-length films for Ford Motors as part of the Fiesta Movement, and 2 music videos. Her work has been commissioned by Nickelodeon, Miami Art Museum, Miami Light Project, Adrienne Arsht Center, Art Basel, Discovery Channel, and featured on HBO, MTV, and BBC. Tsakos was voted one of the State of Florida's "Power Players" by Florida International Magazine in 2008. and named one of Miami's top 100 creative people by Miami New Times in 2011.

She was a member of Octavio Campos' Hybrid Theater company Camposition, and the principal character in its anti-bullying film Intention Intervention; She was also the lead performer in the roving interactive entertainment troupe Circ X, appearing in more than 10,000 events with two US national tours. Tsakos performed with Cirque du Soleil for the Super Bowl's opening ceremony in 2007 and at the Coachella Music and Arts Festival with Red Bull.

=== Technoformances ===
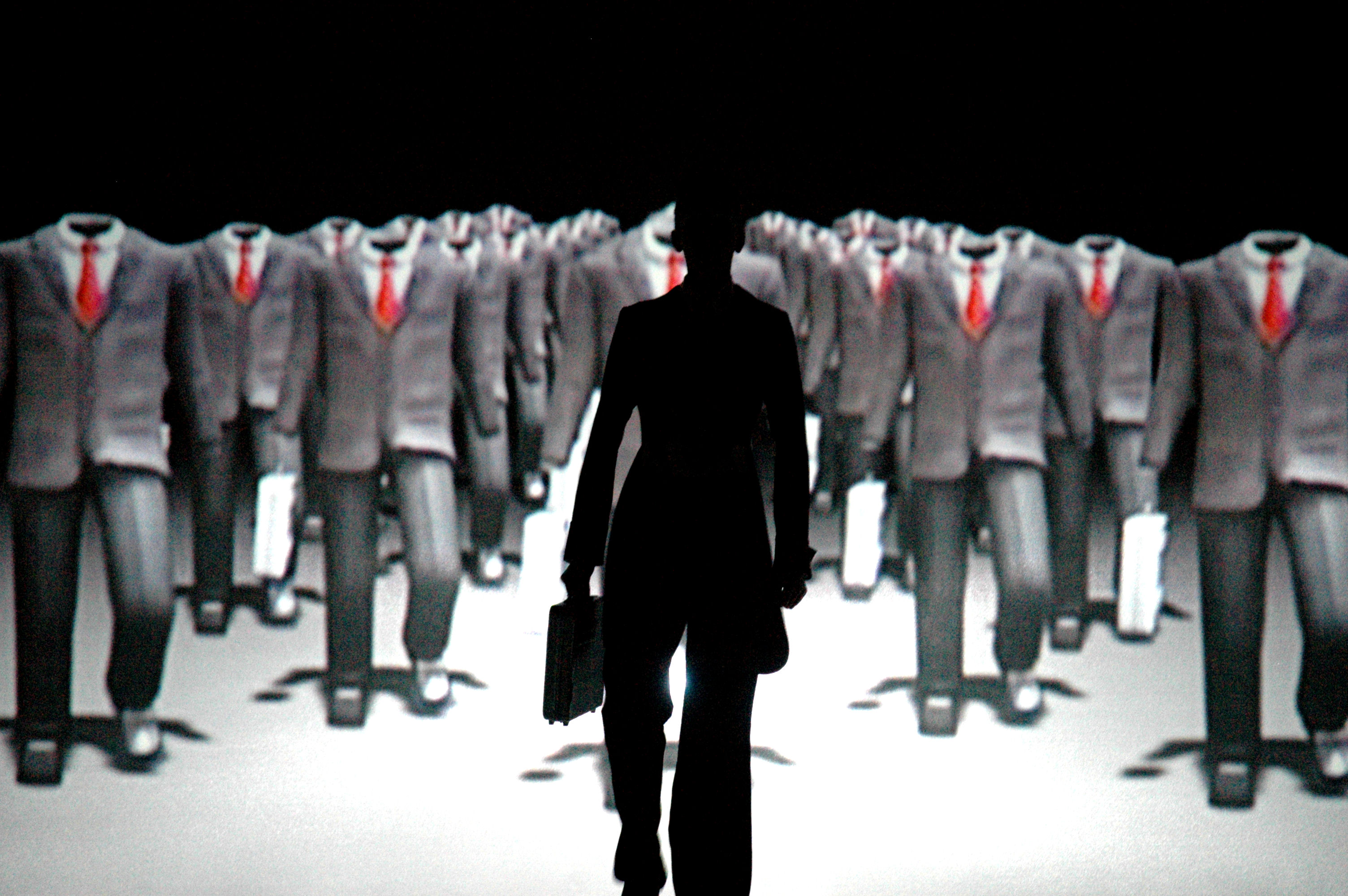
Natasha Tsakos in UP WAKE, Photo by Carolina Pagani

Tsakos' original creations have been referred to as "technoformances", which combine virtual technology, electronic music, and movement studies. The art form largely took off after her show UP WAKE, which first appeared in 2002 as a short-form dance theatre performance and was adapted into a full-length production in 2006.

UP WAKE inaugurated the Grand Opening of the Adrienne Arsht Center, formerly known as Miami Performing Arts Center, and toured globally. In the performance, Tsakos interacted with live 3D animation as her character Zero journeyed through a day of dream and wake, unable to distinguish the two. UP WAKE was named best dance performance of the year in Florida by The Sunpost; which wrote "with startling use of animation, a magical briefcase, and a movement vocabulary that ranged from MTV to avant-garde, Tsakos achieved the rarest of feats: she made a profound statement on the way we live now in an utterly original language."

A year prior to the launch of Project Natal, better known as Xbox' Kinect, Tsakos was brought on as a creative developer to work in collaboration with Digital Worlds' research department at the University of Florida to develop a new form of sensor-less motion capture technology. The preliminary phases premiered at the eComm Conference in San Francisco in April 2010 and SIGGRAPH 2010.

A year later she produced CLIMAX, a multimedia show about the environment for EcoArt Fashion Week during Art Basel. CLIMAX closed Al Gore's Climate Reality Project in 2011 and opened the G20 Summit, held in Los Cabos, Mexico in 2012.

Tsakos was commissioned again in 2012 by Miami Light Project to create a new show for its "Here and Now Festival" series. According to the Miami Herald, the technology for OMEN included "3D mapping technology in which projected animation transforms flat surfaces into fantastical yet realistic looking images". Tsakos described the phenomenon of data visualization and projection mapping applied to theatrical productions, as the "data-tainment movement".

In 2013, the Governor's School for the Arts commissioned Tsakos for its 25th anniversary to create a production that included its 355 music, dance, performing and visual arts students. The result was a full-length interdisciplinary show called ZO, following artists auditioning for a talent show. ZO premiered at the Chrysler Hall in Norfolk, Virginia. That same year, Tsakos was named a finalist in the Arts category for the World Technology Awards.

Tsakos later collaborated with Mexican media agency Circus to create the show QUARRY; a performance focused around the concept of how concrete is made, from the natural forces to the industrialization process involved. QUARRY was presented at Centro Banamex in Mexico City and incorporated a 200-foot screen set behind 15 foot cylinders, IMAG projections, and 15 performers dancing to projection mapped animation.

In 2013, Tsakos worked with the Discovery Channel to produce two theatrical pieces; SUPER INTENSO! and SUPER WOMAN which premiered at the Gotham Hall in New York City. SUPER INTENSO! later celebrated Discovery Brazil's 20th anniversary in São Paulo in 2014.

Tsakos opened the Tribeca Film Festival' Imagination Talks with her piece "FACE FORWARD: A MANIFESTO FOR THE FUTURE" and was the official host for the all-day summit, presenting speakers including Google's Captain of Moonshots, Astro Teller; the founding director of Stanford University's Virtual Human Interaction Lab, Jeremy Bailenson and Chief Entrepreneur Officer at 3D Systems, Ping Fu.

Tsakos worked in Havana, Cuba between 2014 and 2015 developing an original conception with Cuban singer Isaac Delgado and choreographer Santiago Alfonso, but the show never went into full production.

=== Public speaking ===
Tsakos has spoken at conferences such as the TED Conference in Long Beach, California, the 2009 International Symposium on Mixed and Augmented Reality, 2010 National Innovation Conference, La Ciudad de Las Ideas in 2009, 2010, and 2016, The Penny Stamp Speaker Series at the University of Michigan, the 2013 National Theatre Conference, TEDxBroadway 2014, TEDxPuraVidaJoven 2014, SIME Stockholm 2014, TEDx San Diego 2015, the 2016 NOVUS Summit at the United Nations General Assembly Hall, Google, Kellogg Innovation Network, YPO, IBM Summit, amongst others.

== Education ==
Tsakos graduated in 2000 with a BFA in Theatre from New World School of the Arts at the University of Florida. She was honored in 2016 with the Alumni Recognition Award, the first such award in New World School of the Arts history.

In 2015, Tsakos won Singularity University's Global Impact Challenge competition, and was awarded a Google grant to attend SU's Graduate Studies Program at NASA Research Park in Silicon Valley. The program focuses on accelerating technologies to address Humanity's greatest challenges. In 2017, Tsakos became the ambassador of Singularity University's Miami Chapter.

== Bibliography ==
- The Lost Architect (2013)
- Colours: a nonsense The first edition (2013)
- Colours: a nonsense The second edition (2014)
