= Chaz Maviyane-Davies =

Zimbabwean graphic designer

Chaz Maviyane-Davies (born 1952) is a Zimbabwean-born graphic designer based in Cambridge Massachusetts, the United States. Maviyane-Davies has been described by the United Kingdom's Design magazine as “the guerrilla of graphic design.” He earned a BA from Middlesex University and an MA at the Central School of Art and Design, London. He has worked in Britain, Japan, Malaysia, the United States, and Zimbabwe.

== Career ==
Due to adverse political conditions in his homeland of Zimbabwe and the confrontational nature of his work, Maviyane-Davies moved to the United States in 2001, where he became a professor of design at the Massachusetts College of Art and Design in Boston. In addition to being published in numerous books, international magazines, and newspapers, his work has been exhibited extensively and is included in several permanent collections at various galleries. He has been an invited speaker at numerous universities and creative platforms. In 2009, he was conferred an honorary doctor of humane letters degree from the University of Massachusetts, Lowell. For more than three decades the Maviyane-Davies’s powerful work has taken on issues of consumerism, health, nutrition, social responsibility, the environment and human rights. In the 1980s and 1990s, Maviyane-Davies ran a studio in Zimbabwe called The Maviyane Projects that specialised on films and graphic designs.

== Personal life ==
He is married to Chiyoko and has a daughter Djena.

== Exhibitions ==
He has exhibited his work around the globe from invitational exhibitions of posters to solo shows in China, Taiwan, South Korea, Japan, Russia, Poland, Czech Republic, Slovakia, Bulgaria, France, Ukraine, Argentina, Mexico, Brazil, England, and the Netherlands among other countries.

== Publications ==
A world of questions: 120 posters on the human condition (2015)
