= Rebekah Modrak =

American artist, writer, and educator (born 1971)

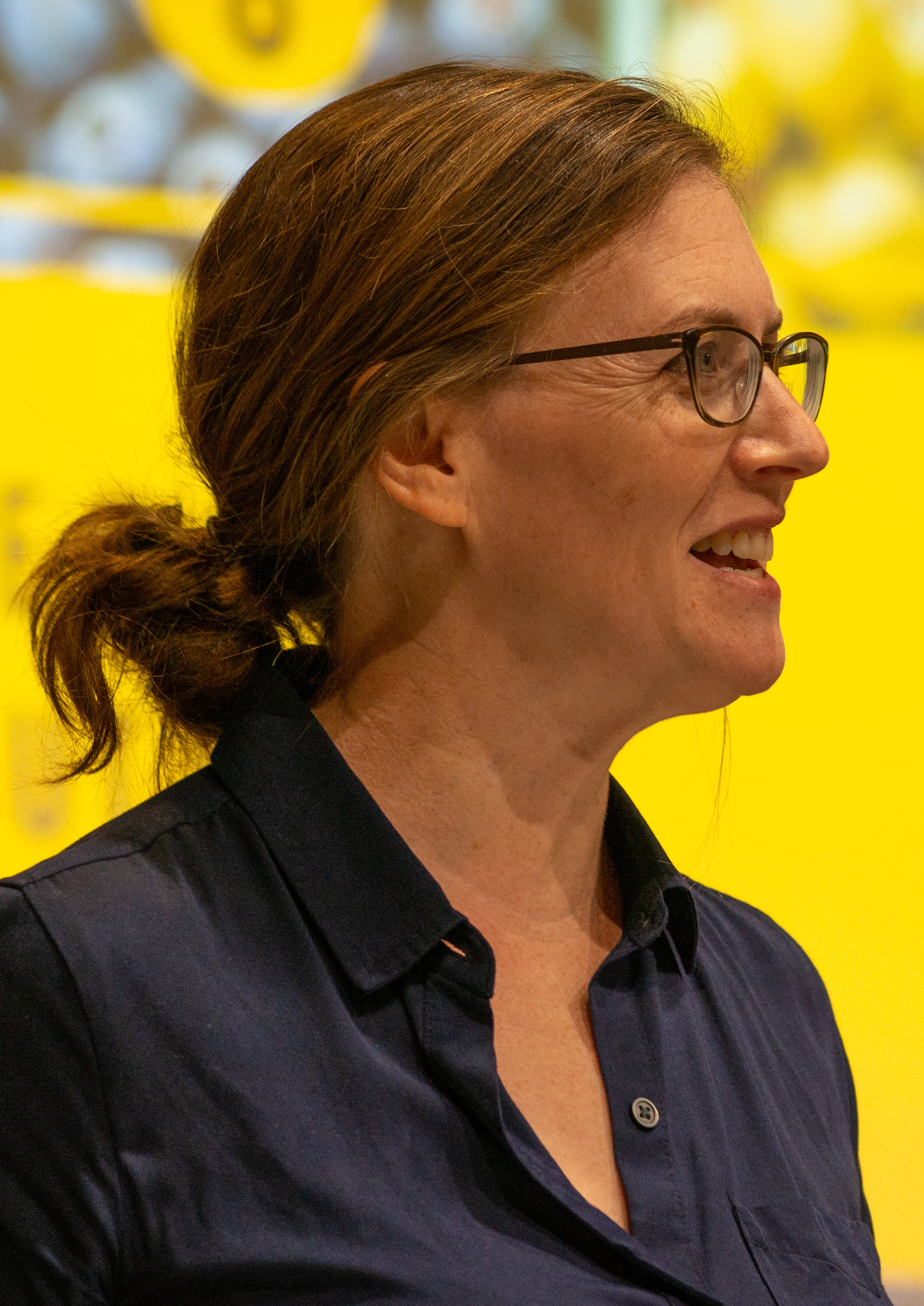
- Modrak in 2018
- Born: 1971 (age 54–55); Pittsburgh, Pennsylvania
- Education: New York State College of Ceramics at Alfred University (BFA); Syracuse University (MFA)
- Notable work: Reframing Photography, 2011
- Website: rebekahmodrak.com

Rebekah Modrak (born 1971) is an American artist, writer, and educator. She is a professor at the University of Michigan Stamps School of Art and Design.

== Early life, education, and career ==
Modrak's hometown is the Squirrel Hill neighborhood in the city of Pittsburgh, Pennsylvania.

She received a Bachelor of Fine Arts degree from the New York State College of Ceramics at Alfred University in 1992 and a Master of Fine Arts in art media studies from Syracuse University in 1996.

Modrak was a visiting artist on the faculty at Bowling Green State University in Ohio. She later joined the full-time faculty at Ohio State University, where she taught as an Associate Professor of Photography until 2003. In 2003, she joined the faculty at the University of Michigan School of Art and Design.

Rebekah Modrak's work has been exhibited at the Carnegie Museum of Art in Pittsburgh, Incident Report, and the Sculpture Center in Cleveland.

== Work ==
=== Early work ===
Rebekah Modrak's work as a visual artist involves a struggle between the expected uses of a particular technology or history and her desire to employ that knowledge or system in unintended ways that support the messier dynamics of life. Modrak's original experiments in photography led her to question how the one-point perspective of "reality through a viewfinder" presumes to represent our experience of sight. This work, incorporating photographic images applied to three-dimensional forms, ranges from a series of over life-sized figures to portrait busts. The photographic "skin" in combination with the soft three-dimensional structure it was applied to creates complex portraits of individuals, revealing empathetic character traits through sculptural position, while employing photography's descriptive potential through compound images that document the minutiae of a given sitter with the hyper detail seen through the lens as it captures not only facial expression, but visceral specifics of hair texture and skin quality. As Modrak manipulated photographs to the will of the three-dimensional creatures, she recognized a lapse between this approach to media and the available texts about photography studio practice. In 2011, Modrak published, Reframing Photography, a book that redefines photography (theory, history, and technique) as a more expansive practice utilized by various types of artists, some who do not necessarily define themselves as photographers.

=== Critical commerce ===
Modrak's work explores interests in shared concerns between art and commerce – each involving questions of labor, production and distribution. Her artworks on eBay offer recreations of historic photographs, each incorporating an implausible garment as the main event. Original Fluxus stretchy pants mentioned in the post Stolen Ebayaday presented a pair of stretchy pants that (Modrak proposed) had been worn by Yoko Ono during her Cut Piece, by VALIE EXPORT in her street gestures, and by the members of Hi Red Center during their street cleaning event. Original Vito Acconci 04:30, December 21, 2011 (UTC) parasol with photographs adds an ornamental parasol to five seminal Vito Acconci performances.

In ebayaday, Modrak along with Zack Denfeld, and Aaron Ahuvia (Professor, University of Michigan-Dearborn, School of Business) curated a month-long art exhibition featuring site-specific work by twenty-five artists, the first curated exhibition of artwork imbedded within eBay.com that uses eBay as a gallery with which to present an exhibition of artwork, instead of simply displaying and selling them.

Modrak is the artist behind the artwork Re Made Co., a web-based work (http://remadeco.org/) that appears to be an artisanal toilet plunger company, and what blogger Mark Maynard calls "a brilliant piece of satire directed at the company Best Made and its line of high-end, artisanal axes." The artwork intentionally treats browsers as potential consumers by presenting them with a fully functioning company website that mirrors Best Made's content from 2013 through 2017, complete with a collection of $350 plungers in "The Plunger Shop" (in lieu of "The Axe Shop"), brand narration of "adventures" in manual labor at a Nebraskan farm or at the campground in Plumbland (in lieu of Best Made's (Lumberland"), and enticing events for building community. In the book The Routledge Companion to Criticality in Art, Architecture, and Design, Modrak describes Re Made as "a dynamic, malleable [work], changing in real-time within the online environment. Browser posts and emails, and Best Made’s redesigns, legal actions, and product messaging compel new creative and ethical decisions: how to respond to a tobacco company’s request to feature Re Made in their digital showcase; how to correspond in a ‘manly’ way when posing as avatar Peter Smith-Buchanan; what voice to use to reply to an order for thirty Captain Perley Frazer Hudson Bay Plungers."

Re Made Co. critiques the appropriation of manual labor by affluent urban hipsters and the lumbersexual, and exposes and challenges Best Made, and the media that publicize this brand, as still promoting a version of masculinity embedded in the pioneer myth and symbolic violence. According to Professor Laurie Meamber, "The Best Made Co. brand myth is tied to the idea of the male pioneer that explores and conquers nature. As noted previously, the list of cultural referents utilized by the brand is diverse, and the Best Made Co. brand unabashedly associates well-known men with posed photos of archetypal outdoorsmen, such as fishermen and farmers, with a range of symbols such as the American flag and whiskey bottles. Examined individually, once again, the images are ripe for questioning. For example, many of the masculine, pioneering figures referenced in the brand myth may have a tenuous relationship to the outdoors (e.g. musicians, a civil rights leader). Yet, taken together, these references are viewed as a coherent brand identity that speaks to urban hipsters."

In Design Observer, journalist Rob Walker described Re Made Co. and the Re Made brand video in particular, as, "An overtly ridiculous product pitch for an artisanal plunger (fictional, of course), the clip effectively satirizes the products of a much-lauded brand called Best Made, whose flagship offering is a (nonfictional) line of really fancy and expensive axes. [It's] a very pointed, and useful, example of object-as-critique, setting off a very serious line of questioning about the ideologies and biases embedded in designed things." In "Learning to Talk Like an Urban Woodsman," Modrak reveals the only part of the Re Made website that deviates from Best Made's is the "Add to Cart" button. She writes that "any browser showing their readiness to spend money on a stylized plunger by clicking on 'Add To Cart' is dropped into the chamber of Thorstein Veblen. In this 'chamber,' staged to evoke a Re Made campfire, Veblen chronicles the activities of the gentleman of leisure who cultivates a lifestyle full of 'manly beverages and trinkets,' apparel, weapons and other goods that establish his notable taste and draw attention to his capacity (in time and money) for cultivating leisure."

=== Reframing Photography ===
Published in 2010 by Routledge, Reframing Photography, written by Rebekah Modrak with Bill Anthes, looks at the history of photography through the approach of bridging technical and theoretical concerns in a broad, all encompassing way. The book "doesn’t abstract photography from its social context, discussing issues such as censorship in military operation, the place of photography in social networks like facebook, or comparing notions of originality and reproduction in photography to the same notions in genetics, etc."

== Selected publications ==
- Radical Humility: Essays on Ordinary Acts (2021), edited by Rebekah Modrak and Jamie Vander Broek
- Trouble in Censorville: The Far Right's Assault on Public Education and the Teachers Who are Fighting Back (2024), edited by Nadine M. Kalin and Rebekah Modrak
