= Vinay Gupta =

Indian academic (born 1972)

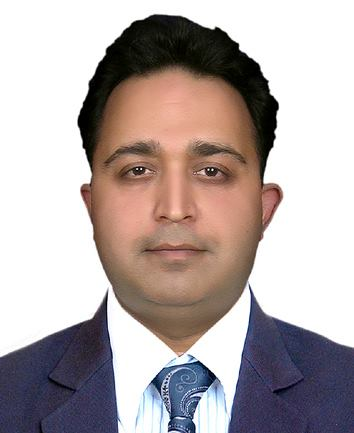
- Born: 31 March 1972 (age 54); Rajasthan, India
- Education: Government College, Ajmer; Maharshi Dayanand Saraswati University; CNRS; NPL; Kyoto University; Technische Universität Ilmenau
- Known for: Studies on organic solar cells, carbon nanotubes arrays and Förster resonance energy transfer
- Awards: 2015 Thomson Reuters Research Excellence India Citation Award & 2017 Shanti Swarup Bhatnagar Prize
- Scientific career
- Fields: Materials science
- Workplaces: Aichi Institute of Technology; Kyushu University; Hindustan Electro Graphite; Khalifa University of Science and Technology, UAE; Alan J. Heeger Lab UCSB, USA

Vinay Gupta (born 31 March 1972) is an Indian materials scientist and a former senior scientist at the Physics of Energy Harvesting department of the National Physical Laboratory of India. Known for his studies on organic solar cells, carbon nanotubes arrays and Förster resonance energy transfer, Gupta is a former Alexander von Humboldt Fellow. The Council of Scientific and Industrial Research, the apex agency of the Government of India for scientific research, awarded him the Shanti Swarup Bhatnagar Prize for Science and Technology, one of the highest Indian science awards, for his contributions to physical sciences in 2017. (Note: Long link - please select award year to see details)

== Biography ==
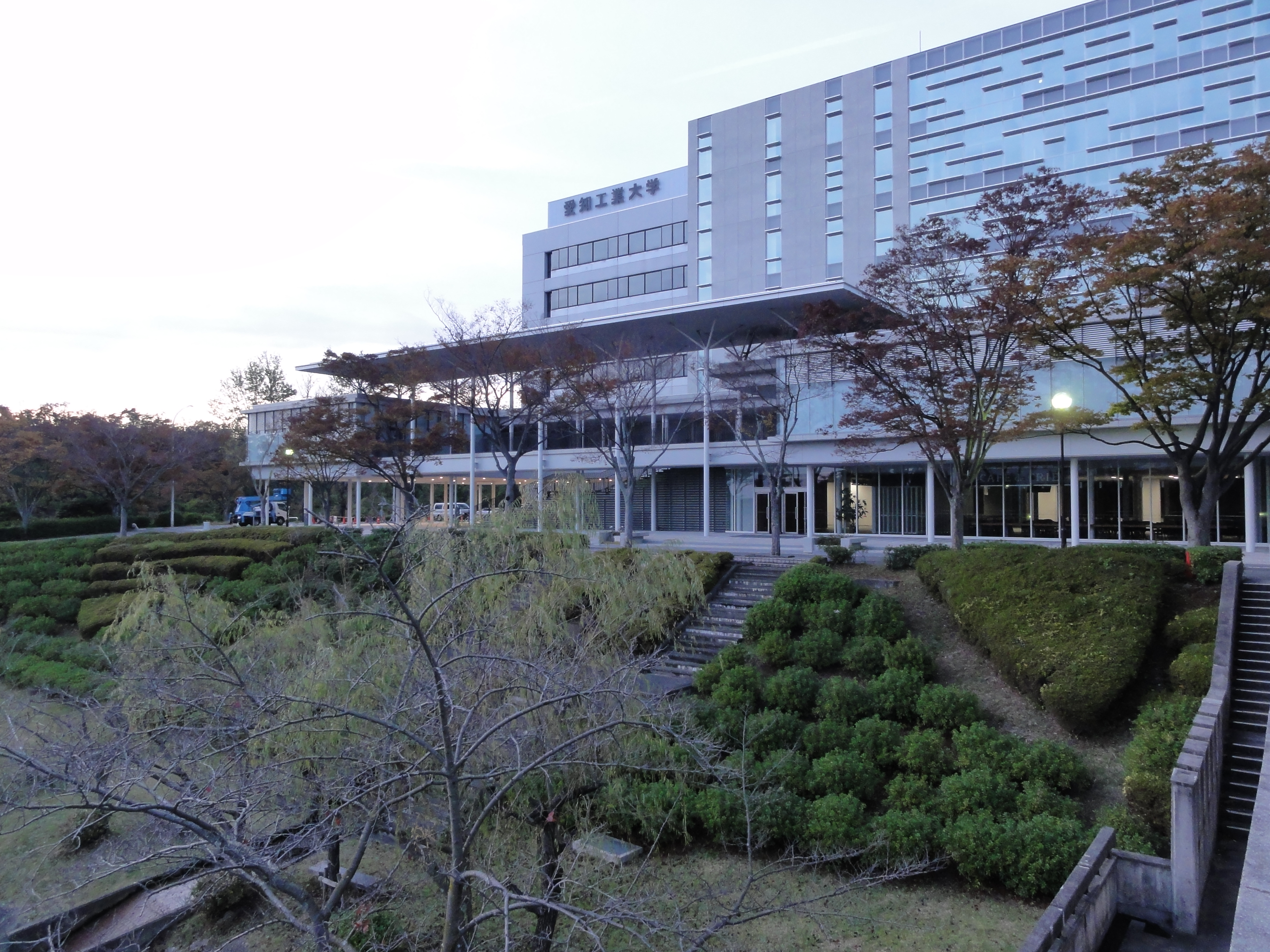
Aichi Institute of Technology

Born on 31 March 1972 in the Indian state of Rajasthan, Vinay Gupta did his higher secondary studies under the State Education Board and earned his BSc and MSc degrees from Government College, Ajmer in 1990 and 1992 respectively. Subsequently, he enrolled for his doctoral studies at Maharshi Dayanand Saraswati University, securing a PhD in 1997. His doctoral work in Transport in 2D systems were divided among two institutions, starting with CNRS during 1992–94 and later at National Physical Laboratory of India during 1995–97. He also did post-doctoral work on Lithium-ion battery at Kyoto University as a JSPS fellow between 1998 and 2000 and at Aichi Institute of Technology from 2000 to 2003. The same year, he moved to Germany as an Alexander von Humboldt Fellow at Technische Universität Ilmenau to work on carbon nanotube and graphene where he stayed till 2004. His next assignment was at Kyushu University as a visiting associate professor and he returned to India to take up the position of the deputy general manager at Hindustan Electro Graphite, Bhopal on the New Year's Day of 2008. His stint at Bhopal lasted only a week and he went back to Kyushu University to resume his duties as a visiting faculty, a post he held for two months. In June 2008, he joined his old institution, National Physical Laboratory. Following differences with the institute administration, he resigned from National Physical Laboratory in June 2018 to take up a position of Research Associate at Khalifa University. In between, he had a short stint as an Indo-US fellow at the laboratory of Alan J. Heeger, a Nobel Laureate in Physics, at the University of California, Santa Barbara from August 2012 to July 2013, and visiting professor at Shizuoka University, Japan from October 2016 to December 2016.

== Research ==
FRET Jablonski diagram

Gupta is known to have made notable contributions in the fields of organic solar cells, carbon nanotubes and Förster resonance energy transfer. His efforts are reported to have assisted in translating the science into viable technological products. His studies have been documented by way of a number of articles and ResearchGate, an online article repository of scientific articles, has listed 90 of them. (Note: Please see Selected bibliography section) He has also delivered plenary or keynote speeches at various seminars and conferences and is the coordinator of the pre-conference workshop on Thin Film Solar Cells scheduled to be held in November 2017, in connection with the "17th International Conference on Thin Films-2017 (ICTF-17)".

== Awards and honours ==
Gupta has held three major research fellowships; JSPS fellowship of the Japan Society for the Promotion of Science (1998–2000), Alexander von Humboldt Fellowship (2003–04), and Indo-US IUSSTF fellowship (2012-2013). Marquis Who's Who included his biography in their 2002–03 edition and he received a certificate of appreciation from the Japan Society for the Promotion of Science in 2002. He was listed as the highest cited author by Elsevier in 2006 and he was selected as one among the top 10 Indian scientists with the highest number of citations during the period 2010–14 by Thomson Reuters in 2015. The Council of Scientific and Industrial Research awarded Gupta the Shanti Swarup Bhatnagar Prize, one of the highest Indian science awards in 2017. The following year, he became a laureate of the Asian Scientist 100 by the Asian Scientist.

== Selected bibliography ==
- V. Gupta, N. Chaudhary, R. Srivastava, G. D. Sharma, R. Bhardwaj, S. Chand (2011). "Luminscent Graphene Quantum Dots for Organic Photovoltaic Devices". Journal of the American Chemical Society. 133 (12): 9960–9963. doi:10.1002/anie.201106566. PMID 22318942.
- Vinay Gupta, Vishal Bharti, Mahesh Kumar, Suresh Chand, Alan J. Heeger (2015). "Polymer–Polymer Förster Resonance Energy Transfer Significantly Boosts the Power Conversion Efficiency of Bulk-Heterojunction Solar Cells". Advanced Materials. 27 (30): 4398–4404. Bibcode:2015AdM....27.4398G. doi:10.1002/adma.201501275. PMID 26109435. S2CID 9354537.
- Vinay Gupta, Lai Fan Lai, Ram Datt, Suresh Chand, Alan J. Heeger, Guillermo C. Bazan, Surya Prakash Singh (2016). "Dithienogermole-based solution-processed molecular solar cells with efficiency over 9%". Chemical Communications. 52 (55): 8596–8599. doi:10.1039/C6CC03998G. PMID 27321642.

== See also ==
- Solar cell
