= Prem Krishnamurthy =

German-American designer (born 1977)

Prem Krishnamurthy (born 1977) is a designer, curator, teacher, and writer based in Berlin and New York City. He is a partner in the multidisciplinary design studio Wkshps. In 2015, Krishnamurthy was awarded Cooper Hewitt’s National Design Award for Communication Design.

== Career ==
Krishnamurthy has participated in a number of curatorial projects. He is co-artistic director of FRONT International 2021, the Cleveland triennial of contemporary art. From 2015–2018, he was a member of the creative team for the 57th Carnegie International at the Carnegie Museum of Art, Pittsburgh. He served as co-artistic director of the inaugural Fikra Graphic Design Biennial, Ministry of Graphic Design (2018, Sharjah, UAE), and co-curator of the 13th A.I.R. Biennial, Let’s try listening again (2018). He has also organized exhibitions at the Austrian Cultural Forum New York, The Jewish Museum (New York), Para Site (Hong Kong), the Canadian Centre for Architecture, and Stanley Picker Gallery at Kingston University London. In 2012, he established P!, a critically acclaimed “Mom-and-Pop-Kunsthalle” originally located in New York's Chinatown.

Previously, Krishnamurthy was co-founder of the design studio Project Projects. He has received grants and fellowships from the Graham Foundation for Advanced Studies in the Fine Arts, New York State Council on the Arts, and KW Institute for Contemporary Art. He has taught at a number of art, design, and curatorial programs worldwide, including Barnard College, Rhode Island School of Design, and Parsons School of Design. In 2019, Bard College's Center for Curatorial Studies acquired his archives from 1997 to 2017.

Krishnamurthy has published widely, including his experimental book entitled P!DF. He is associate editor of Paper Monument, a non-profit art press, and co-editor of the book Speculation, Now. Krishnamurthy is also a former board member of the non-profit magazine Triple Canopy and Vera List Center for Art and Politics.
