= Ernesto Neto =

Brazilian artist

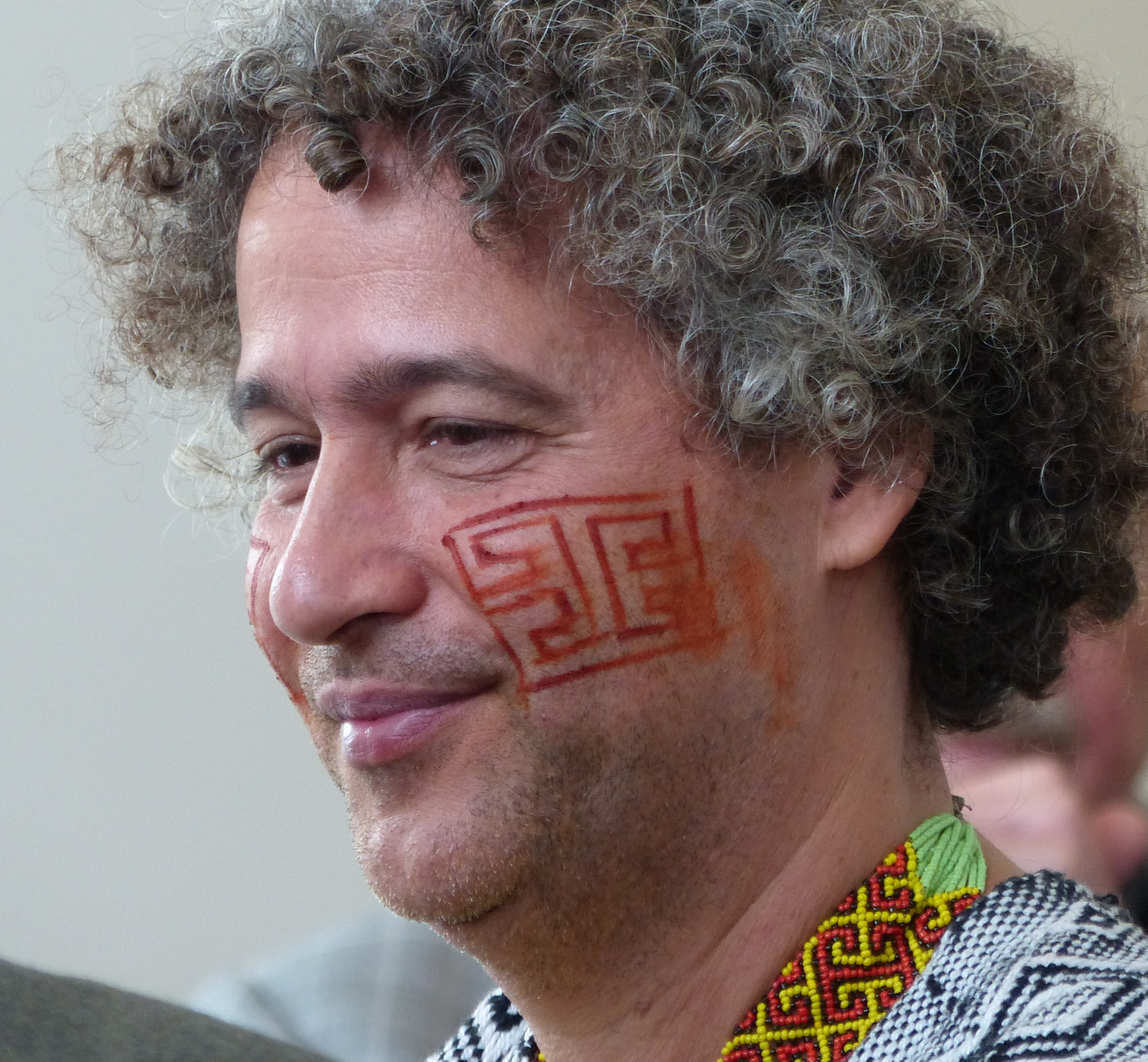
- Born: Ernesto Saboia de Albuquerque Neto; July 2, 1964 (age 61); Rio de Janeiro, Brazil
- Education: Escola de Artes Visuais do Parque Lage
- Occupation(s): installation artist, sculptor, drawer, painter
- Known for: Visual arts
- Notable work: Léviathan Thot, Anthropodino
- Awards: Chevalier des Arts et des Lettres

Ernesto Saboia de Albuquerque Neto (July 2, 1964 in Rio de Janeiro, Brazil) is a contemporary visual artist.

== Early career ==
Ernesto Neto began exhibiting in Scotland in 1988 and has had solo exhibitions abroad since 1995. He represented with Vik Muniz their country in 2001 Venice Biennale, his installations were featured in Brazil's national pavilion and in the international group exhibition at the Arsenale.

== Style ==
Léviathan Thot

Neto's work has been described as "beyond abstract minimalism". His installations are large, soft, biomorphic sculptures that fill an exhibition space that viewers can touch, poke, and walk on or through. They are made of white, stretchy material—amorphous forms stuffed with Styrofoam pellets or, on occasion, aromatic spices. In some installations, he has also used this material to create translucent scrims that transform the space's walls and floor. His sculptures can be regarded as expression of traditional abstract form, but in their interaction with the viewer, they work on another level as well.

== Exhibitions ==
In 1998, Neto exhibited a new installation Navedenga. A clear-like lycra chamber that stretched from the floor and ceiling, viewers were invited to remove their shoes and walk through it. Resembling penetrating an opening, this installation tries to connect the dependence of the viewer's experience and the work itself.

In 2006 created Léviathan Thot for an exhibition which lasted from 15 September to 31 December 2006, as part of the 'Festival D'Automne à Paris'.

Also in 2006 Neto was awarded chevalier de L'Ordre des Arts et des Lettres.

In 2009 Neto exhibited a new work at New York's Park Avenue Armory called anthropodino. Filling the 55,000-square-foot (5,100 m^{2}) hall, the aim is to help the Armory reposition itself as a big-art destination like the Turbine Hall in London's Tate Modern.

In 2018, Neto exhibited at a central train station in Zurich, Switzerland. The exhibition was titled GaiaMotherTree and consisted largely of hand-knotted cotton strips in oranges and yellows. The exhibit was created alongside the Beyeler Foundation and featured a monthlong series of workshops for both children and adults which took place beneath the exhibit. At the time of its debut, Beyeler Foundation director Sam Keller estimated that approximately a half-million people will visit the station and, consequently, the sculpture. This would have made GaiaMotherTree the most visited work of art in the history of Switzerland.

In 2019, Neto exhibited at the Tanya Bonakdar Gallery with Children of the Earth in Los Angeles, California. This solo exhibit consisted of yellows, greens, purples, and reds. The exhibit also utilized musical instruments, spices and crystals to engage all five senses.

In 2021, Neto exhibited a new work at The Museum of Fine Arts, Houston called SunForceOceanLife. This solo exhibit featured large, spiraling hand-woven materials in oranges, yellows and greens.

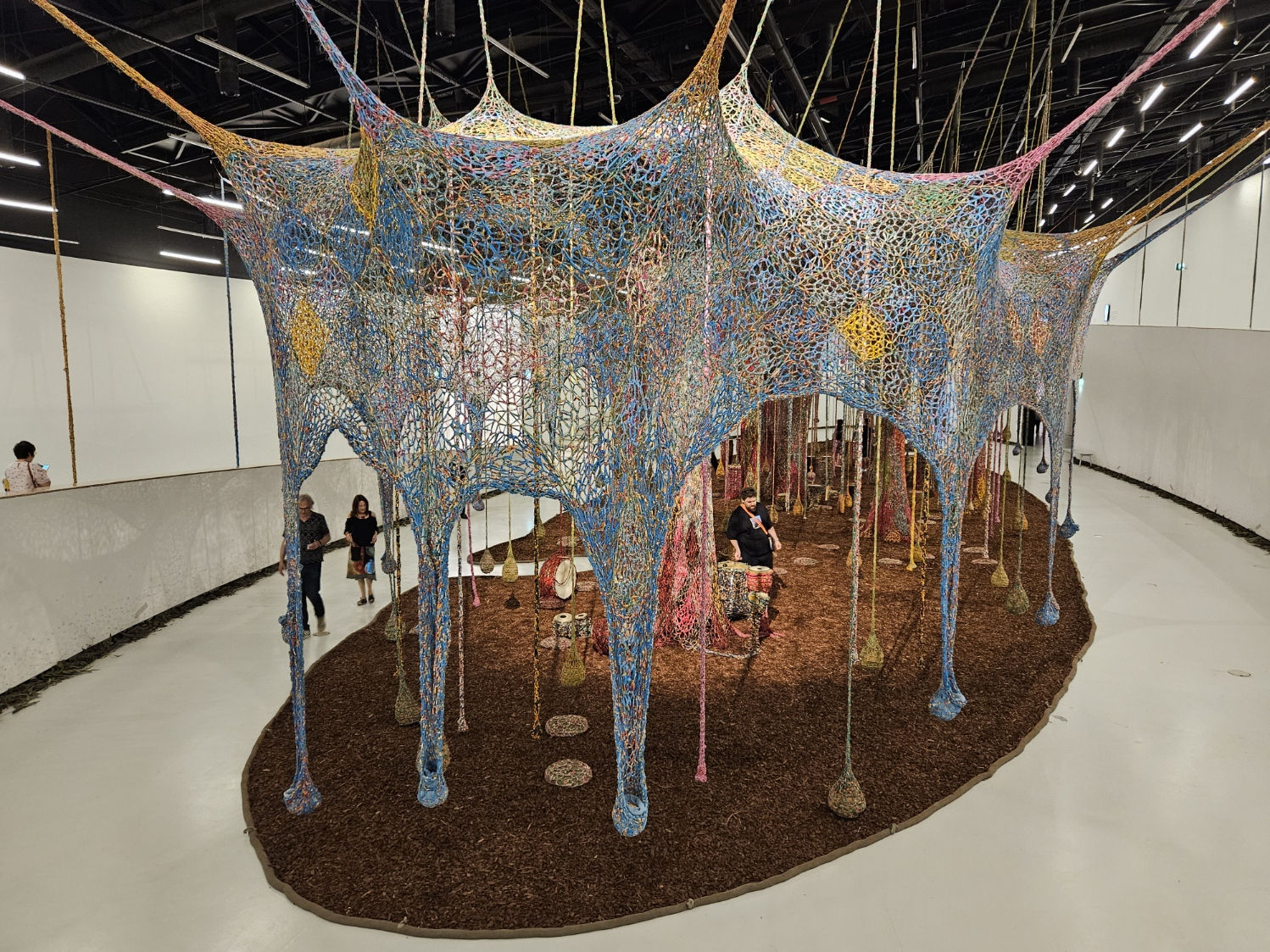
Nosso Barco Tambor Terra

In 2024, Neto exhibited at Museu of Art, Architecture and Technology in Lisbon, Nosso Barco Tambor Terra, one of his largest installations up to date. Its shape is richly imbued with history and symbolism. The sculpture, which incorporates a series of instruments, will be periodically activated by a musical programme.
