= Marije Vogelzang =

Dutch food designer

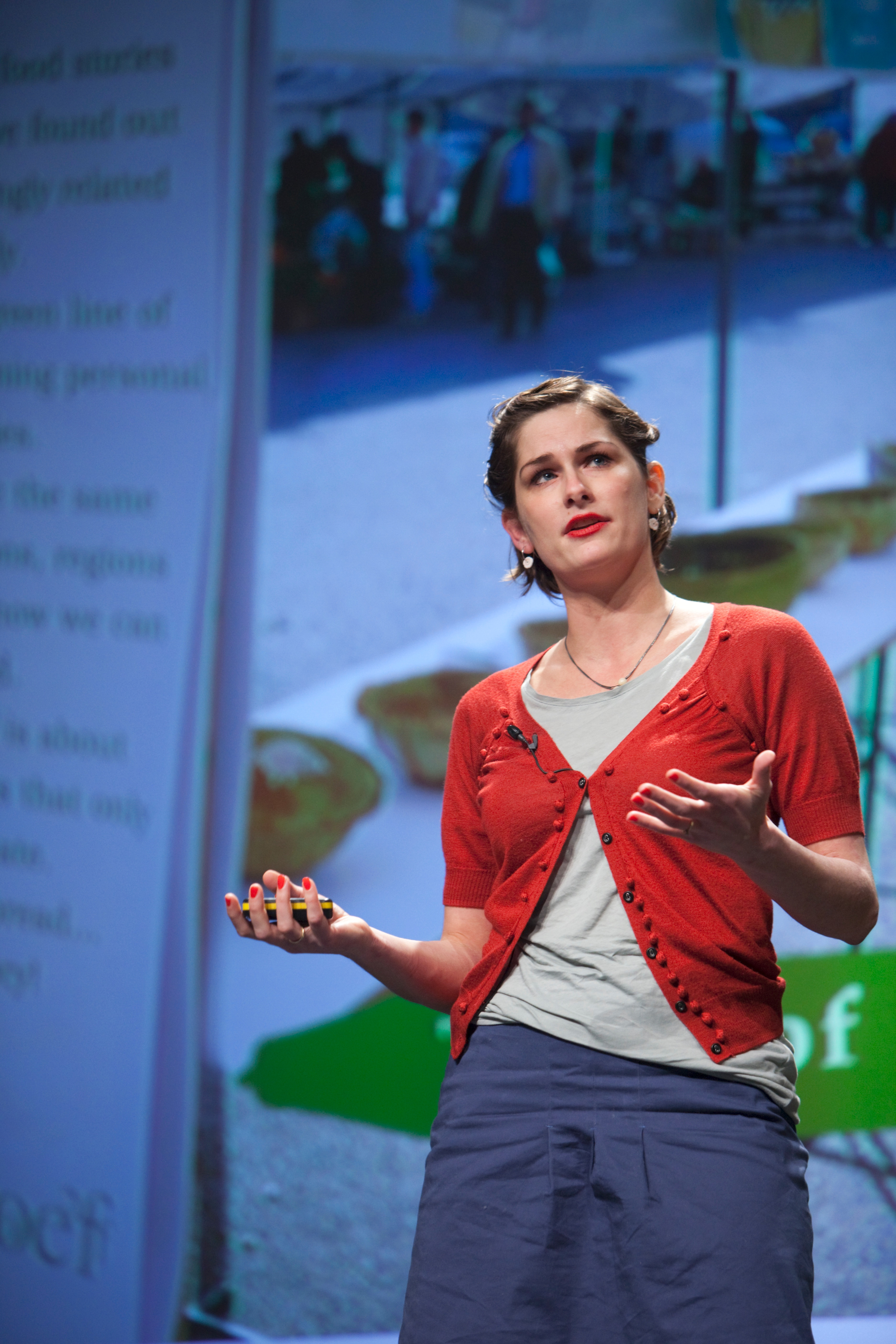
Marije Vogelzang at PopTech 2009 in Camden, Maine

Marije Vogelzang is a Dutch "Food Designer" or an "Eating Designer", to be expressed more specialized. Her name is considered among the pioneers of the field of Food Design, along with names such as Marti Guixe and Francesca Zampollo. In the late 1990s, Marije presented her "White Funeral Meal" project at the Design Academy Eindhoven, while food was not yet considered as a material for design. This project was subsequently shown at Slaone del Mobile in Milan and was featured in all kind of magazines.

During her 26 years of professional work in the field of Food Design, Marije has played a prominent role in the development of this field, both in theory and in practice. She considers the description of design as "giving shape to an idea ("Gestaulting")", focusing on how to use food for designing meaningful eating experiences that goes beyond food.

Vogelzang's significant works include Feed Love and Eat Love Budapest. They are multimedia installations that combine elements of sculpture, performance art, and interactive technology, based on the concept of feeding.

== Life and career ==
In 2000, Vogelzang graduated from Design Academy Eindhoven and started working independently with creative catering.

In 2004, Vogelzang met Piet Hekker who was proposed to start a restaurant/Food Design studio called Proef (which means both "taste" and "test" in Dutch) in Rotterdam. Within a year this meeting caused these two people to start working together. The collaboration was the opening of the Second Proef in Amsterdam for experimental dinner concepts.

In 2008, Vogelzang published her first book called Eat Love: Food Concepts by Eating-Designer Marije Vogelzang. The same year, she had her first solo exhibition at Axis Gallery in Tokyo.

In 2011, instead of focusing on her restaurants, she started to spend more time developing her design practice. This was when she created projects such as Eat Love Budapest which was in the form of installation/performance and is among her most significant works. This year was when Studio Marije Vogelzang was born.

In 2014, She became the head of the "New Food Non Food" department at Design Academy Eindhoven.

In 2015, she founded the Dutch Institute of Food and Design as a global platform for designers working with food.

In 2019, Vogelzang created "Food and Design Dive", a live online course. Her other courses include "Creative Strategies for Sensitive Pirates", "Advanced Dive", and "Summer School".

In 2025, she established "Food Design Playground", the first initiative of its kind. The place aims to give people the opportunity to taste, think, create, and learn to look at food differently.

== Bibliography ==
In 2009, Marije published her first book Eat Love: Food Concepts by Eating-Designer Marije Vogelzang This book, which is among the first books written in the field of food design, includes eight different chapters: Psychology, Culture, Senses, Nature, Action, Science, Technique, and Society.

In 2022, she published another book Lick It: Challenge the Way You Experience Food, describing her experience in the field of food design theory and practice.

== Significant Projects ==
Eat Love Budapest. A 4-day performance where Roma Women have fed over 400 visitors while telling their life stories. During this performance held in a white space, 10 separate spaces is created. Each of the spaces is divided into two parts by a white textile: one part is a strange room where a Hungarian participant sits while cannot look outside through the textile.

In this project Vogelzang considers "feeding" as a universal language and explores the relationship between people and food.

Volumes. This project focused on the design of eating devices which help eaters think their plates are fuller than they are to reduce overeating.
