= Clément Bénech =

French journalist and novelist

Clément Bénech (born 28 April 1991) is a French novelist. He wrote his first novel, L'été slovène (transl. The Slovenian Summer) in 2013, published through Groupe Flammarion. He published his second novel, Lève-toi et charme (transl. The Slovenian Summer) in 2015. He is from Paris and has studied journalism at the Sorbonne University.

His first readings were Éric Chevillard and Patrick Modiano.

== Awards and honors ==
- 2013: nominated for the Prix Orange du livre

== Bibliography ==
- L'été slovène, Flammarion, 2013
- Lève-toi et charme, Flammarion, 2015
