= Marianna Simnett =

British multi-disciplinary artist

Marianna Simnett (born 1986) is a Berlin-based multi-disciplinary artist who works with film, installation, drawing, and sculpture. She is best known for her large-scale video installations.

== Early life and education ==
Simnett studied at a musical theatre school as a teenager. She received a BA from Nottingham Trent University in 2007 and an MA from the Slade School of Art in 2013.

== Themes ==
Simnett's work examines the perception and imagination of the (human) body. Throughout her body of work, and within individual works, there is a nonlinear narrative of "bodily dread" relating to issues of vulnerability, autonomy, and control. Frequent themes include sickness and the intervention of medicine, violation, sexuality, identity, and metamorphosis. Simnett intends the discomfort and pain depicted on the screen to illustrate "the impossible gulf between my pain and someone else's pain" and embody the themes of empathy, trauma and catharsis.

=== Recurring motifs ===
Botox figured in Blood In My Milk, The Needle and the Larynx, and Worst Gift. A recurring character Isabel, played by Isabel Maclaren, appears in The Udder and Blood. Syncope, or fainting, features prominently in Simnett's work, being central in Faint and Faint With Light.

== Practice ==
Simnett works with people who have not trained as actors, such as children, farmers, doctors and scientists. She makes extensive use of abrupt transitions from one sequence to another and offers a fragmented representation of multi-faceted reality. She often re-uses footage from early works: Blood In My Milk merges newly edited footage from her trilogy (The Udder, Blue Roses and Blood) with Worst Gift, a reprise of The Needle and The Larynx.

== Influences ==
Her practice has been influenced by Jenny Holzer, Barbara Kruger and Cindy Sherman. Simnett credits Bruce Nauman with getting her into moving-image work, and cites Derek Jarman as a "huge influence". Simnett has affinity to Mika Rottenberg.

== Collaborations ==
In March 2020 Simnett founded the digital art space Home Cooking alongside Asad Raza.

== Works ==
- Faint (2012), recalls the story of Simnett's grandfather, who escaped death by firing squad by fainting.
- Dog (2013)
- The Udder (2014), shot on a small, rural, robotic dairy farm, is a clinical account of bovine mastitis. It is described as a coming-of-age story and a cautionary tale about female chastity. It in the first in a trilogy, along with Blue Roses and Blood. It is a single channel HD video, 15 minutes and 30 seconds long.
- Blue Roses (2015) goes back and forth between a varicose vein operation and the creation of a cyborg cockroach It premiered in summer 2015 at Mull Little Theatre.
- Blood (2015) recalls the history of Emma Eckstein and her treatment by Wilhelm Fliess. It features Lali, an Albanian sworn virgin and references a Freudian case study and the Code of Lekë Dukagjini.
- The Needle and The Larynx (2016) shows the artist receiving a botulinum toxin injection in her larynx to lower her voice.
- Faint with Light (2016) is room-size installation that consists of a 12 metre wall of bright LEDs synchronized to a soundtrack of the artists hyperventilating until she faints.
- Worst Gift (2017) depicts a group of thuggish adolescent boys trapped in a dirty hospital, subjected to endless injections to their vocal chords.
- Blood In My Milk (2018) is an immersive 73-minute, five-channel video installation, made between 2014 and 2017 Its characters are surgeons, scientists, children and insects. It examines fears and blood-injection-injury type phobia.
- The Bird Game (2019) is a wicked fairy tale in which a loquacious and bloodthirsty crow, voiced by Joanne Whalley, lures six children to a secluded mansion and snares them in a sequence of deranged games. Scored by Oliver Coates, shot on 16 mm film by Robbie Ryan, co-written by Marianna Simnett and Charlie Fox.
- Dance, Stanley, Dance (2020) is a digitally animated watercolour inspired by found roadkill. The soundtrack was composed by Daniel Blumberg.
- Tito's Dog (2020) was created during the 2020 COVID-19 lockdowns, and confronts the artist's own identity whilst also continuing her investigation into interspecies relationships.
- Pillow (2020) is a music video for Daniel Blumberg romance shot during lockdown on 16 mm, starring found roadkill in Malvern, UK. On a dark country road, a cast of squirrels and birds are struck down one by one by a passing car. Waking from the dead, their broken corpses gather in an erotic congregation beneath the earth.

== Exhibitions ==
Simnett has had solo exhibitions at galleries including Institute of Modern Art, Brisbane, Frans Hals Museum, Haarlem, Kunsthalle Zürich, Museum für Moderne Kunst, and New Museum, New York. She has had group exhibitions at the Ming Contemporary Art Museum, Shanghai, and Serpentine Gallery in London.

== Awards ==
In 2014 she won the Jerwood Foundation's Jerwood/FVU Awards. Jerwood commissioned The Udder (2014) and Blood (2015).
