= Cubitts =

Eyeglass manufacturer based in Kings Cross, London

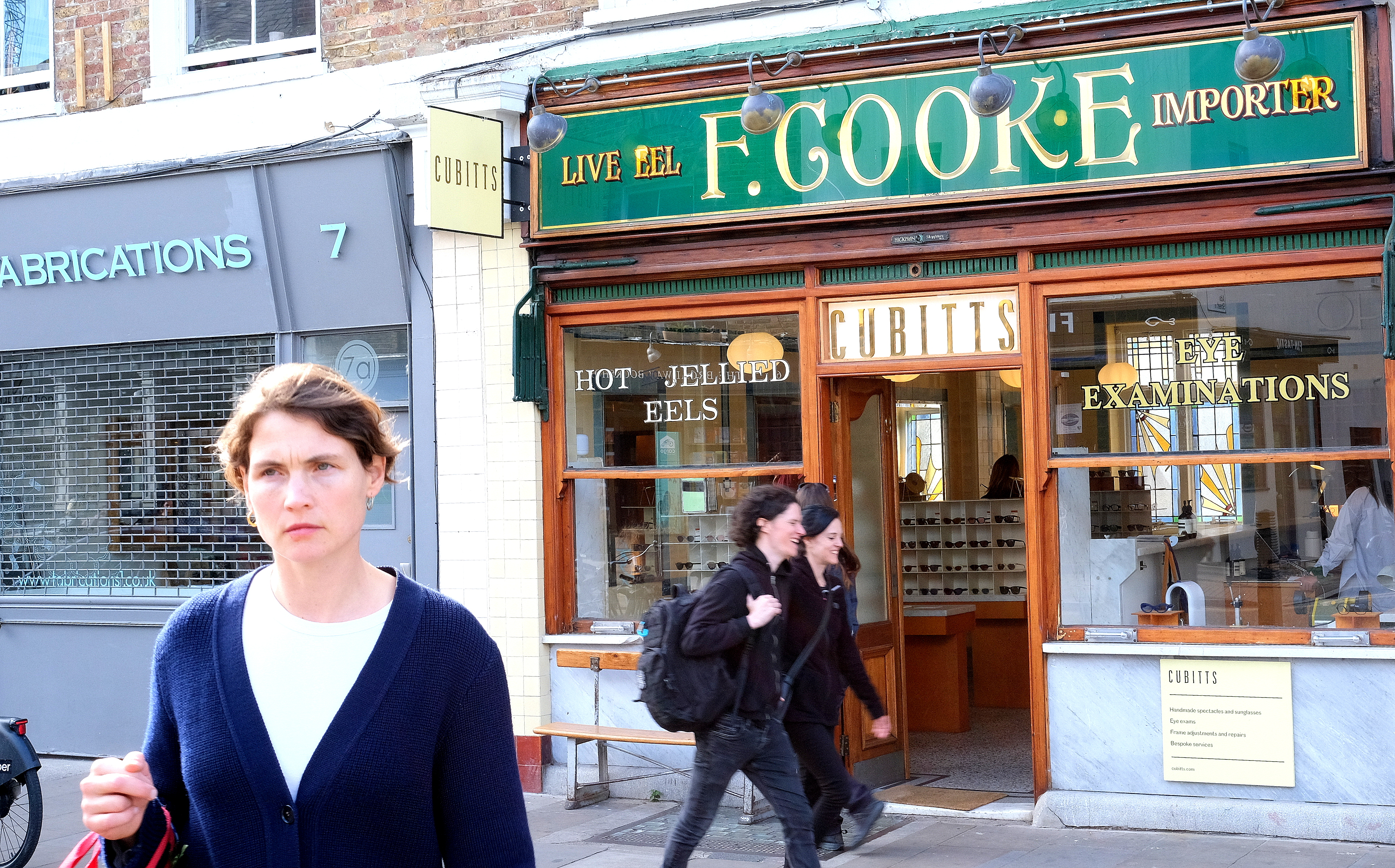
Cubitts branch in London based in a former pie and mash shop.

Cubitts, established in 2012, is an eyeglass manufacturer based in Kings Cross, London, England. The company creates handcrafted frames, and sunglasses, constructed with custom pins that secure the acetate based on a rivet designed by Lewis Cubitt, one of the three Cubitt brothers who inspired the brand name. The pin drilling process is done by hand, and takes time to perfect. It allows hinges to be easily maintained.

The brand has twenty stores, eighteen of which are in the UK and two of which are in New York. All of the stores offer bespoke and made-to-measure services. Cubitts also run spectacle making classes at their King's Cross workshop.

In 2017, Cubitts collaborated with the Hands of X project, which explored ideas of fashion and ownership with prosthetic hands. A mock up shop was set up in Cubitts' Charing Cross store, in which users of prosthetics were able to craft a bespoke hand for themselves.

In July 2018, Cubitts launched a charity cleaning cloth designed by English artist Tracey Emin in aid of Terrence Higgins Trust. In June 2019, Cubitts released a spectacle cleaning cloth with graphic artist Camille Walala in aid of End Youth Homelessness.

The brand has collaborated with British heritage brand Sunspel on a capsule collection of sunglasses, and with fashion designer Phoebe English on two pairs of custom sustainable sunglasses, made from their workshop's waste. Most recently, the brand has collaborated with iconic menswear brand, YMC to create a collection of sunglasses

In November 2018, Cubitts launched an exhibition charting London's six hundred-year history of spectacles at the St James's Market Pavilion. It included a frame made from items 'mudlarked' from the River Thames.

== See also ==
- William Cubitt
- Lewis Cubitt
- Thomas Cubitt
