= Camille Walala =

French multidisciplinary artist

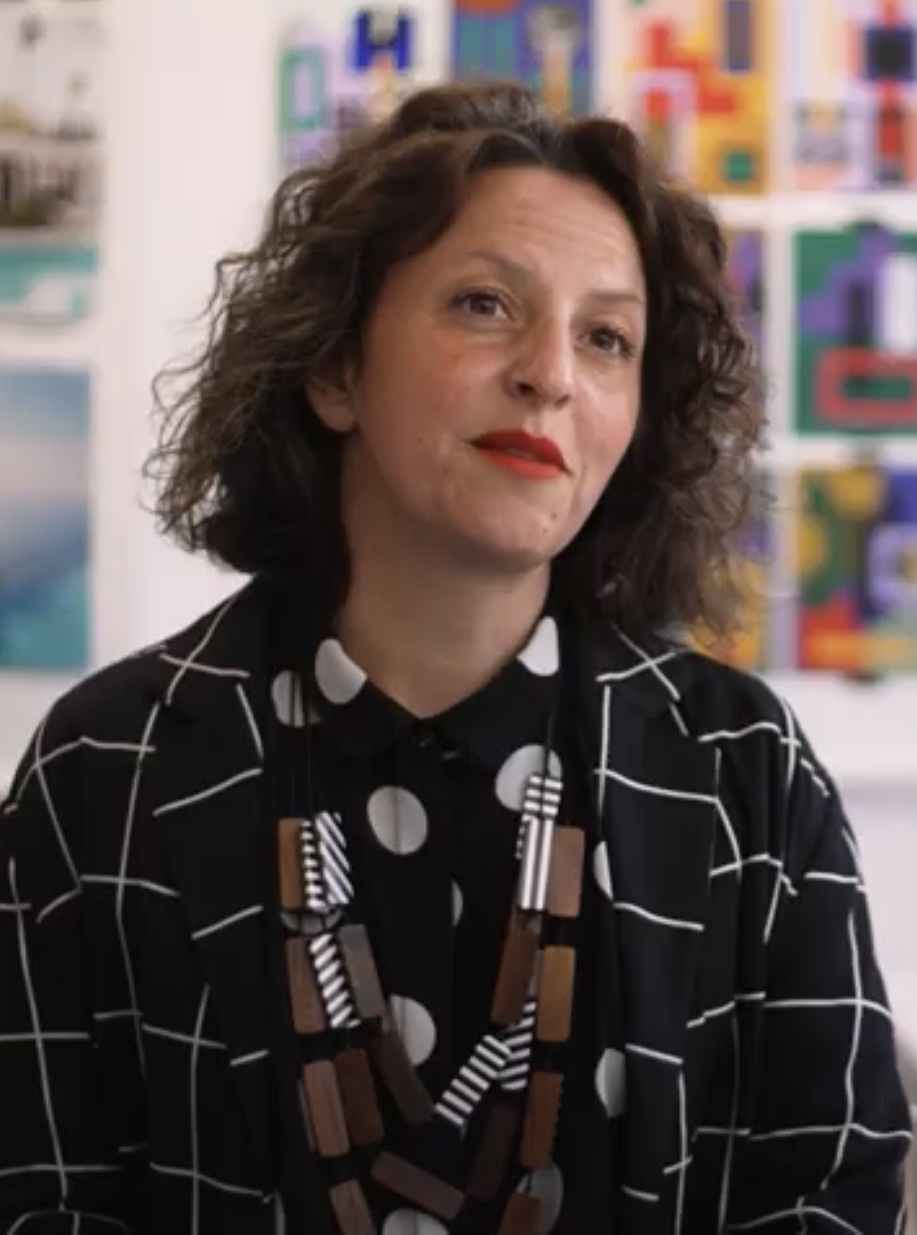
- Walala in 2021
- Born: Camille Vic-Dupont; August 1975 (age 50–51); Piégon, France
- Education: University of Brighton
- Years active: 2009–present
- Partner: Julia Jomaa

Camille Vic-Dupont (born August 1975), known professionally as Camille Walala, is a French multi-disciplinary designer based in East London. She is known for her life-size murals and installations and her Memphis Group-inspired patterns.

== Early life and education ==
Walala grew up in Piégon, a small village in the South of France, where her mother ran a B&B. Her father, an architect, moved to Paris after they divorced. Walala struggled at school due to her dyslexia and felt her eccentric style was judged.

In 1997, her father encouraged her to spend the summer in London to improve her English skills. Although initially reluctant, Walala loved it and returned to London in 1999 after completing her French Literature degree. During her 20s, she worked in hospitality while experimenting with potential career paths. She started taking drawing and pottery classes. As suggested by a teacher, Walala studied Textile Design at the University of Brighton, graduating in 2009.

== Career ==
After graduating from university in 2009, Walala established her brand Studio Walala in Hackney, East London.

In 2017, Walala was invited by NOW Gallery in South London to create an interactive, life size installation, for which the studio created an immersive so-called "temple of wonder". Also in 2017, she designed a "a gigantic, vibrantly patterned bouncy castle", a "Landmark Project" for the London Design Festival.

In 2020, as one of the highlights of the inaugural London Mural Festival, Walala transformed Adams Plaza Bridge at Canary Wharf Crossrail station, London, into a piece of creative art. The bridge is decorated with colourful geometric shapes and patterns, and plays with the long perspective of the tunnel. The bridge is now a permanent part of award-winning public art collection at Canary Wharf Art Trail, and visitors can enjoy its beauty all year round.

In 2021, during a period of lockdown due to the COVID-19 pandemic, Walala reimagined the Design Museum shop as a grocery store, selling essential products re-designed by emerging artists such as Kentaro Okawara, Joey Yu, Isadora Lima and Michaela Yearwood-Dan.

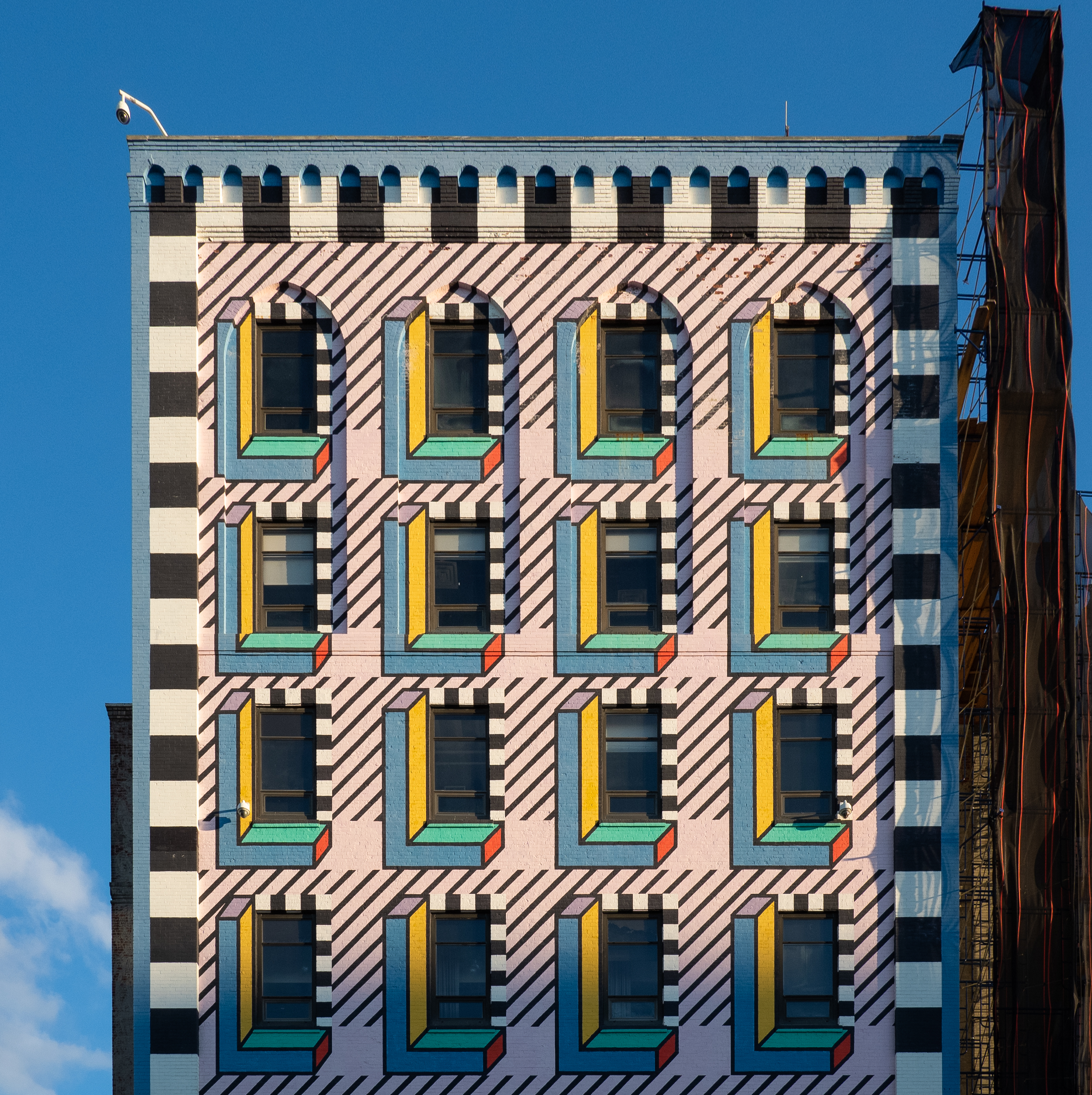
Industry City mural

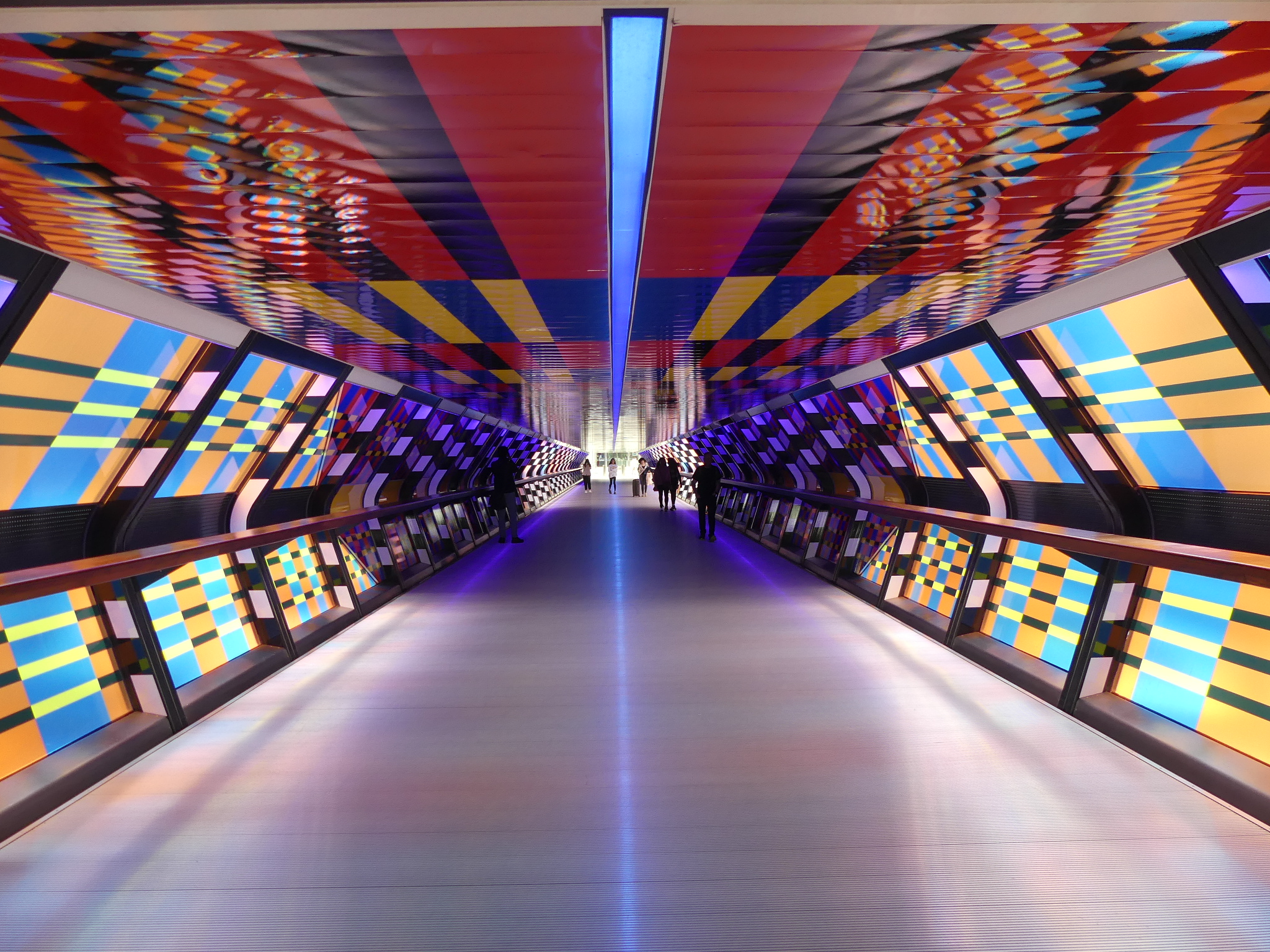
Captivated By Colour (2020), Adams Plaza Bridge at Canary Wharf Crossrail station, London

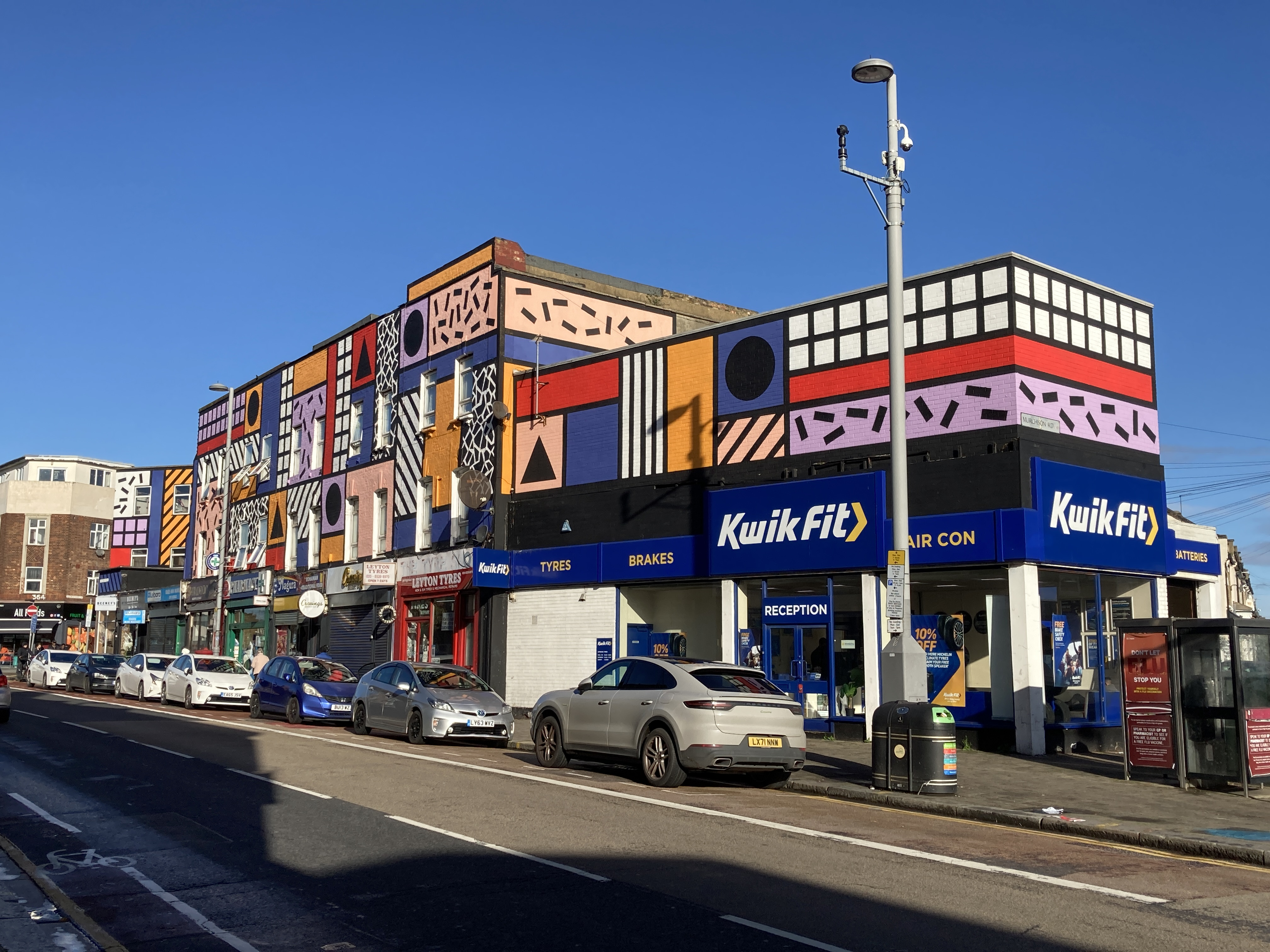
Leyton High Road mural

== Selected work ==
- WALALA X PLAY, NOW Gallery, London, United Kingdom, 2017
- Walala Lounge, London Design Festival, 2019
- Captivated By Colour , for the first London Mural Festival, London, United Kingdom, 2020
- House of Dots, for Lego, Coal Drops Yard, London, United Kingdom, 2020
- Supermarket, Design Museum, London, United Kingdom, 2021
- Official poster design for Montreux Jazz Festival 2022
