= Simone Brewster =

British artist and designer

- Brewster at the Design Museum's PLATFORM 2 exhibition (2026)
- Born: c. 1983; London, UK
- Education: Bartlett School of Architecture; University College London; Royal College of Art
- Occupations: Artist; designer
- Children: 1
- Website: simonebrewster.co.uk

A ring by Brewster and a mahogany bust purchased at Shepherd's Bush Market by the artist's parents in the 1960s, Design Museum, London (2026)

Simone Brewster (born c. 1983) is a British artist whose work spans sculpture, furniture, jewellery, painting and public architecture. Her practice explores identity, memory and cultural inheritance through what she describes as "intimate architectures".

Brewster's work is held in collections including the UK's Victoria and Albert Museum, London Museum, and Design Museum, as well as the National Museum of African American History and Culture in Washington, D.C. In 2026 she was the subject of the Design Museum's PLATFORM programme, a yearlong exhibition dedicated to contemporary design practice.

== Life and career ==
Born and raised in London, the daughter of a Jamaican mother and Trinidadian father, she has spoken of how a childhood visit to Trinidad had an important influence on her creative development, describing it as an early introduction to the ways design and material culture shape everyday life.

Brewster initially studied at UCL's Bartlett School of Architecture. After completing the first part of an architecture degree, she continued her studies at the Royal College of Art (RCA) in the Design Products Master of Arts programme, graduating in 2007. During her time at the RCA, her coursework spanned various media and materials including metalworking and ceramics, and she was tutored by designers such as Hannes Koch of the art collective Random International, and self-taught British polymath Tom Dixon.

She held her first solo gallery show in the summer of 2023 at NOW Gallery in South London. The exhibition, titled The Shape of Things, "purposefully blurred the boundaries between mediums, subject matter, geography, gender, art, craft" so that they "need not be labelled 'craft' or 'art', 'high' or 'low'".The exhibition explored her concept of "intimate architectures", a phrase that describes the relationship that texture and three-dimensional form have on memory and emotion.

In 2026, she was the focus of the second edition of the Design Museum's PLATFORM programme, "an annual display dedicated to showcasing contemporary design practice" (the inaugural edition of which was devoted to fellow British designer Bethan Laura Wood). It is a yearlong exhibition that runs through January 2027 and spans "the range of [Brewster's] design practice, from jewellery, furniture, sculpted forms to public architecture." Reviewing the exhibition, journalist Simon Cartwright noted how her work maintains "a distinctive architectural and sculptural logic, translating historical reference, diasporic memory and intimate emotion into objects, jewellery, furniture and spatial interventions."

Brewster's work is in both private and public collections such as the Design Museum, Victoria and Albert Museum, Walker Art Gallery, and London Museum in the UK, and the National Museum of African American History and Culture (NMAAHC) in Washington, D.C.

== Selected works ==
Brewster's work explores identity, race, gender, cultural inheritance and the relationship between bodies, objects and space. Her practice moves between art, design and architecture, often drawing upon African and Caribbean histories, vernacular traditions and architectural forms. A recurring concept within her work is that of "intimate architectures", a term she uses to describe objects and environments that shape personal and collective experience.

In 2010 Brewster created The Mammy and The Negress, a pair of sculptural furniture works addressing historical representations of Black women. Conceived and exhibited together, the works were later acquired separately by the London Museum and the National Museum of African American History and Culture respectively. Brewster has described the works as foundational to her practice. Curator Danielle Thom observed that "the entire piece functions as a metaphor for Black female labour, the eponymous 'Mammy' stereotype on which so much white exploitation has rested."

Negrita bench in the Design Museum, London, 2026 (Negress chaise longue from National Museum of African American History and Culture collection pictured in photograph displayed behind the piece)

Her Tropical Noire series, first developed in 2014, is a collection of vessels in tulipwood and maple that combine architectural references with shapes "inspired by African water vessels, ceremonial forms, and totemic sculptures".

Tropical Noir (c. 2015), Platform exhibition, Design Museum, London, 2026

Tropical Noir development drawings in a Design Museum display case, London, 2026

Brewster was commissioned by the Mayor of London and London Design Festival to create an outdoor installation for the 2023 festival. The resulting piece, situated on the Strand and titled Spirit of Place, included five colourful totemic cork sculptures, was intended to evoke the Herdade de Rio Frio cork forest in Portugal. It was the culmination of a year-long collaborative process with the Portuguese cork producer Corticeira Amorim that was as part of Sadiq Khan's "Creative Economy Growth Programme".

The Crown Combs series of sculptural combs, first exhibited in 2023, draws upon historic African hairstyles and traditions. Following their inclusion in the Walker Art Gallery exhibition Conversations, examples from the series were acquired for the museum's permanent collection.

In 2024 she designed a series of pieces for the British homewares retailer Habitat's 60th anniversary collection.

Her Temple of Relics pavilion, an outdoor seating and events venue for the 2025 London Festival of Architecture, was described as an "inner-city sanctuary" of "arches and obelisks".

Ring by Brewster, Design Museum, 2026

Bracelets by Brewster in the Design Museum, London, 2026

Necklace in the Design Museum, 2026

== Personal life ==
Brewster has a son who was born in 2022.

== Exhibitions ==
=== Solo exhibitions ===
- 2026–2027 PLATFORM 2: Simone Brewster, Design Museum, London
- 2024 Changing Tides, J/M Gallery, London
- 2023 The Shape of Things, NOW Gallery, London
- 2023 Spirit of Place, London Design Festival, Strand Aldwych, London

=== Group exhibitions ===
- 2024 CONVERSATIONS, Walker Art Gallery, Liverpool, UK
- 2024 Design Dialogues, Design Burger, London, UK
- 2021 London Making Now, Museum of London, UK
- 2013 Subversive Design, Brighton Museum and Art Gallery, UK
- 2013 The Perfect Place To Grow: Celebrating 175 Years Of The Royal College of Art, Royal College of Art, London
- 2011 RCA Black, Royal College Of Art, Henry Moore Galleries. London

== Publications ==
- Thom, Danielle (2026). Platform 2: Simone Brewster. London: Design Museum. ISBN 978-1-872005-88-1.
- Philpott, Alex; Pardo, Benjamin; Didero, Maria Cristina; Teague, Norman (2026). Philpott, Alex; Pearce, Oscar; Page, Kester; Slatter, Joe (eds.). The Product Design 100. London: Design Burger. pp. 210–211. ISBN 978-1-0369-5572-4.
