= Hattie Stewart =

British illustrator

- Born: Colchester, Essex, United Kingdom
- Education: Kingston University
- Occupations: Illustrator and artist
- Awards: ADC Young Guns 15
- Website: www.hattiestewart.com

Hattie Stewart and Lotte Department Store Collaboration

Hattie Stewart is an illustrator and artist. She is best known for a technique called 'doodle-bombs', where she illustrates over magazine covers, newspapers and photos.

== Life and career ==
A native of Colchester, Stewart studied illustration at Kingston University, from which she graduated in 2010, and is now based in London, United Kingdom with her studio in East London.

She is best known for her so-called 'Doodle-Bombs' where she illustrates over magazine covers, as well as her playful and brightly coloured iconography. Stewart's art has been featured in numerous advertising campaigns, painted as large-scale murals and used as print designs on clothing and footwear. In 2021, she was commissioned to create the design for a basketball court in Portsmouth. Her commission was financed by a crowdfunding campaign. In 2023, the video game Fall Guys did a collaboration with her.

Her work is often created with acrylic pens from the brand POSCA.

== Selected solo exhibitions ==
- I Forgot What I Was Doing, 2023, at E03 Gallery, Beijing, China.
- Lazy Days, 2021, at Hen's Teeth in Dublin, Ireland.
- I Draw, 2019, at Daelim Museum, Seoul, Korea.
- I Don't Have Time for This, 2018, at NOW Gallery in London, United Kingdom.
- Adversary, 2015, at House of Illustration, London, United Kingdom.
- Dollhouse, 2015, at KK Outlet, London, United Kingdom

== Published works ==
- Living With: Hattie Stewart. Roads Publishing, 2016
- Hattie Stewart's Doodlebomb Sticker Book. Laurence King Publishing, 2017
- Hello Cheeky: 50 Postcards with Stickers. Clarkson Potter Publishers, 2020
- From One Universe to Another. Colour Code Printing, 2021
- From One Universe to Another 2. Colour Code Printing, 2023
- Archive No.1: A Small Collection Of Drawings. Self-published, 2024

== Selected awards ==
- ADC Young Guns 15, 2017
