= Barber Osgerby =

British industrial design company

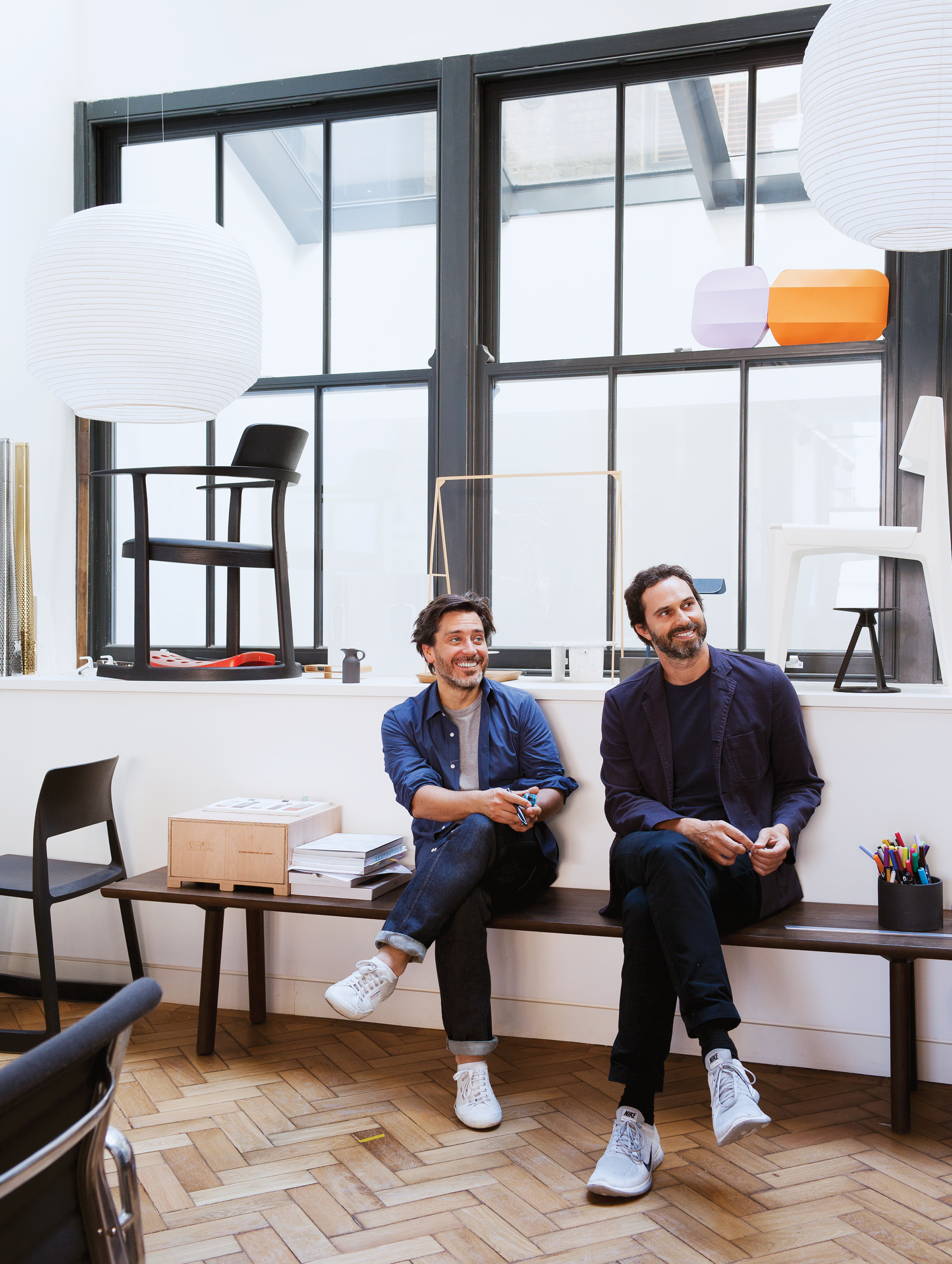

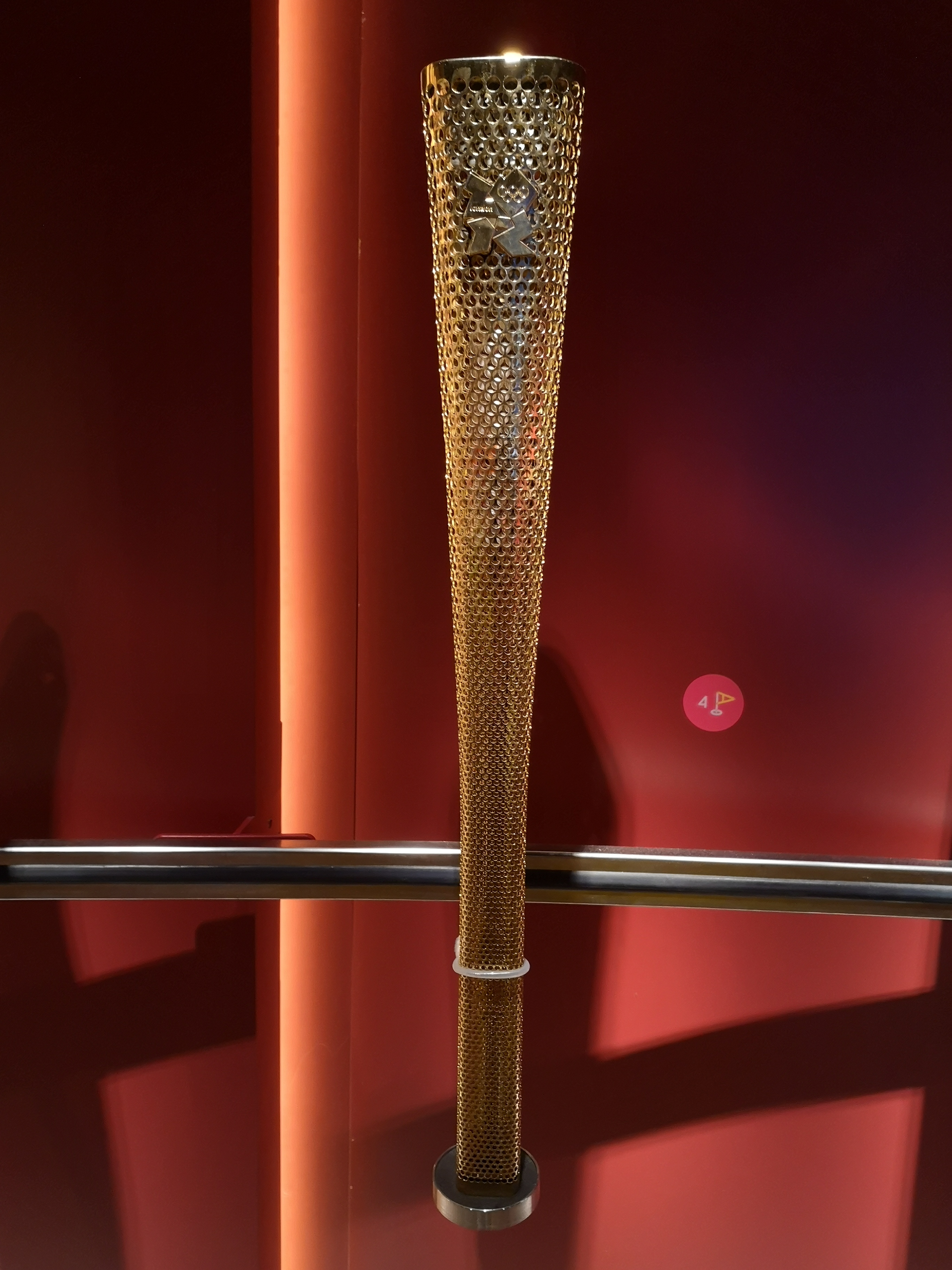
London 2012 Olympic Torch

Barber Osgerby is a London-based industrial design studio founded in 1996 by British designers Edward Barber and Jay Osgerby. Historically named variously Barber Osgerby Associates, BOA, Barber & Osgerby and BarberOsgerby, the practice has been called Barber Osgerby since 2008. Barber and Osgerby's work encompasses interiors, furniture, lighting and product design as well as art and architectural-scale projects.

They are both Royal Designers for Industry (RDI) and are past recipients of the Jerwood Applied Arts prize. Both are Honorary Doctors of Arts, and Osgerby is an Honorary Fellow of Ravensbourne. The pair have lectured internationally and their work is held in permanent collections around the world including the Victoria & Albert Museum, London; the Metropolitan Museum of Art, New York; London's Design Museum; and the Art Institute of Chicago; the Olympic Museum in Switzerland; the Vitra Design Museum in Germany; the Art Institute of Chicago; and the Indianapolis Museum of Art.

Barber and Osgerby have developed collections for B&B Italia, Flos, Vitra, Magis, Cappellini, Swarovski, Venini and Established & Sons, and Knoll among others. They have also designed works for private commissions, and for public spaces such as the De La Warr Pavilion, The Royal Institute of British Architects (RIBA), and the Portsmouth Cathedral. Significant projects include the Tip Ton chair for Vitra in 2011, the London 2012 Olympic and Paralympic torch and a £2 coin commemorating the 150th anniversary of the London Underground in 2013.

Barber and Osgerby are also founders of Universal Design Studio, a London-based architecture and interior design studio, and Map Project Office, a London-based industrial design consultancy focused on design strategy.

== Background ==
Edward Barber, born in Shrewsbury in 1969, studied interior design at Leeds Polytechnic. Jay Osgerby, born in Oxford in 1969, completed a foundation art program at Oxford Brookes University and studied product design at Ravensbourne College in London. The two met while studying for their Master's degrees in Architecture at London's Royal College of Art. After graduating, in 1996 they set up their studio Barber Osgerby Associates.

== Early architecture and furniture ==
Barber Osgerby Associates was originally based out of Barber and Osgerby's flat in Trellick Tower. The studio moved to the Isokon workshops in Turnham Green, Chiswick and worked on variety of hospitality, residential and office architectural projects, their architectural work supporting their furniture design during this period.

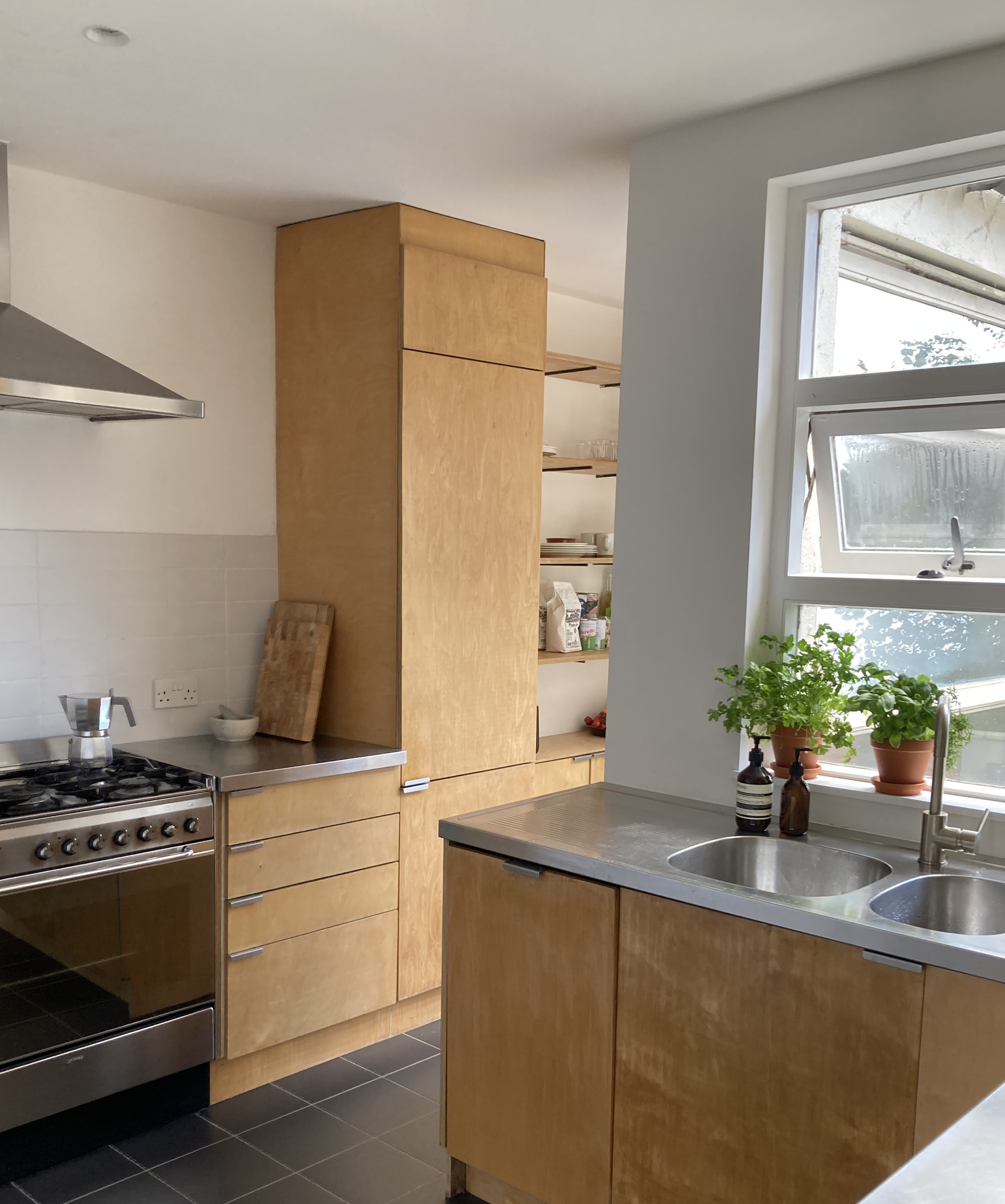
Birch-plywood kitchen by Barber Osgerby Associates, London 1999

Close to wood workshops, Barber & Osgerby learned a lot about furniture making and particularly about plywood. This informed both the small architectural projects they focused on at the time and their first furniture piece, the Loop Table, originally designed for the lobby of a restaurant but subsequently manufactured by Isokon. The Loop Table was shown at the London Design Fair in 1997, spotted by Giulio Cappellini and introduced into the Cappellini catalogue in 1997.

Much of Barber and Osgerby's early work involved the shaping of sheet material such as perspex and plywood, influenced by the white card that they had used frequently in architectural model making. The Loop table evolved into a series of products that shared the same plywood loop construction while the Flight Stool in 1998, the Pilot Table in 1999 and Stencil Screen in 2000 employed the similar materials and processes. The Shell Table in 2000, which was nominated for the Compasso d'Oro, and the Shell Chair in 2001 were further structural studies in moulded birch plywood.

By 2001, Barber Osgerby Associates were "turning away work" and split the practice with the architecture and interior design studio renamed Universal and the furniture and industrial design studio renamed Barber Osgerby.

== Barber Osgerby ==
Barber & Osgerby's first furniture to use solid wood was the oak Home Table in 2000, initially conceived for their own homes. In 2002 the pair were asked to design new furniture for the 13th century St. Thomas’ Portsmouth Cathedral, as part of an ongoing programme of renovation. The only definitive criterion for the pieces was that they be made of oak. Solid oak is heavy and a key requirement for furniture was that it was light and easily manoeuvrable. This was resolved by the engineering of the design, resulting in the slender form of the bench.

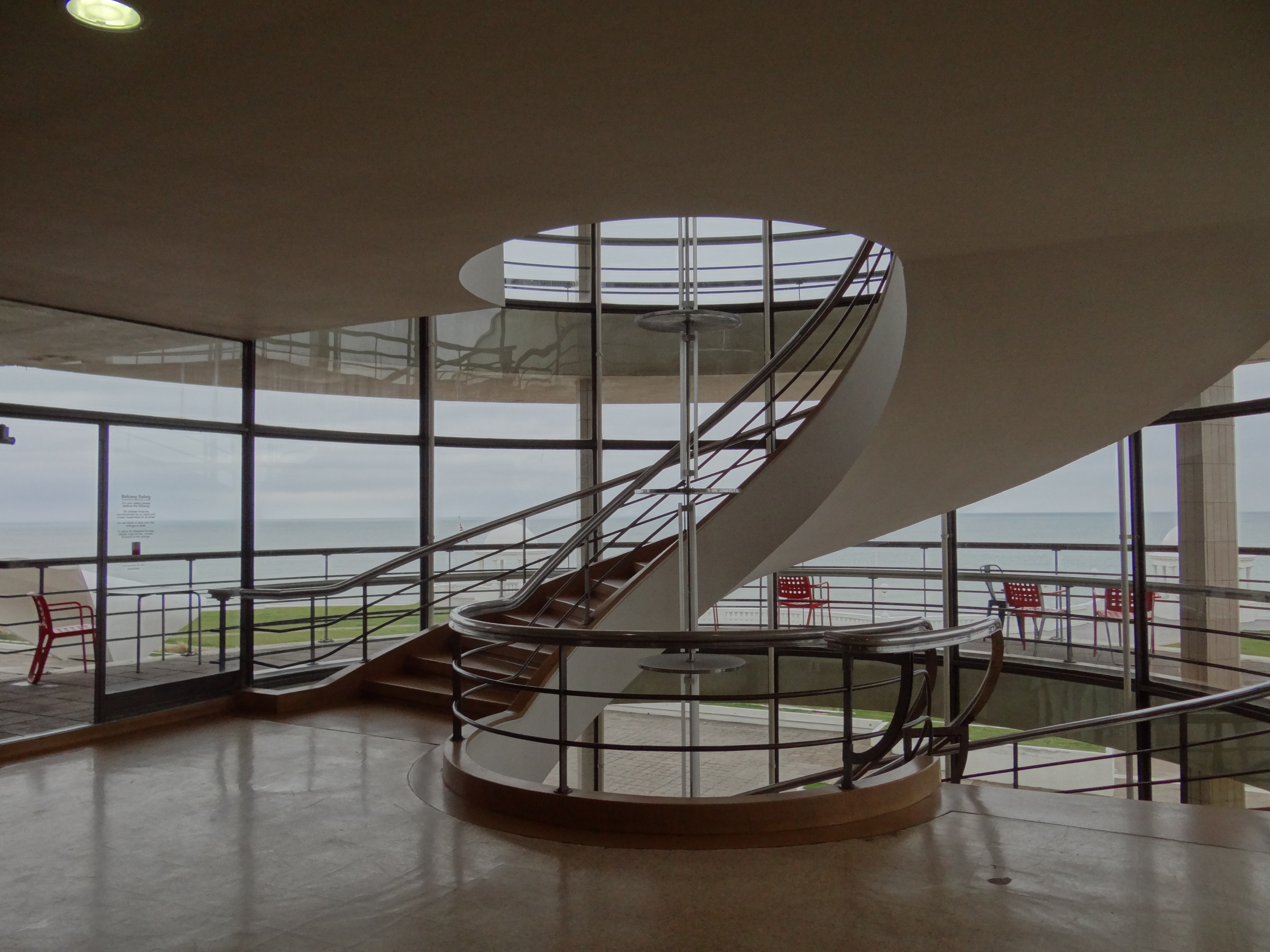
De La Warr Pavilion and terrace with De La Warr Chairs

In 2005 Barber and Osgerby moved on from wood, fulfilling a commission to design a new chair for the newly restored modernist De La Warr Pavilion in Bexhill-on-Sea. The resulting aluminium armchairs were in two versions, the restaurant version was upholstered while the external version featured a powder-coated finish and perforated seat and back, capable of enduring the coastal exposure to on the pavilion's outdoor terraces. The De La Warr Chair was subsequently put into production by Established & Sons who also produced Barber Osgerby's aluminium Zero-In table as part of their launch collection in 2005. That table's construction employed automotive industry welding and polishing techniques never before applied to furniture manufacturing. These techniques were employed again in 2007 when Barber Osgerby were commissioned to design the entrance foyer desk for the Royal Institute of British Architects (RIBA) in Portland Place, London resulting in a contemporary reception desk wrapped in a skin of hand-beaten stainless steel, mirror-polished to reflect its surroundings. Similarly, though now employing aerospace engineering techniques, Barber Osgerby's Iris tables for Established & Sons in 2008 were milled in sections from solid aluminum, anodized and joined with hidden bolts and tightened using magnets.

Barber & Osgerby's first lamp, the Tab lamp for Flos was launched in 2007, it seemingly marked a return to the folded form but had evolved from a series of ideas for lights conceived in the early 2000s and from 2007 Barber & Osgerby embraced a broadening range of products, projects and techniques.

In 2009, Barber and Osgerby launched their first major commission for Murano glassmakers Venini: Lantern Marine, a limited edition collection of large vases composed of coloured interlocking components. In 2010 they created an experimental installation for Sony at the Salone Internazionale del Mobile in Milan exploring how electronics could be better integrated within contemporary home interiors through a series of conceptual objects that employed Sony's new sound technologies. Another investigation, this time into school furniture and how movement in a chair can aid concentration, resulted in the forward-tilting Tip Ton chair launched with Vitra in 2011 and relaunched from recycled plastic as the Tip Ton RE in 2020.

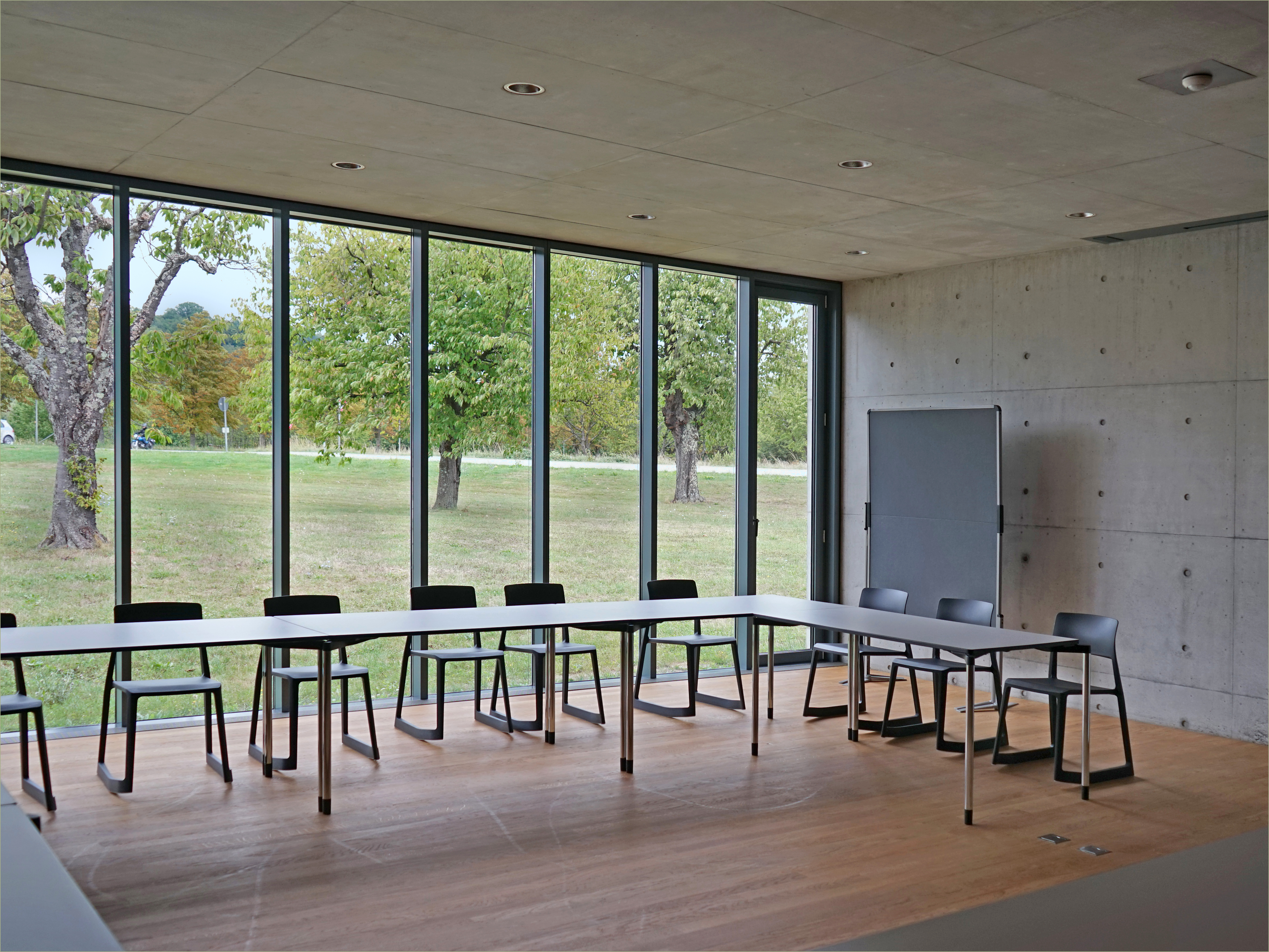
Tip Ton Chairs in the Vitra Conference Pavilion by Tadao Ando

In 2011, Barber and Osgerby won the London Organising Committee of the Olympic and Paralympic Games (LOCOG) competition to design the London 2012 Olympic Torch. The Torch was named the Design Museum's 2012 Design of the Year.

Works in marble followed in 2012 including the pair's first design for B&B Italia, the sculptural cantilevered Tobi Ishi table, and the Western Façade bench, commissioned to commemorate ten years of the London Design Festival and exhibited during the festival in the Victoria & Albert Museum's John Madejski Garden. The following year saw Barber Osgerby's design of a £2 coin for The Royal Mint, commemorating 150 years of the London Underground, depicting the familiar image of a Tube train emerging from a tunnel, the outer ring of the coin being used graphically to suggest the tunnel walls. A further commission for the London Design Festival followed in 2014, Barber Osgerby designed the installation 'Double Space' at the V&A Museum in London.

Barber & Osgerby's range of work expanded further to encompass an ongoing collaboration on porcelain tile with Mutina started from 2013; the AXOR One shower control for Hansgrohe in 2015; the Pilot chair for Knoll in 2015; the Olio range of tableware from Royal Doulton that was introduced in 2015 and updated in 2021; the Pacific office chair for Vitra (which was chosen by Jony Ive for the Apple headquarters building), and the Tibbo family of outdoor furniture for Dedon both in 2016; the Bellhop series of lamps for Flos from 2017, including the Bellhop floor in 2021 and a limited edition with Supreme in 2020; and the On & On family of recyclable stacking chairs for Emeco in 2019.

== Awards and honours ==
Barber and Osgerby have received numerous awards including the ICFF Editors Award for Best New Designer in 1998, the Jerwood Prize for Applied Arts in 2004 for a body of work judged to ‘combine clarity, coherence and beauty’, "Designers of the Future" at Design Basel/Miami in 2006, the Design Week Awards: Best Furniture Designer in 2015, and 2022 The Design Guild Mark.

In 2007 they were awarded the status of Royal Designers for Industry and in 2013 Edward Barber and Jay Osgerby were both appointed Officer of the Order of the British Empire (OBE) in the Birthday Honours for services to the design industry.
