= Matty Bovan =

British fashion designer (born 1990)

- Born: 1990 (age 35–36); York, England
- Education: Central Saint Martins
- Label: Matty Bovan
- Awards: Winner, International Woolmark Prize (2021)
- Website: mattybovan.com

Matty Bovan (born 1990) is a British fashion designer. He founded his eponymous label in 2016 after graduating from Central Saint Martins, and has presented it at London Fashion Week while running the business from his home city of York, England. In 2021 he won both the International Woolmark Prize and its Karl Lagerfeld Award for Innovation. Working in hand-crafted knitwear made with local suppliers and deadstock fabrics, he has also created fashion installations for Somerset House, Yorkshire Sculpture Park, and NOW Gallery.

== Early life and education ==
Bovan was born in 1990 in York. His grandmother taught him to knit when he was eleven years old, and as a child he made dresses for dolls and spent time dyeing fabric and cutting up clothes with his mother. At sixteen he began a National Diploma in fashion at York College, and after a foundation course in Leeds he went to Central Saint Martins, where he completed a BA in Fashion Design with Knitwear and then an MA in the same subject, graduating in 2015. On the MA he was taught by Louise Wilson, who advised him to document how he dressed in photographs. His twelve-look graduate collection opened the MA show at London Fashion Week, and he received the L'Oréal Professionnel Creative Award, shared with Beth Postle. He was also one of three winners of that year's LVMH Graduate Prize, which took him to Louis Vuitton in Paris, where he worked as a junior designer under Nicolas Ghesquière. He left before the year was up, later saying the house "didn't really know where to put me".

== Career ==
=== Fashion East and first collections ===
After leaving Louis Vuitton, Bovan worked as an illustrator and makeup artist for Marc Jacobs and Miu Miu. In 2016 he launched his own label and was announced as the newest member of the London talent incubator Fashion East, showing his first collection with the group, for Spring/Summer 2017, that September. Stylist Katie Grand worked on his early shows, whose casts included models Charlotte Free, Grace Bol, and Edie Campbell.

In March 2017 Bovan designed a limited-edition collection for Barbie's 58th anniversary, including dolls dressed in pieces from his Spring/Summer 2017 collection, sold at the Fashion East store in Selfridges. After three seasons with Fashion East, he made his solo London Fashion Week debut in February 2018 with a show opened by Adwoa Aboah. His later shows received support from the British Fashion Council's NEWGEN bursary. For Spring/Summer 2019, presented in September 2018, milliner Stephen Jones made the hats and Coach collaborated on handbags. Also in September 2018, Bovan and the artists Rory Mullen and Adam Leach created Just/Unjust, an installation for the London Design Biennale at Somerset House inspired by a carved wooden chimneypiece at Burton Agnes Hall, an Elizabethan manor house near his home. In 2019 he undertook a research residency at the National Arts Education Archive.

=== Woolmark Prize ===
On June 10, 2021, Bovan was named winner of both the 2021 International Woolmark Prize and the Karl Lagerfeld Award for Innovation, the second designer after Edward Crutchley to take both awards at once. His entry, "Ode to the Sea", grew out of his Fall 2021 collection and was built around intarsia knits made with local suppliers in York and end-of-roll cloth from the Yorkshire mill AW Hainsworth, screen-printed with images from his own archive. The jury included Carine Roitfeld, Thom Browne, and Tim Blanks. Roitfeld said that Bovan reminded her "of a young Vivienne Westwood or a John Galliano and we desperately need that sort of designer in the fashion world of today". The two prizes carried awards of 200,000 and 100,000 Australian dollars respectively.

That October, Bovan created Boomerang, an installation in the Bothy Gallery at Yorkshire Sculpture Park in which visitors tried on his sculptural outfits and were photographed by an unseen photographer, a project about identity and the ownership of images online.

=== Dolce & Gabbana and Milan ===
In September 2022 Bovan was made a professor at Leeds Beckett University. That month he also presented his Spring 2023 collection at Milan Fashion Week, invited by Dolce & Gabbana after Stefano Gabbana began following him on Instagram. Shown in the city's Navigli district, the collection used corsetry and denim reissued from the Dolce & Gabbana archive, which Bovan hand-painted; the house also lent him seamstresses, production resources, and funding without involving itself in his process. Bovan called the method behind the collection "harnessed chaos". In The New York Times, Vanessa Friedman wrote that the majority of the collection had been "Made in York (England), exuding the fabled 'touch of the hand'".

=== Ribbons and later work ===
Bovan's first solo exhibition, Ribbons, opened at NOW Gallery in Greenwich, London, on November 30, 2022, as the gallery's 2022 Fashion Commission. The installation centered on a ceiling-height hand-knitted sweater that visitors could walk inside, with an experimental film about its making, a soundscape, and scents of geranium and lavender. A book of the same name followed in March 2023, published by IDEA Books in an edition of 100 copies with a foreword by the Vogue critic Sarah Mower.

In February 2023 Bovan presented his Fall/Winter 2023 collection at Upstairs at Langan's in Mayfair during London Fashion Week. For Spring 2024, that September, he staged the show in two parts: a private dinner catered by the East London restaurant Bistrotheque, and a runway presentation inside a glass structure that WWD compared to Alexander McQueen's Voss show; models in the cast included Ashley Graham and Winnie Harlow. His Fall/Winter 2024 collection appeared in February 2024 as Hello My Old Talismanic, a film shot at Burton Agnes Hall in which Bovan modeled the 26-look, largely tweed collection himself. In May 2024 he made an installation for a basement of the new Dover Street Market store in Paris. His Fall 2025 collection drew on the female protagonists of David Lynch's films and on Nolan Miller's costumes for the television series Dynasty; the lookbook featured his mother, Plum Bovan.

== Design approach ==
Bovan has kept his label in York rather than moving to London, saying the space and flexibility there make the work possible. His studio hand-dyes yarns in small batches, sends them out to knitters in the city, and hand-paints the returned panels; its knitting is done on domestic punchcard machines and by hand-crochet. He frequently builds collections from deadstock and end-of-roll fabrics. He has argued against mass production in fashion, saying that "craft is more important than ever". His references include science-fiction films such as Blade Runner, Mad Max, and Alien. Hannah Marriott of The Guardian has described his work as mixing "sci-fi dystopia with kitchen sink craft".

== Awards ==
In 2015 Bovan received the L'Oréal Professionnel Creative Award, shared with Beth Postle, and was one of three winners of that year's LVMH Graduate Prize. He was nominated for Emerging Designer Womenswear at the Fashion Awards in 2018 and again in 2019. In 2021 he won both the International Woolmark Prize and the Karl Lagerfeld Award for Innovation.
