= NOW Gallery =

Coordinates: 51.5003°N 0.0049°E

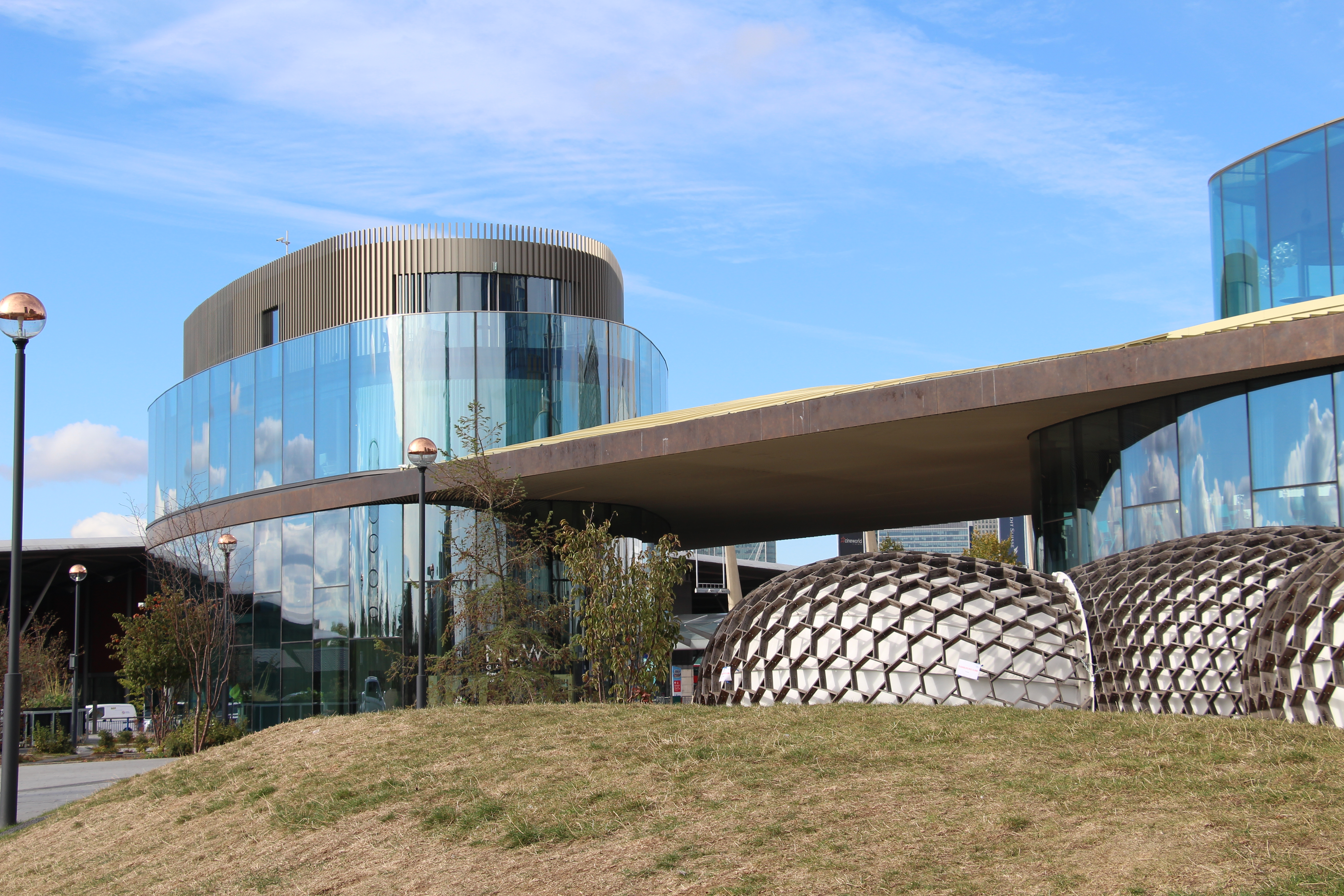
- Established: 2014
- Dissolved: 2025
- Location: Greenwich Peninsula
- Visitors: 20,000 (2017)
- Directors: Jemima Burrill; Kaia Charles
- Website: nowgallery.co.uk

NOW Gallery is a 130-square metre former public creative exhibition space located on the Greenwich Peninsula in South East London, England, founded in 2014. NOW Gallery closed in 2025; the future of the space is to be determined.

== History ==
Developed by Knight Dragon, the space is housed within the Greenwich Gateway Pavilions, a 7-metre-tall curved building designed by Marks Barfield architects as part of the area's urban regeneration project. NOW Gallery opened on 17 September 2014, with its programme entailing a "revolving door" of three-month commissions from both established and up-and-coming artists, designers and other creatives. NOW Gallery is run by a team consisting of founding curators Jemima Burrill and Kaia Charles.

As of 2017, NOW Gallery had an annual visitorship of 20 thousand.

Charles curates an annual Human Stories photography series. NOW Gallery hosted the 2020 Secret 7" exhibition, in which musicians submit songs while visual artists submit cover art for the songs. Secret 7" returned in 2024 to support the charity War Child.

In 2024, marking the 10-year anniversary of NOW Gallery, the gallery saw a rotation of five exhibitions.

At the end of August 2025, NOW Gallery officially closed after 11 years. The building was originally meant to be temporary, but Greenwich Council voted to make it permanent, with Knight Dragon's plans for it to be determined.

== Exhibitions ==
=== 2010s ===
Year	Title	Featuring	Ref.
2014–2015	Shade	Simon Heijdens	
2015	Aperture	Robert Orchardson	
2015	Emblema	Ricardo Cavolo	
2015	Floating / Falling / Drowning / Flying – An Introspective of Process	Phoebe English	
2015	Home Affairs	Creative director: Yinka Ilori	
2015	Straight Jacket Star Jumps	Alex Chinneck	
2016	Where Pioneers Live	MadeThought	
2016	In the Heart of a Whale	Margaux Carpentier	
2016	The People's Brick Company	Something & Son	
2016	Intimate Spaces	Various, including Cian Oba-Smith	
2016–2017	What I Like	Molly Goddard	
2017	The Iris	Rebecca Louise Law	
2017	The Island	Icinori	
2017	WALALA X PLAY	Camille Walala	
2017	Human Stories: The Body Issue	Various	
2017–2018	The Come Up	Charles Jeffrey	
2018	Harmonics in Space	Fred Butler	
2018	I Don't Have Time for This	Hattie Stewart	
2018	Indirect Sunlight	Laura Aldridge and James Rigler	
2018	Human Stories: Another England		
2018–2019	Rinse, Repeat	Richard Malone	
2019	The Mouse and his Child	Studio Morison	
2019	The Great Supper	Sara Shakeel	
2019	My Opera House	Kinska	
2019	Human Stories: Circa No Future	Nadia Huggins	
2019–2020	Silent Madness	Mowalola	

=== 2020s ===
Year	Title	Featuring	Ref.
2020	Slices of Time	Emmanuelle Moureaux	
2020	Secret 7"	Various	
2020–2021	Meanings and Attachments	Mah Rana	
2020–2021	Return to Slygo	Nicholas Daley	
2021	My Head is a Jungle	Manjit Thapp	
2021	Art Block	Collaboration with Design District	
2021–2022	Your Ship Has Landed	Lydia Chan	
2022	Feeling Good	Joy Yamusangie	
2022	Routine	Ben Cullen Williams and Gaika	
2022	Maiden Voyage	JeeYoung Lee	
2022	Human Stories: The Satirists	Various	
2022–2023	Ribbons	Matty Bovan	
2023	What You See Here / What You Hear Here	Darryl Daley	
2023	The Shape of Things	Simone Brewster	
2023	The Great Supper	Sara Shakeel	
2023	Human Stories: A Young South Africa	Various	
2023–2024	Greetings from Ireland	Robyn Lynch	
2024	Secret 7" with War Child	Various	
2024	Like a Melody: Myths, Memories and Fantasy	Charlotte Mei	
2024	Up in Smoke	John Booth and CAN	
2024	Human Stories: Unreported Uprisings	Inès Elsa Dalal	
2024–2025	Socks: The Art of Care and Repair	Celia Pym	
2025	Secret 7 with War Child	Various	
2025	London Festival of Architecture		
