= Johanna Agerman Ross =

Journalist and curator

- Education: London College of Fashion, Royal College of Art
- Occupations: Art historian, curator, journalist
- Employers: Design Museum (2023–); Victoria and Albert Museum (2016–2023)
- Awards: honorary doctorate (University of the Arts London)
- Website: agermanross.co.uk

Johanna Agerman Ross (born 1986) is a journalist, curator, and historian of design. She is the chief curator of the Design Museum in London.

Prior to her role at the Design Museum, she was a curator of 20th century and contemporary design at the Victoria and Albert Museum. During her time at the V&A, she co-curated Plastic: Remaking Our World, helped found the research programme Make Good: Rethinking Material Futures, and was responsible for the Design 1900-Now galleries which opened in 2021.

She is also the founder of the design journal Disegno.

The University of the Arts London awarded Agerman Ross an honorary doctorate in 2025.
