= Sara Shakeel =

Pakistani Artist

- Occupation: Artist
- Notable work: Glitter Stretch Marks, The Big Day album cover
- Style: 2- and 3-dimensional collage, glitter, crystals
- Website: sarashakeel.com

Sara Shakeel is a Pakistani contemporary artist based in London. She is known for using glass crystals to create both digital and physical collages on photography and three-dimensional objects.

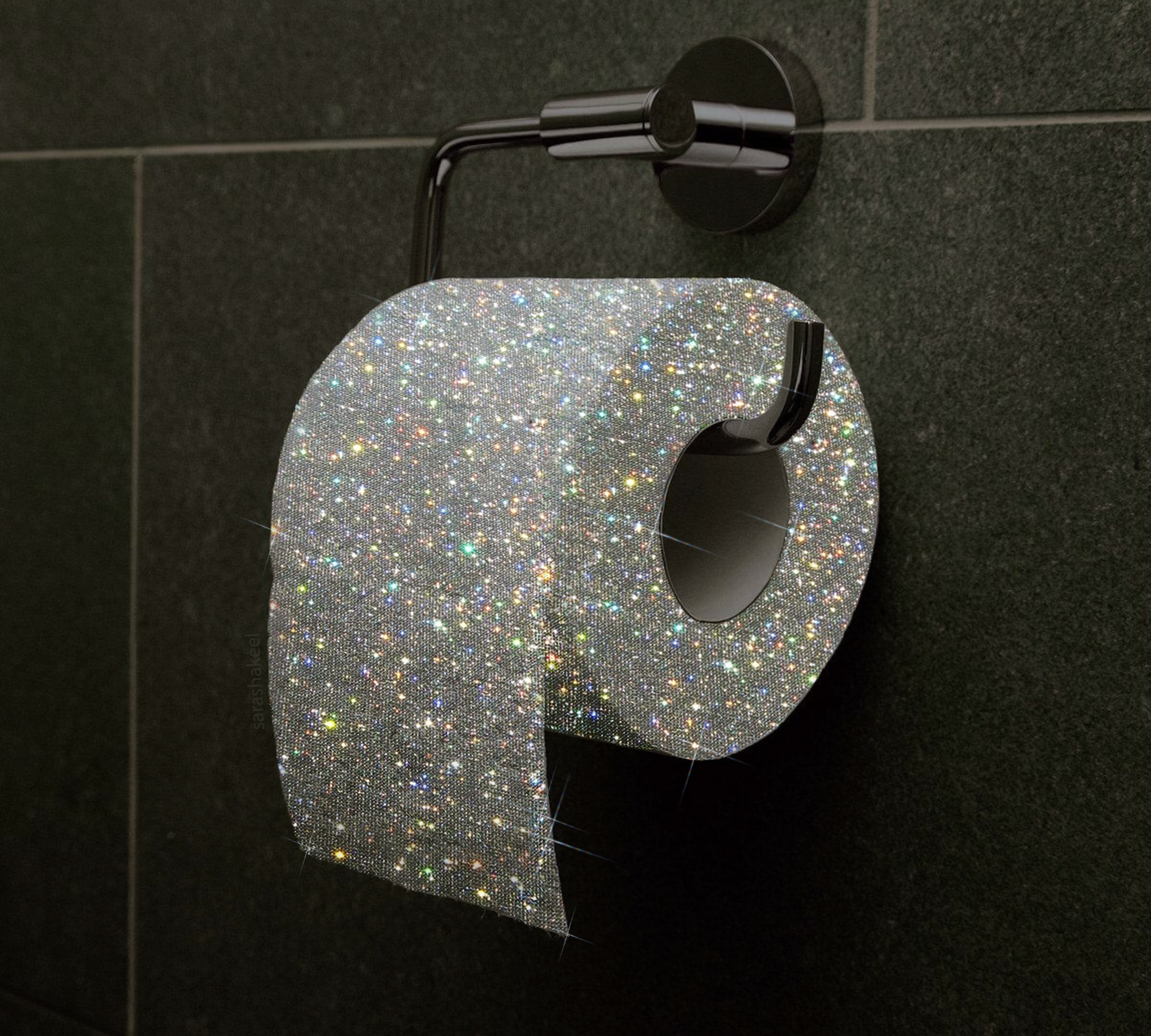
Sara Shakeel first notable artworks

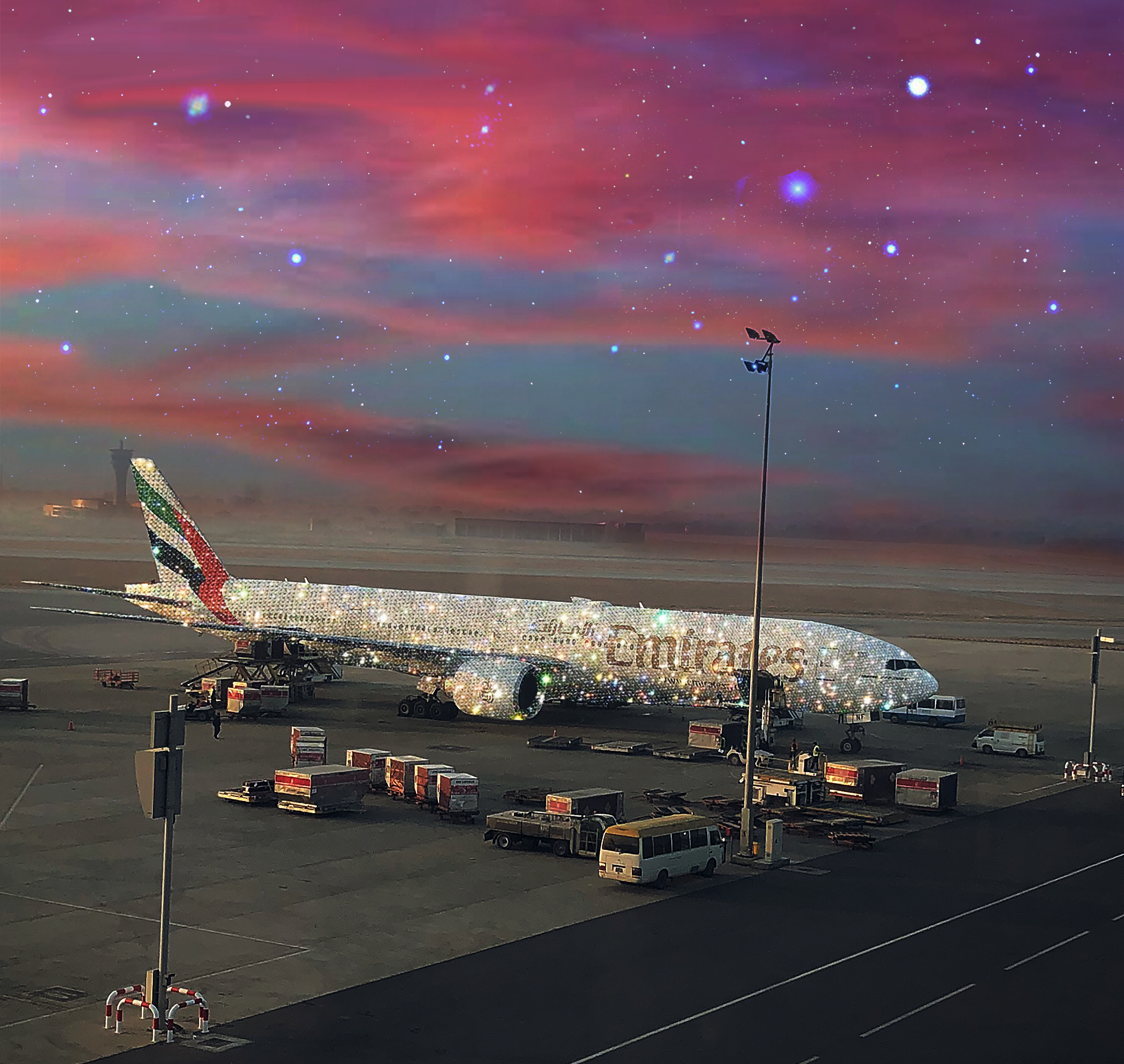
Sara Shakeel diamond plane went viral on social media & local news channels.

== Artistic career ==
Shakeel first taught herself Photoshop and began using her artwork as an outlet for her emotions. Shakeel began posting her art on the social media platform Instagram where she gained a following of over one million followers. In the fall of 2019, Shakeel released a capsule clothing collection in collaboration with the London-based retailer Browns as well as displaying her piece The Great Supper in their store.

=== Glitter Stretch Marks ===
Shakeel's first body of work was posted on Instagram under the hashtag #glitterstretchmarks. Shakeel superimposed gold glitter, crystals, and galaxies onto images of stretch marks. By covering these stretch marks in glitter and crystals, Shakeel's goal was to promote body positivity and empowerment by taking something often seen as an imperfection and turning it into art. In 2019, Shakeel collaborated with Reebok to create an ad for their body image awareness campaign in which she covered the muscles of athlete Jamie Green with Swarovski crystals.

=== Work with Chance the Rapper ===
Shakeel created the cover art for Chance the Rapper's album The Big Day. For this piece, Shakeel created a physical CD from glass and resin, then covered it in crystals. The object was then photographed and used for the cover art and promotion. Along with the album art, Chance the Rapper commissioned Shakeel to create work for a pop-up exhibition and retail experience coinciding with his record release titled "The Big Store". In this pop-up, each room drew influence from the rapper's life experiences such as his childhood and his wedding day. Much of the artwork in this exhibition was created by Shakeel, who used thousands of Swarovski crystals to completely cover tables, chairs, dinnerware, microphone stands, toys, and more.

=== The Great Supper ===
In 2019, Shakeel created the installation sculpture The Great Supper for an exhibition at NOW Gallery in London. Her inspiration was Leonardo da Vinci's painting The Last Supper and her own memories of eating around the dinner table with her family. She references the importance of the Urdu word gupshup, loosely translated to mean socially-bonding and important conversation. Shakeel received the annual Young Artist's Commission from the NOW Gallery for this piece in 2019.

=== Response to Coronavirus ===
Shakeel created a series of images related to hand washing in response to the 2019–20 outbreak of COVID-19. In these images, the water coming from the spout is collaged with crystals and glitter in an attempt to bring a positive impact on people's lives during a difficult time. Shakeel's glittery hand washing images have been used in several blogs and news outlets, including Elle Canada, detailing the best practices for hand washing to prevent the spread of the virus. She also created a series of images featuring health care workers surrounded by glitter and crystals. The original images were sent in via submission to Shakeel.

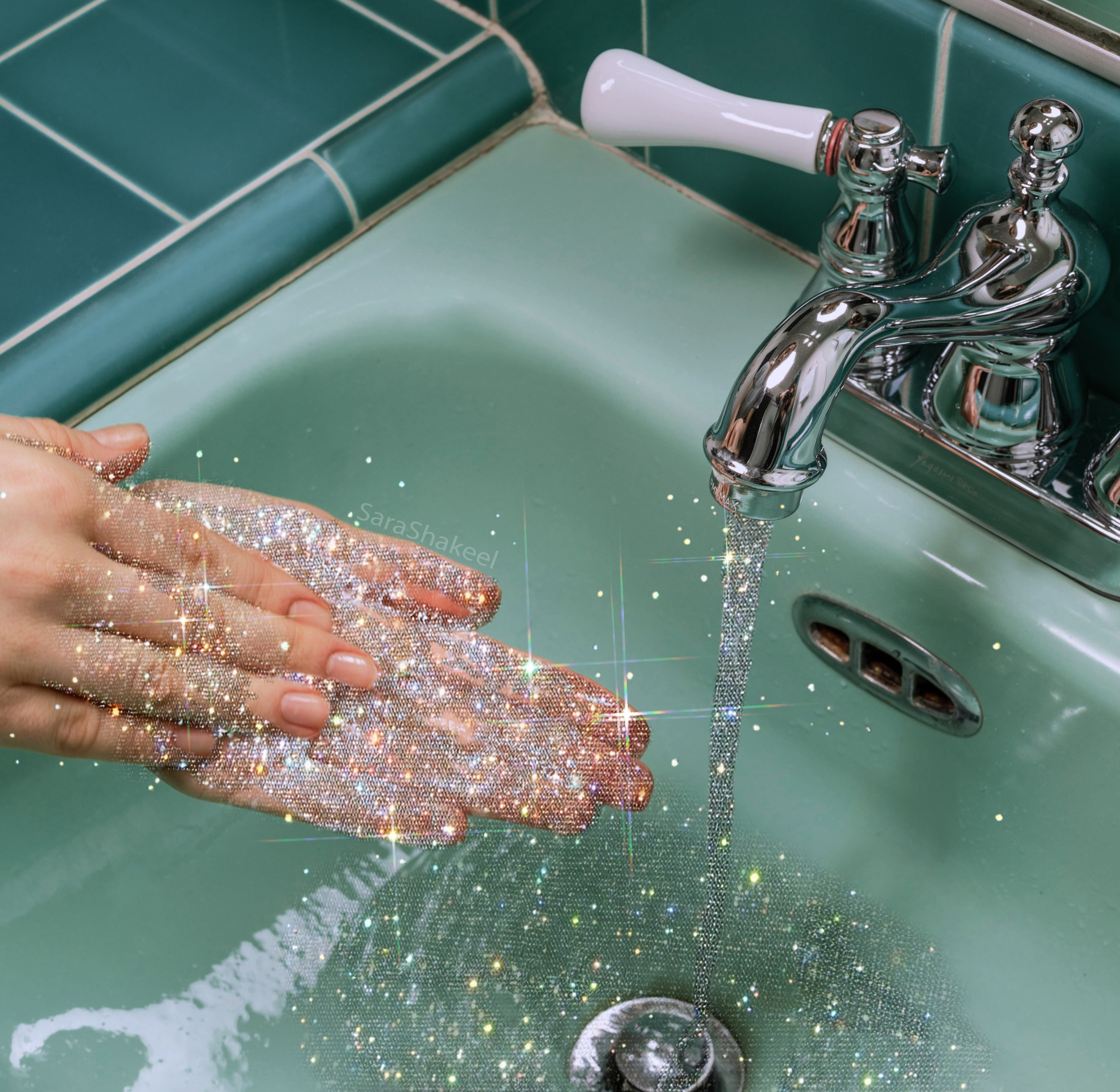
Sara Shakeel iconic artwork " Wash your hands" series in response to Covid-19
