= Lewis Cubitt =

British architect

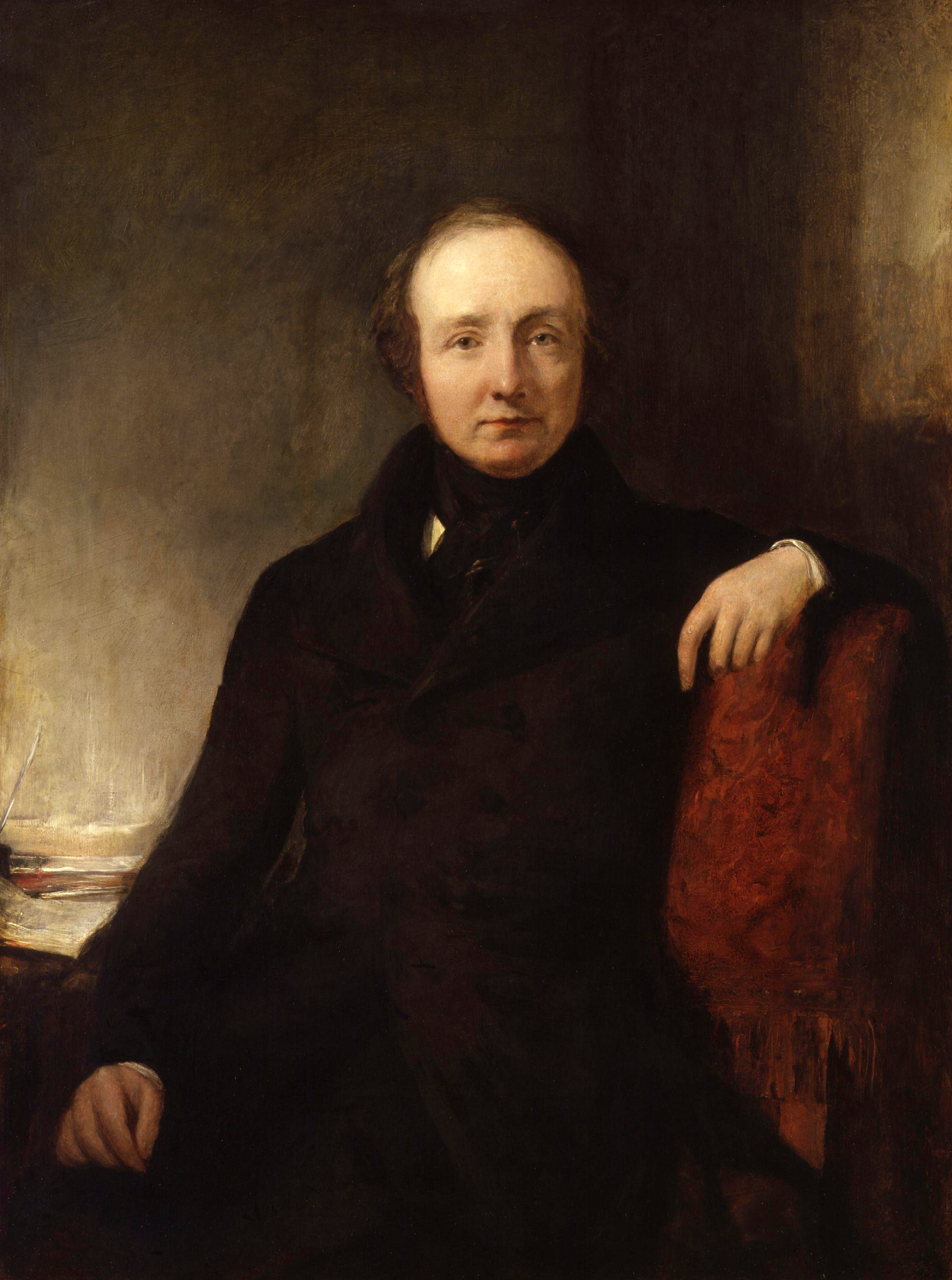
Portrait of Lewis Cubitt by William Boxall, 1845

Lewis Cubitt (29 September 1799 – 9 June 1883) was an English civil engineer and architect.

== Life ==
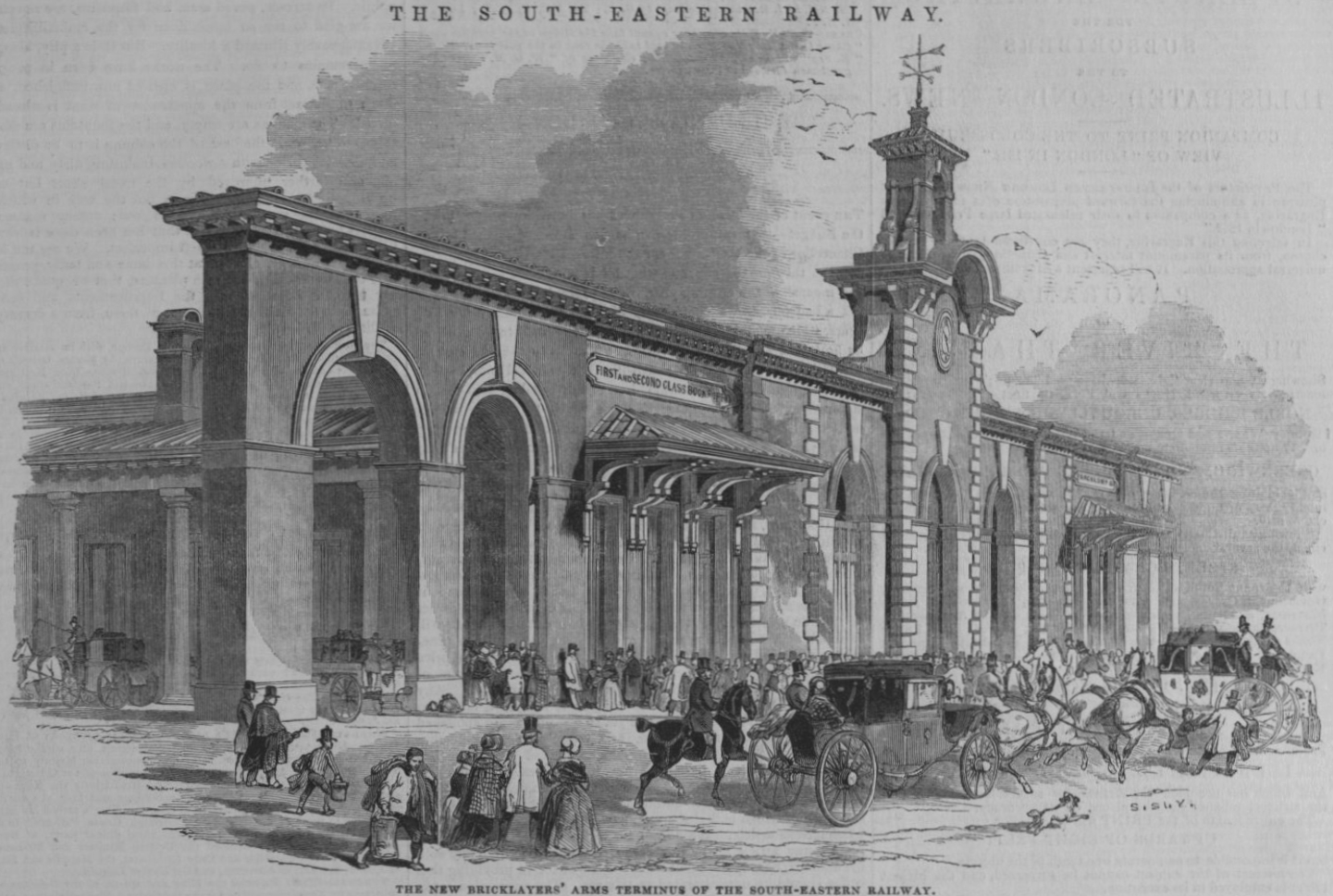
Bricklayers Arms, 1844

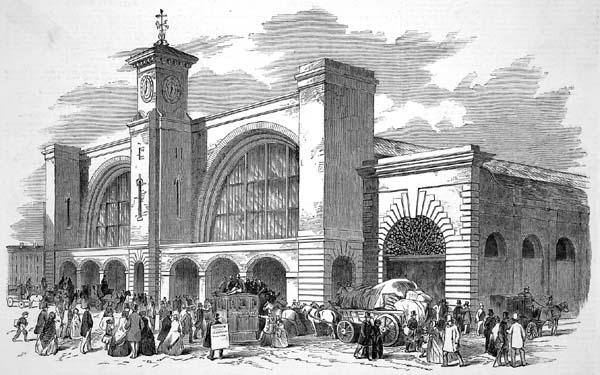
King's Cross station, 1852

He was a younger brother of Thomas Cubitt, the leading master builder in London in the second quarter of the 19th century, and he designed many of the housing developments constructed by his sibling. He also was a younger brother of William Cubitt, the Lord Mayor of London.

He built many bridges in his career, most of them being in South America, Australia and India. Lewis was jointly responsible for designing the rebuilt London Bridge railway station in 1844. He also designed Bricklayers Arms (1844) and King's Cross railway stations (1851–52) and the Great Northern Hotel (1854).

== Legacy ==
As part of the ongoing redevelopment of the adjoining railway lands, now known as King's Cross Central, a granary designed by Cubitt has been refurbished as the main campus facility for Central Saint Martins, a constituent college of the University of the Arts London. The structural rivet Cubitt used in his development of the granary inspired the hinges used by eyewear brand Cubitts, who are named after the Cubitt brothers.

Lewis Cubbitt Square and Lewis Cubitt Park, in the London Borough of Camden commemorate Cubitt's work in the area.

== Family ==
He married Sophia Kendall (1811-1879) on 23 January 1830.
