= Design Museum =

Art museum in London, England

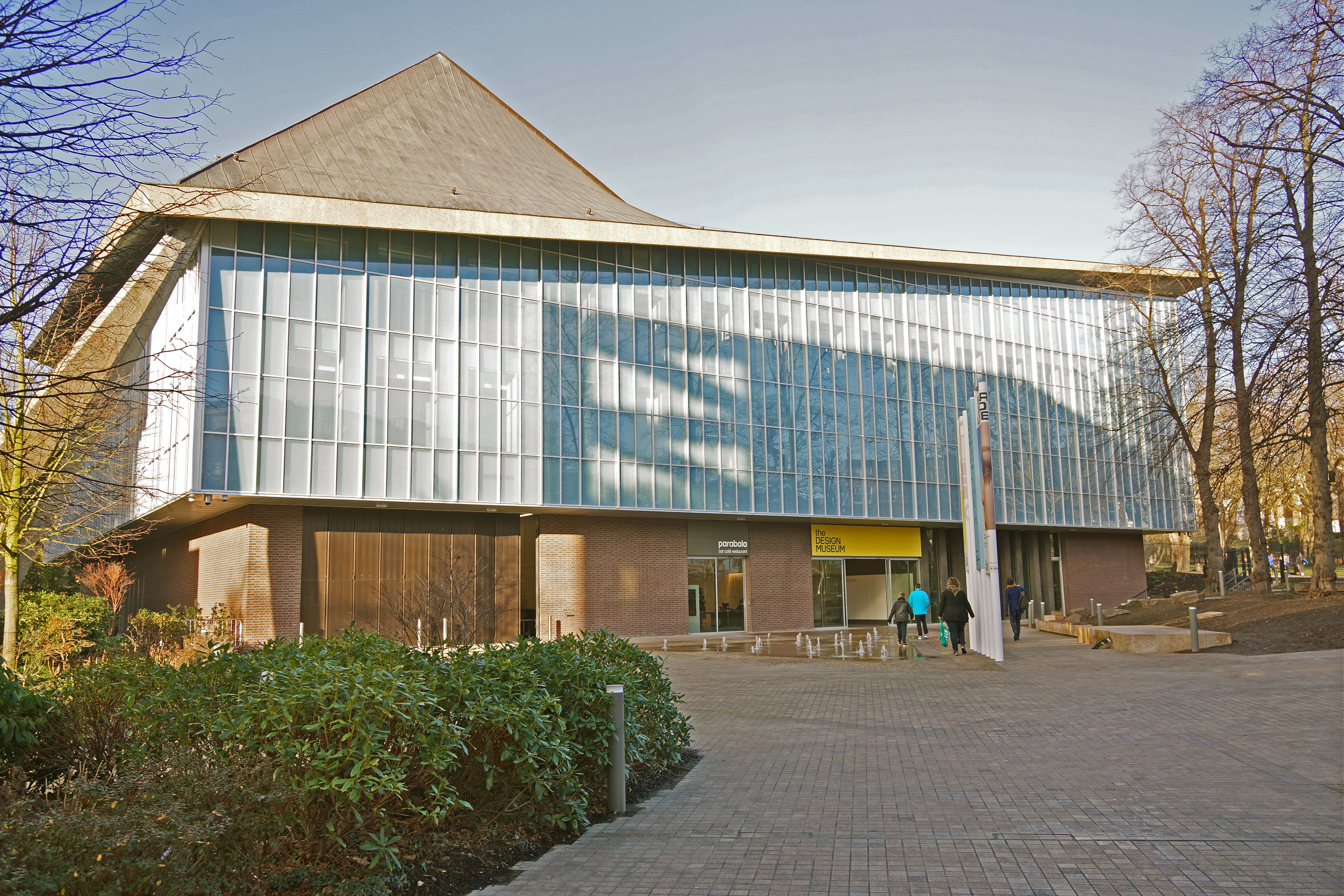
- The Museum's Kensington High Street facing façade
- Established: 1989; 37 years ago
- Location: 224–238 Kensington High Street, London, W8 6AG; England
- Coordinates: 51.4998973°N 0.200244°W
- Director: Tim Marlow
- Curator: Johanna Agerman Ross
- Public transit access: High Street Kensington; 9, 23, 27, 28, 49, C1
- Website: designmuseum.org

The Design Museum in Kensington, London, England, exhibits product, industrial, graphic, fashion, and architectural design. In 2018, the museum won the European Museum of the Year Award. The museum operates as a registered charity, and all funds generated by ticket sales aid the museum in curating new exhibitions.

== History ==
The museum was founded in 1989 by Sir Terence Conran, with Stephen Bayley as inaugural CEO, after the two men had collaboratively created the highly successful exhibition space known as The Boilerhouse at the Victoria and Albert Museum (V&A).

=== Shad Thames site ===
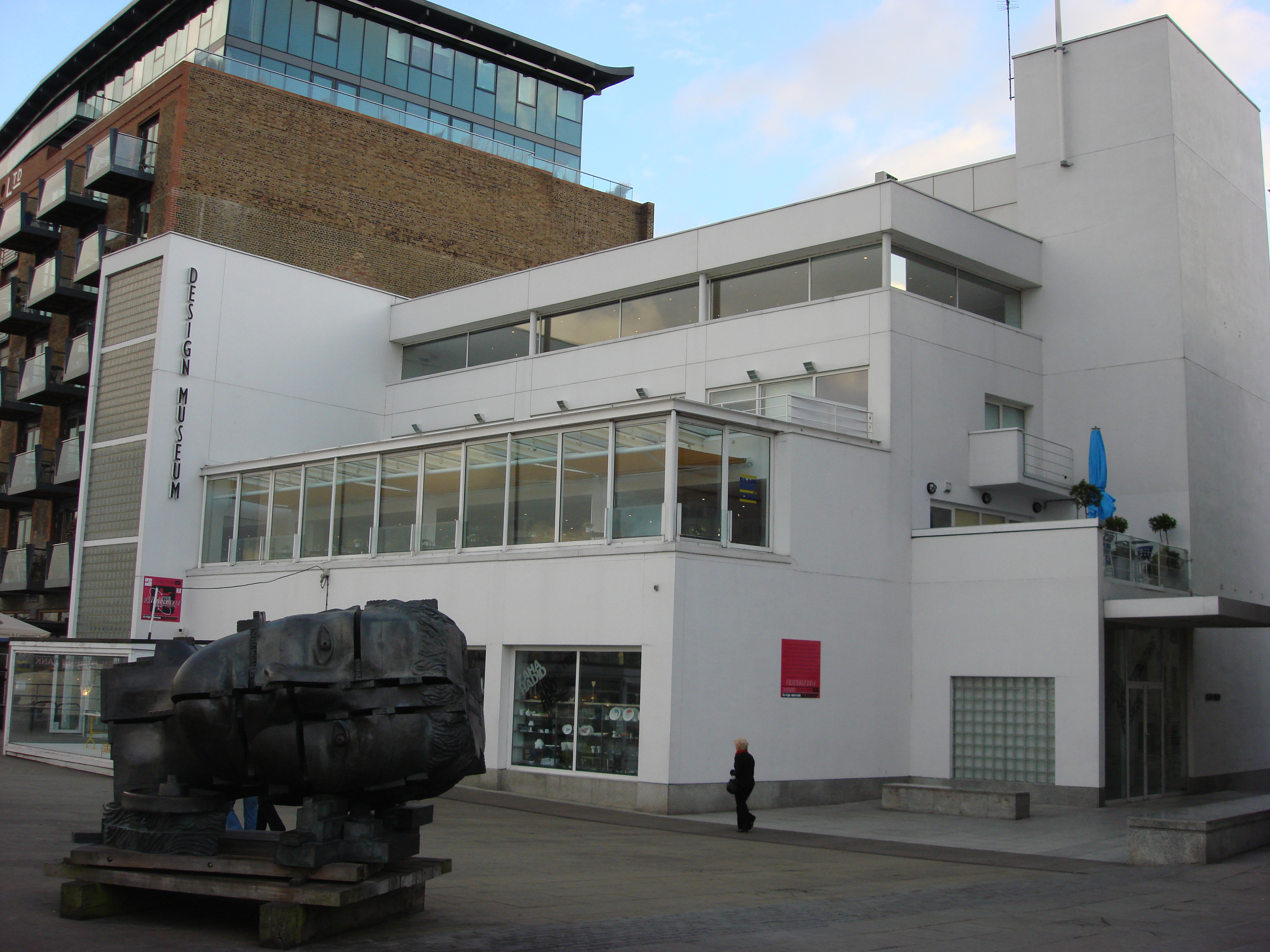
The Design Museum at Shad Thames, 2007

The museum was originally housed in a former 1940s banana warehouse on the south bank of the River Thames in the Shad Thames area of London. The conversion of this warehouse altered it beyond recognition, to resemble a building in the International Modernist style of the 1930s. This was funded by many companies, designers and benefactors. The museum was principally designed by the Conran group, with exhibitions over two floors, and a "Design Museum Tank" exhibition space out by the waterfront. A large scale sculpture titled The Head of Invention by Sir Eduardo Paolozzi was installed in the area between the museum and the Thames.

=== Kensington site ===
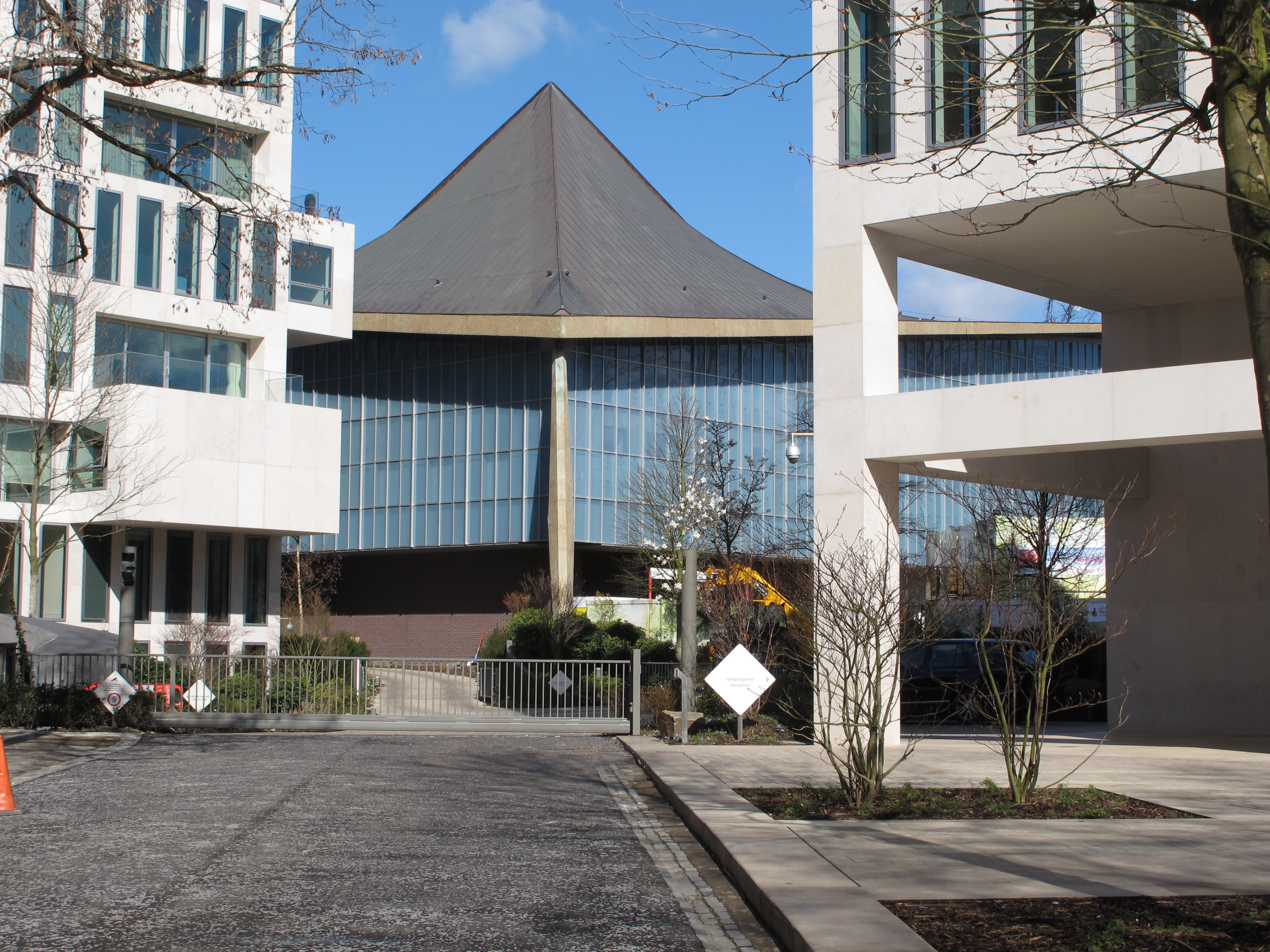
The Design Museum in Kensington

Architect's model of "Tent in the Park", Design Museum

In June 2011, Sir Terence Conran donated £17.5 million to enable the museum to move in 2016 from the warehouse to a larger site which formerly housed the Commonwealth Institute in west London. This landmark from the 1960s, a Grade II* listed building, designed by Robert Matthew/Sir Robert Matthew, Johnson-Marshall and Partners architects that had stood vacant for over a decade, was developed by a design team led by John Pawson. Fit-out of the Design Museum's new home was carried out by Willmott Dixon Interiors.

The Design Museum opened in its Kensington location on 24 November 2016. The move gave the museum three times more space than in its previous location at Shad Thames, with the new Swarovski Foundation Centre for Learning, 202-seat Bakala Auditorium and a dedicated gallery to display its permanent collection, accessible free of charge. The new building was the subject of a profile on the Sky Arts programme The Art of Architecture in 2019.

The move brought the museum into Kensington's cultural quarter, joining the Royal College of Art, V&A, Science Museum, Natural History Museum and Serpentine Gallery.

Deyan Sudjic succeeded Alice Rawsthorn as director of the Design Museum in 2006. In 2016, Alice Black was appointed co-director. In 2019, Tim Marlow was appointed as director and chief executive.

== Galleries ==
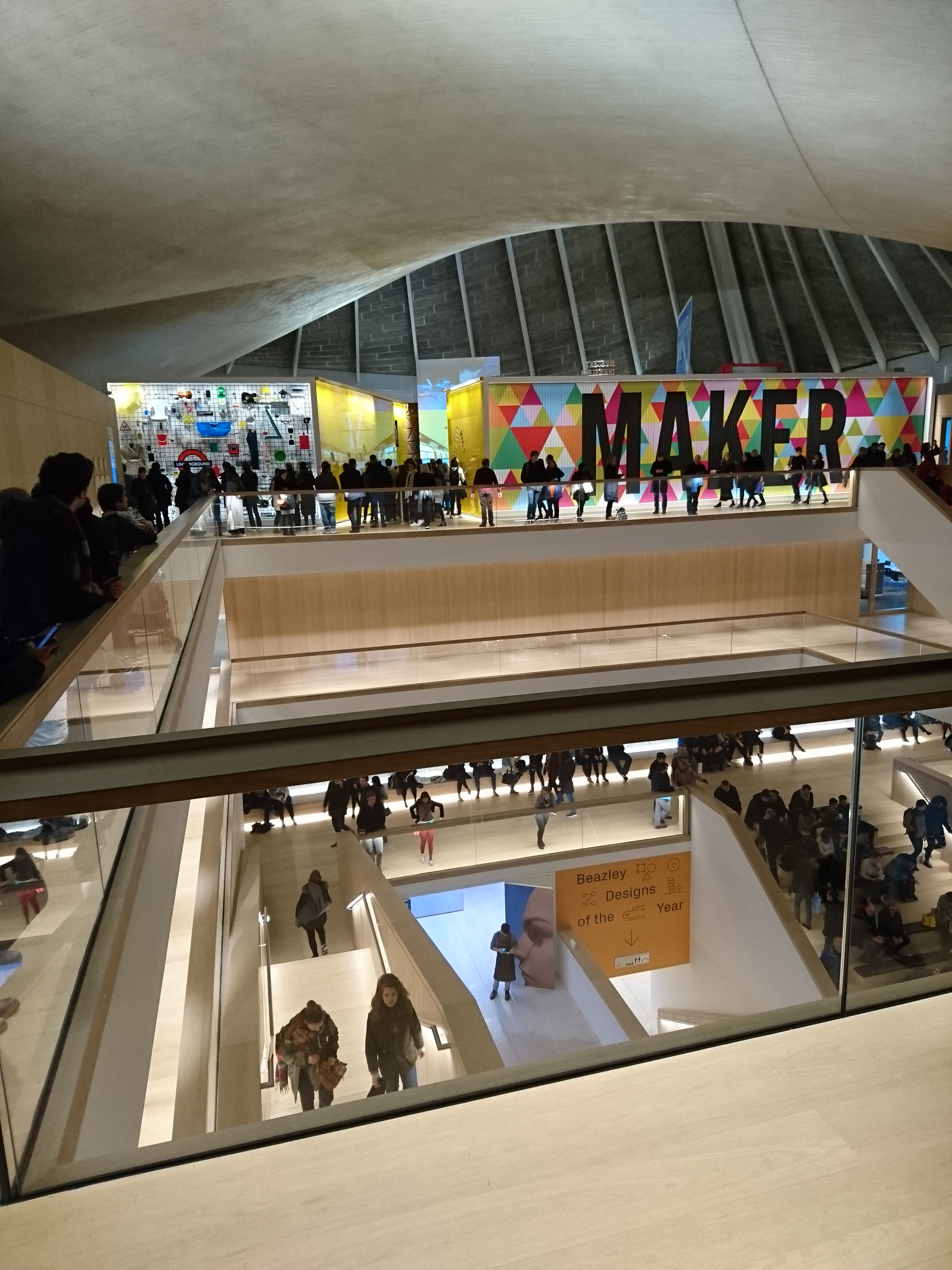
View across the top floor

The top-floor space under the museum roof houses a permanent display, Designer Maker User, with key objects from the museum's collection. A restaurant, residency studio and an events and gallery space are also located on the top floor.

On the first floor, a design and architecture reference library is a resource for students, educators, researchers and designers. It also includes archive material relating to the history of the museum. The Swarovski Foundation Centre for Learning is a suite of learning facilities including a design studio, creative workshop, two seminar rooms and a common room. The Design Museum offices and main reception, a meeting room and a film studio are also located on the first floor.

On the ground floor, the largest gallery in the Design Museum showcases a programme of temporary exhibitions. Accessible from both Kensington High Street and Holland Park, the atrium acts as an events space. A main staircase from the atrium gives access to all floors and offers views to the first and second floors and the hyperbolic paraboloid roof.

A double-height space spanning the two lower levels, Gallery Two hosts a programme of temporary exhibitions dedicated to architecture, fashion, furniture, product and graphic design. The Bakala Auditorium seats 202 people and provide a purpose-designed space for a programme of talks, seminars, debates and public and private events throughout the year. The basement accommodates a collections store, exhibition preparation spaces and a locker area for visitors.

== Award schemes ==
The Design Museum has an award scheme which Brit Insurance sponsored from 2003 until 2011.

=== Designer of the Year ===
- 2003: Jony Ive
- 2004: Daniel Brown
- 2005: Hilary Cottam
- 2006: Jamie Hewlett

=== Design of the Year ===
Designs produced over the previous 12 months worldwide are eligible. A number of design experts are invited to nominate up to five projects each, falling into the seven categories of architecture, transport, graphics, interactive, product, furniture and fashion. Since 2015, there have been six categories: architecture, fashion, graphics, digital, product and transport. Beazley became exhibition sponsor in 2016.

- 2008 The 'One Laptop Per Child' project, designed by Yves Béhar for Fuseproject
- 2009 Barack Obama poster designed by Shepard Fairey
- 2010 Folding Plug designed by Min-Kyu Choi
- 2011 Plumen 001 lightbulb, designed by Samuel Wilkinson and Hulger
- 2012 The London 2012 Olympic Torch, designed by BarberOsgerby
- 2013 The website "GOV.UK", designed by the Government Digital Service
- 2014 The Heydar Aliyev Center in Baku, Azerbaijan designed by architect Zaha Hadid
- 2015 Human-organs-on-Chips designed by Donald Ingber and Dan Dongeun Huh
- 2020 Teeter-Totter Wall, designed by California-based architects Ronald Rael and Virginia San Fratello.

=== PLATFORM ===
In 2025 the museum launched PLATFORM, an annual exhibition of the work of a selected designer in an year-long display "dedicated to showcasing contemporary design practice." The recipients of this honour are:

- PLATFORM: Bethan Laura Wood (2025)
- PLATFORM 2: Simone Brewster (2026)
Tropical Noir (c. 2015) in the museum's PLATFORM 2 exhibition, 2026

Simone Brewster Negress (photograph) and Negrita

Mahogany bust purchased at Shepherd's Bush Market by the artist's parents in the 1960s

== See also ==
- British Council – Organisation promoting cultural and linguistic knowledge of the United Kingdom
- Crafts Council – United Kingdom charity for craft
- Design Council – British organization
- List of design museums – Type of museum
