= London 2012 Olympic Torch =

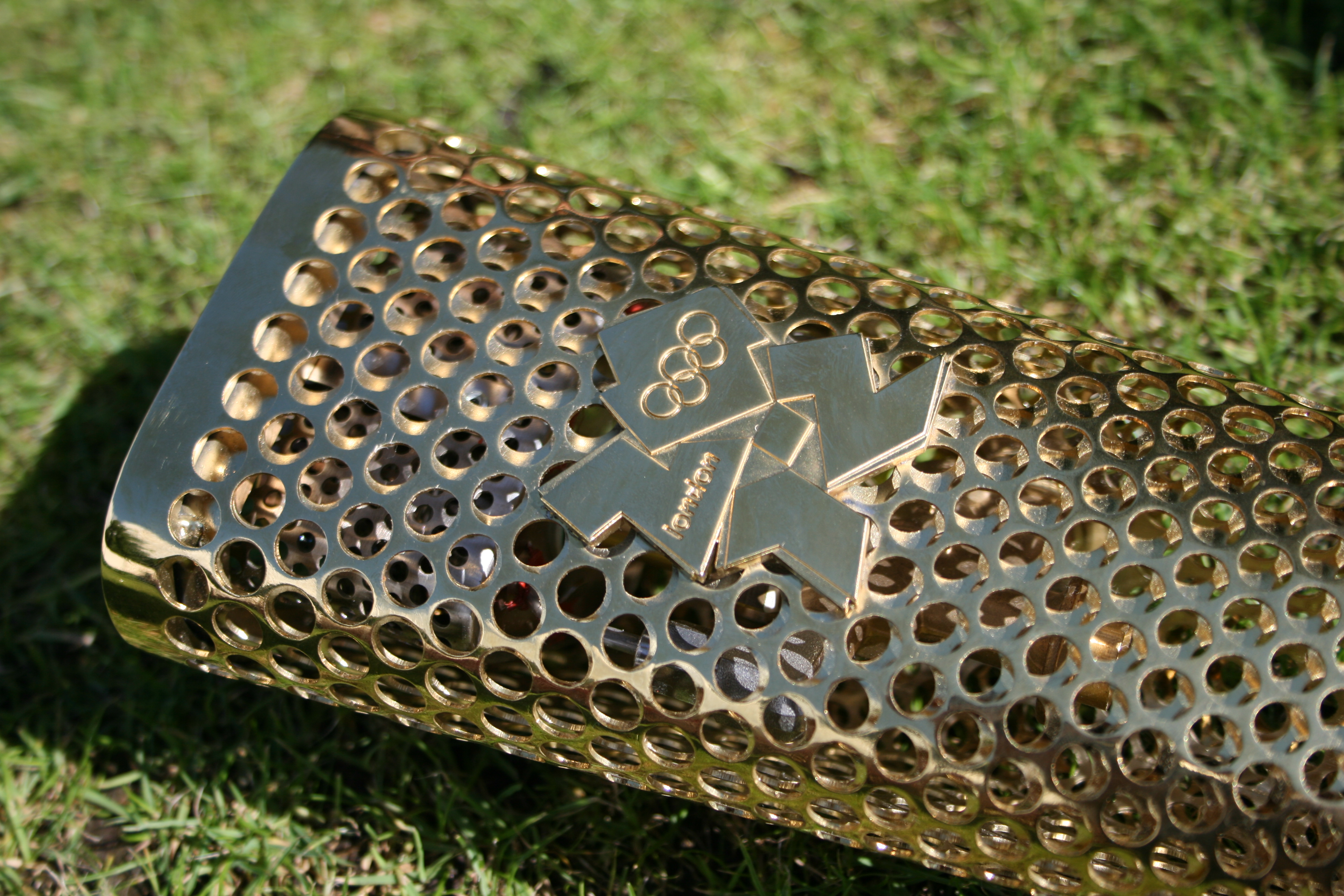
London 2012 Olympic Torch Design

The London 2012 Olympic Torch was carried around the UK for 70 days in the London 2012 Torch Relay, from 19 May to 27 July 2012.

== Design ==
Designed by British designers Edward Barber and Jay Osgerby, it has a triangular form that was developed in recognition of a pattern of trinities relating to the Olympic Games: the London 2012 Olympic Games are the third London Olympics (1908, 1948, 2012); the Olympic Motto is 'Faster, Higher, Stronger'; and the Vision for London 2012 was to unite 'sport, education and culture'.

The shape of the torch makes it easily gripped, as does its textured surface, which is perforated with 8,000 holes. The holes represent the 8,000 runners in the London 2012 Torch Relay and the 8,000-mile (13,000 km) relay distance. Functionally, they reduce the torch's overall weight and ensure that heat from its flame is dissipated without conducting down the handle. They create a level of transparency in the torch, where one can see through to the flame and burner mechanism, and they also allow a 'fuller' flame that escapes from all sides of the Torch, rather than solely from the top, where the flame can tend to be flattened when a torchbearer runs.

The torch has two layers: an inner and an outer 'skin' with 3,600 and 4,400 holes respectively, held in place by a top and a bottom casting. The pattern created by the perforations and the overlapping layers was inspired by the Olympic rings. The components are laser-welded together and the holes are laser cut. The torch has been specifically designed to be as lightweight as possible. This is important as half of the torchbearers are young people, some aged just 12. The torch can withstand temperatures of up to 40 degrees C and down to -5 degrees C.

Tecosim, the German headquartered product engineering company was the engineering partner of the Olympic Torch. They carried out stringent testing to ensure that the design could stay alight in wind, rain and snow; any weather that a British summer could produce. Their Basildon based division product engineers along with the Birmingham-based LPG specialists and manufacturers, Bullfinch; and the Coventry manufacturers Premier Sheet Metal have all taken the design and moved it into mass production.

The London 2012 Torch is one of the lightest Olympic torches. It is made from gold PVD-finished aluminium. A torch was produced for every torchbearer (8,000); each weighs around 1,000 g (35 oz) and stands 800 mm (31 in) tall. The weight was achieved to ensure the torch was able to be easily carried by bearers of all ages; the youngest torchbearer in the relay was twelve, and the oldest 100 years. Its height allows it to be easily viewed over the top of crowds.

The London 2012 Paralympic Torch is the same design, albeit with a mirror-finish.

The Olympic Torch is held in the permanent collections of the V&A, the Design Museum in London, the Olympic Museum in Lausanne, Switzerland and in the private collection of the Royal College of Art, London.

== Reaction ==
The design of the torch has been widely acclaimed. The Torch was named the Design Museum's 2012 'Design of the Year'.
