= Phoebe English =

English fashion designer

Phoebe English is an English fashion designer and head of her eponymous brand of women's wear and menswear.

== Early life and education ==
English grew up "100 metres away from Shakespeare's birth place in Stratford-upon-Avon" and graduated from Central Saint Martins in 2011 with an MA in fashion design.

== Career ==
During the COVID-19 pandemic, English joined with other fashion designers to provide medical clothing to London hospitals. She has received funding to work on more sustainable fashion, and is one of the designers who supported a proposition to the 2021 United Nations Climate Change Conference (COP26) climate conference. She was one of the artists in the show 'Waste Age' at the Design Museum in London, the timing of the show was set to coincide with the COP26 conference.

In 2016, English participated in the London Fashion Week Men's show and her shift into men's clothing was highlighted by The New York Times who noted she was one of five designers to watch that year.

In 2017, her work was presented in the Victoria and Albert Museum in the Raphael Gallery. Her pieces are in the permanent collection of the Victoria and Albert Museum, and the National Museum of Scotland.

In 2019 she presented her archive collections in miniature in the Morley College Gallery.

English collaborated with the British clothing company Toast on an upcycled capsule collection released in 2024. She worked with returned items that could no longer be sold, irreparable garments, faulty pieces and leftover stock from the retailer, reconstructing them into new clothing. The project was intended to demonstrate how existing garments could be treated as material for further design rather than as waste.

== Awards and honours ==
In 2012, English received Vauxhall Fashion Scout's Merit Award to recognize her participation in the 'Ones to Watch' show. She was named to Forbes 30 Under 30 in 2015. In 2021, English was honored with the 'Leaders of Change' award from the British Fashion Council.
