= Piégon =

- Commune
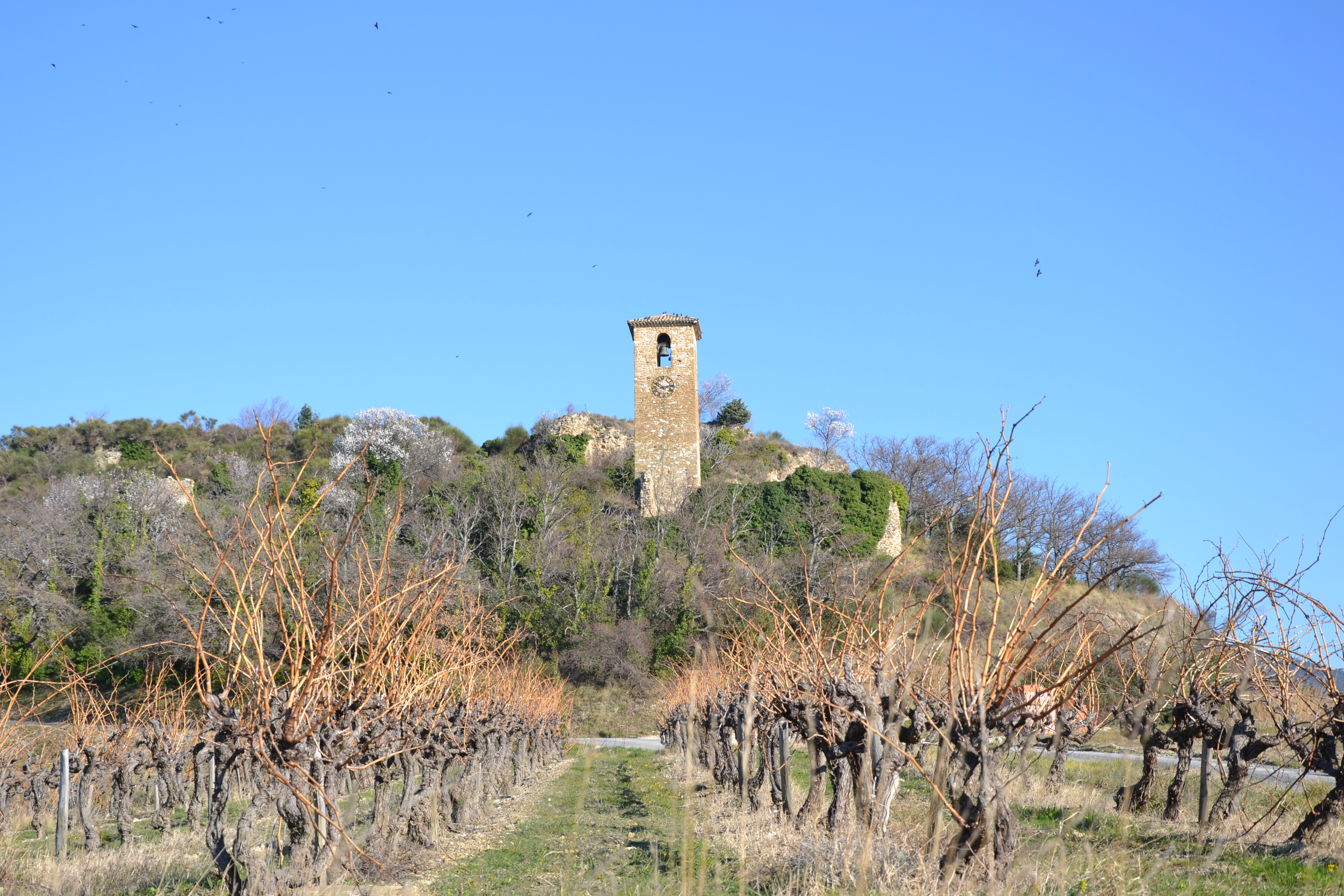
- The bell tower of the old village of Piégon
- Location of Piégon
- Location within France Location within Auvergne-Rhône-Alpes
- Coordinates: 44°18′10″N 5°07′37″E
- Country: France
- Region: Auvergne-Rhône-Alpes
- Department: Drôme
- Arrondissement: Nyons
- Canton: Nyons et Baronnies

Government
  - Mayor (2020–2026): Serge Roux
- Area^{1}: 10.21 km^{2} (3.94 sq mi)
- Highest elevation: 805 m (2,641 ft)
- Lowest elevation: 259 m (850 ft)
- Population (2023): 240
  - Density: 24/km^{2} (61/sq mi)
- Time zone: UTC+01:00 (CET)
  - Summer (DST): UTC+02:00 (CEST)
- INSEE/Postal code: 26233 /26110
- ^{1} French Land Register data, which excludes lakes, ponds, glaciers > 1 km^{2} (0.386 sq mi or 247 acres) and river estuaries.

Piégon (French pronunciation: [pjeɡɔ̃]; Occitan: Pueigon) is a commune in the Drôme department in southeastern France.

== Population ==
Historical population
Year	Pop.	±% p.a.
1968	220	—
1975	205	−1.00%
1982	232	+1.78%
1990	268	+1.82%
1999	274	+0.25%
2007	238	−1.75%
2012	262	+1.94%
2017	260	−0.15%
2023	240	−1.33%
Source: INSEE

== See also ==
- Communes of the Drôme department
