= Design Commons =

Design Commons is a deconstructed conference founded by the CEO of Interactive Africa, Ravi Naidoo in collaboration with World Design Weeks founder Kari Korkman. The event was established in 2017 and acts as a travelling discussion platform on the future of cities.

Unlike the conventional conference format, Design Commons places stakeholders in urban planning and public space at the same table as notable designers to foster a sense of common ground and find solutions to some of the world's pressing issues.

== Background ==
The first Design Commons event took place in Clarion Congress Centre, Helsinki as part of the World Design Weeks summit from 14 to 15 September 2017.

Speakers include architect David Adjaye, Dutch architect Winy Maas, Finnish technology entrepreneur Marko Ahtisaari, Dutch landscape architect Cees van der Veeken and Studio Swine, a collaboration between Japanese architect Azusa Murakami and British artist Alexander Groves.

The event is open to the public and is partially released as a video series on the Design Indaba website.
