= Azusa Murakami =

Japanese architect and artist

- 村上 あずさ
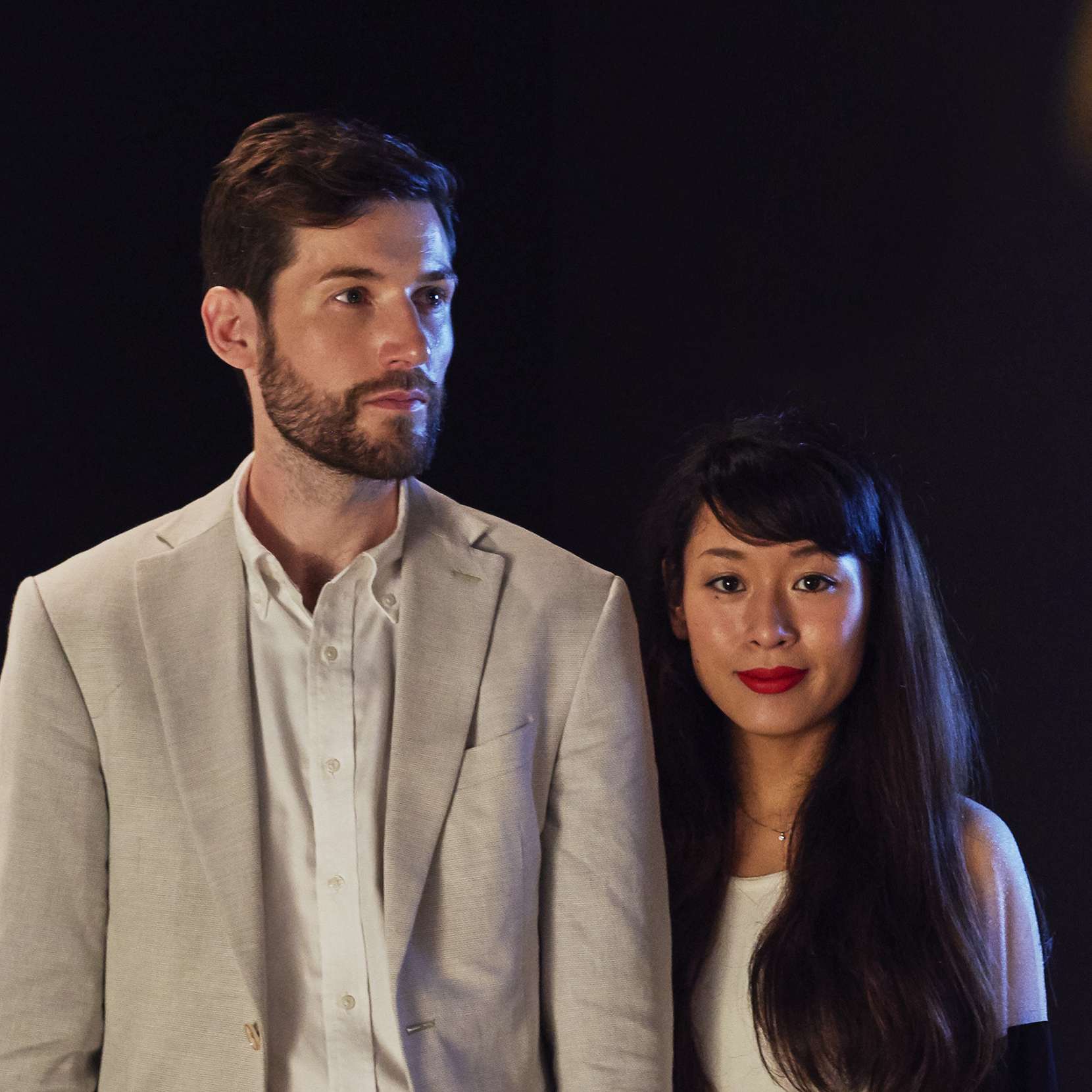
- Murakami in 2014
- Education: Royal College of Art, University College London
- Occupations: Artist, architect, company founder, designer
- Spouse: Alexander Groves
- Website: studioswine.com; aamurakami.com

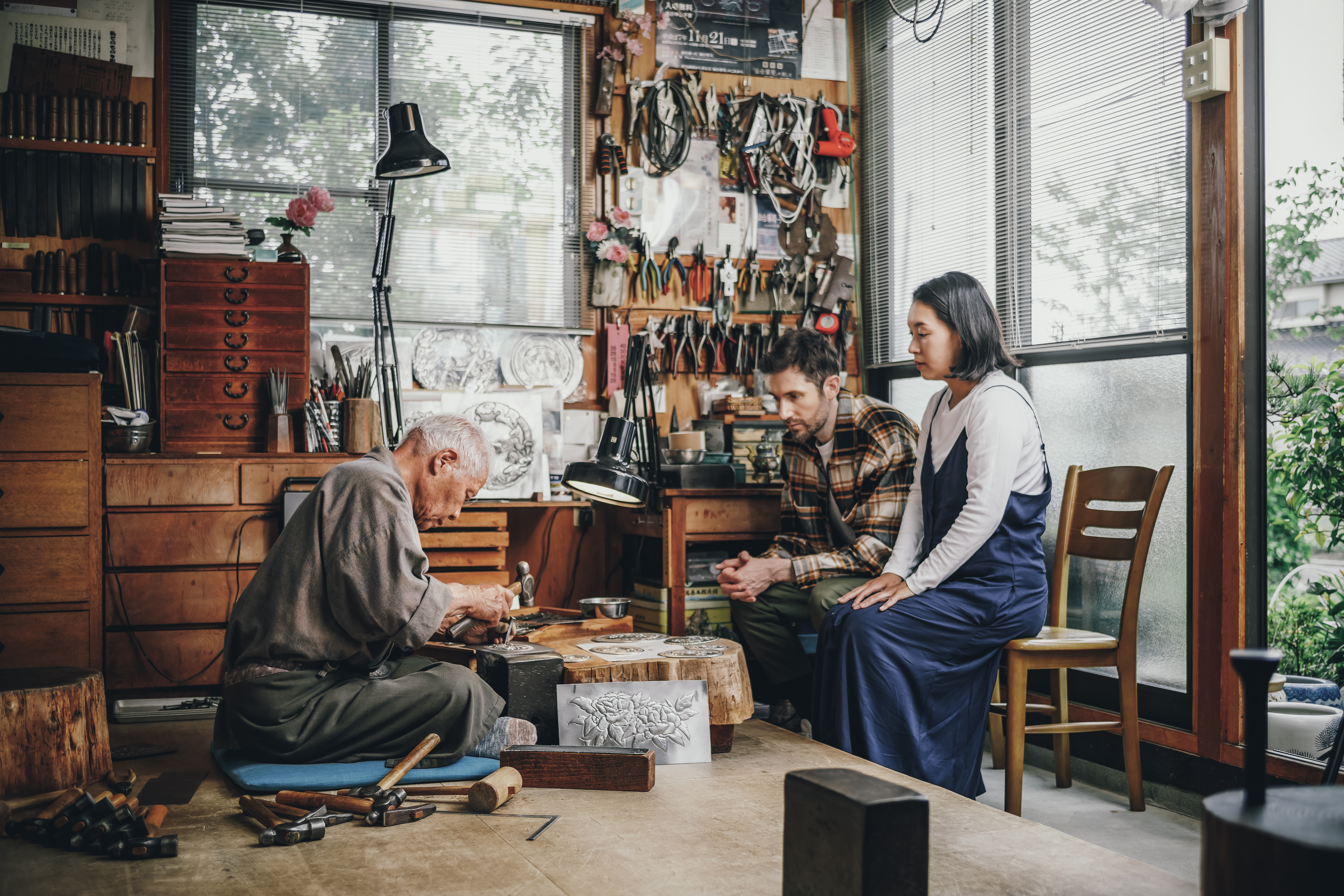
Murakami and Groves with Sendai-Tansu artisan (2024)

Azusa Murakami (村上 あずさ, Murakami Azusa; born 1984) is a Japanese architect, artist, and designer. She is the co-founder of art collectives Studio SWINE and A.A.Murakami.

== Biography ==
Azusa Murakami was born in Aichi Prefecture in 1984.

She graduated from UCL's Bartlett School of Architecture in 2006 with a Bachelor's degree in Architecture. She subsequently attended and graduated from the Royal College of Art with a MA from the Design Products programme in 2010. She was a student of Jurgen Bey and Tord Boontje.

In 2011 she founded the art collective Super Wide Interdisciplinary New Explorers (Studio SWINE) with her husband and partner Alexander Groves. Working together as both SWINE and A.A.Murakami, the duo have created works such as New Spring, Meteorite Shoes, Metropolis I, Sea Chair, and the Humble Administrator’s Chair and Table. Murakami has collaborated with companies such as Swedish brand COS, the BMW group, and participated in the Craft x Tech initiative's Tohoku Project..

Her work is held in private and public collections including the Design Museum Gent, the Museum of Modern Art in New York (MoMA), as well as having been exhibited by other institutions. She was also included in the What is Luxury? exhibition at the Victoria and Albert Museum and participated in the 56th Venice Biennale International Art Exhibition.

Murakami has been recognised with awards from the Cannes Film Festival, Designers of the Future (Swarovski), and Wallpaper* magazine.

She has spoken at Design Indaba, and participated as a member of the jury for the 2019 Dezeen Design Awards.

== Gallery of works ==
Artwork by Studio Swine, Chronicle Tower, London (2019)

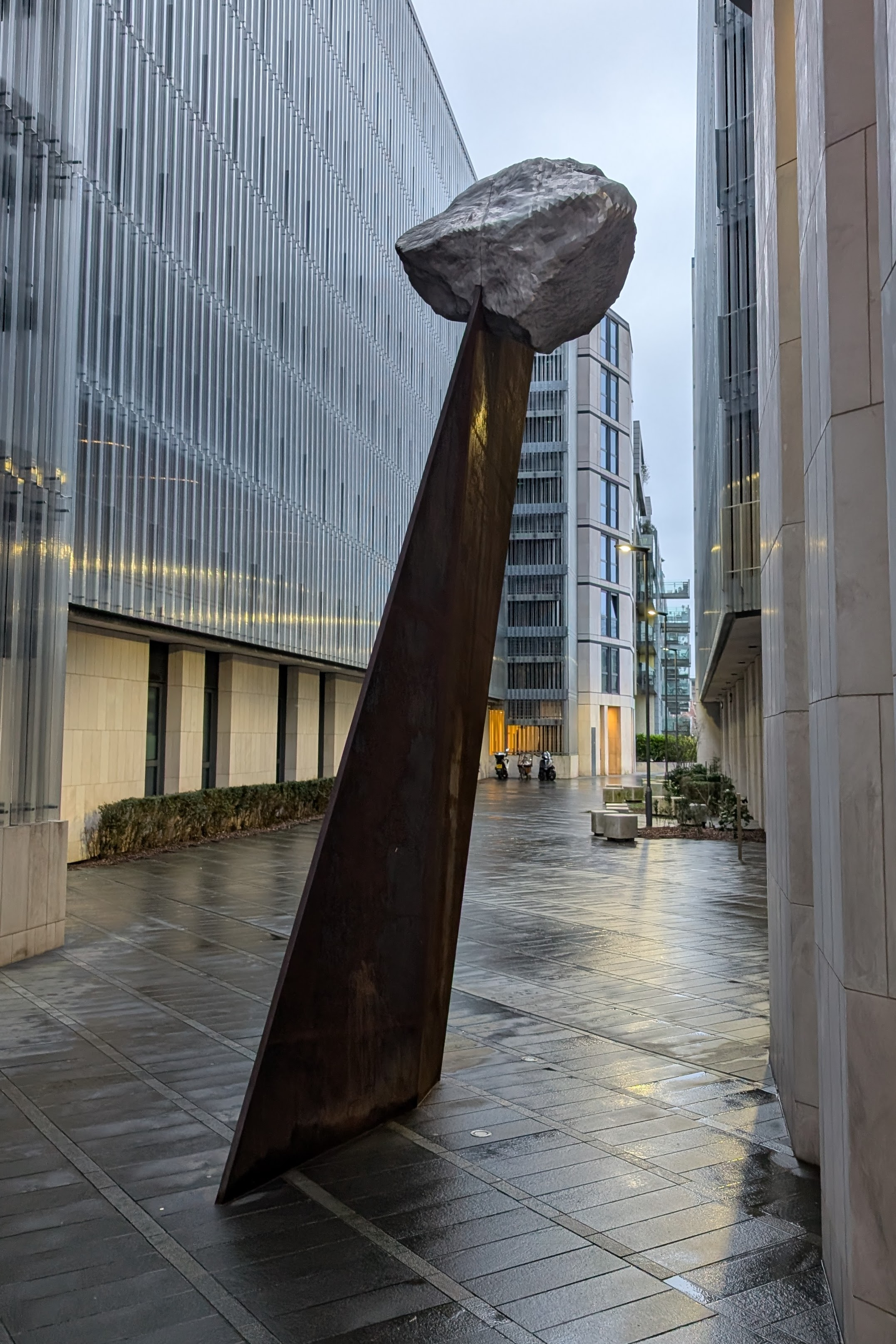
Artwork by Studio Swine, Chronicle Tower, London (2019)

Artwork by Studio Swine in the Victoria and Albert museum, London (2024)
