= Studio Swine =

Art collective and design studio

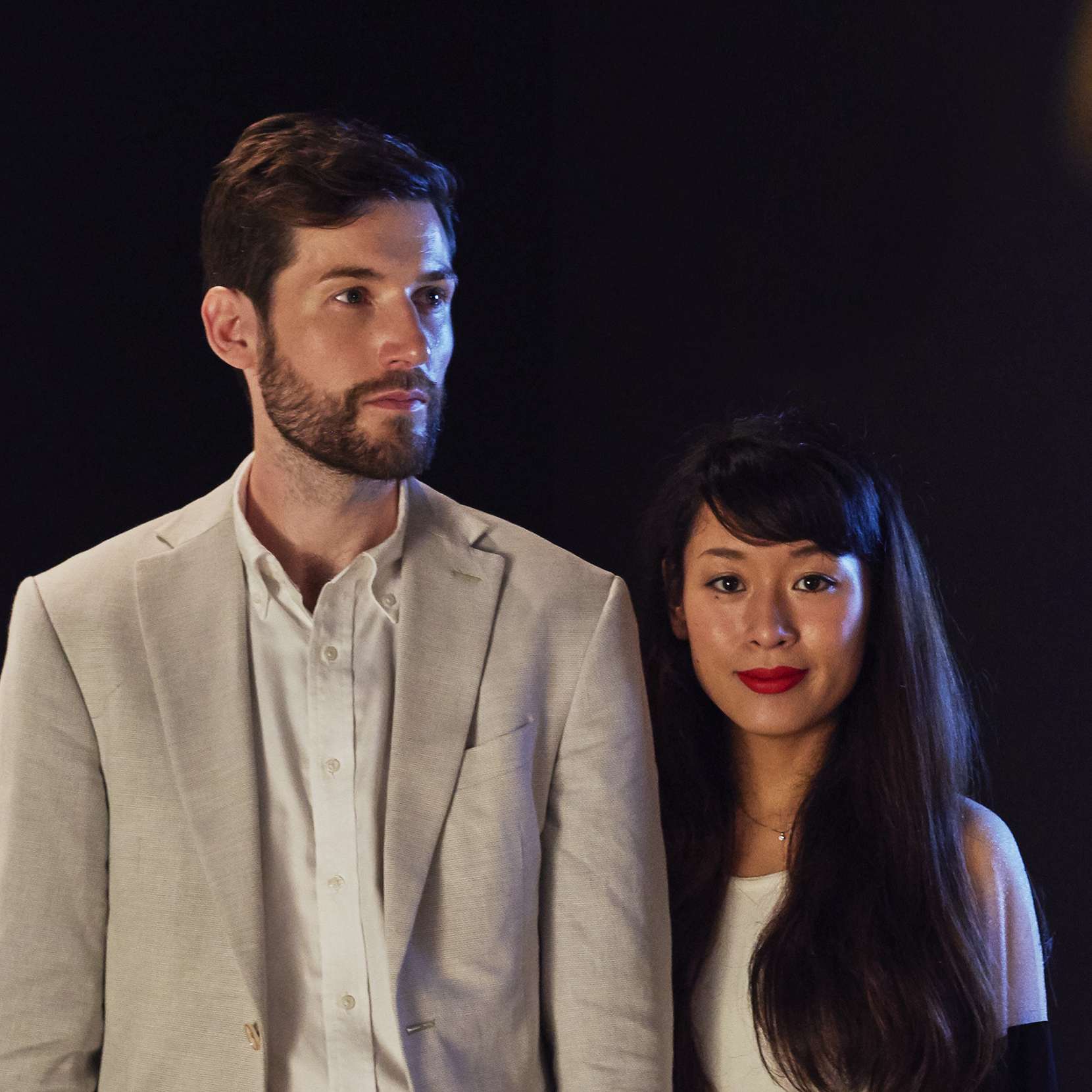
- Azusa Murakami and Alexander Groves (2015)

Practice information
- Founders: Azusa Murakami; Alexander Groves
- Founded: 2011
- Location: London, United Kingdom; Tokyo, Japan
- Affiliations: A.A.Murakami

Website
- studioswine.com aamurakami.com

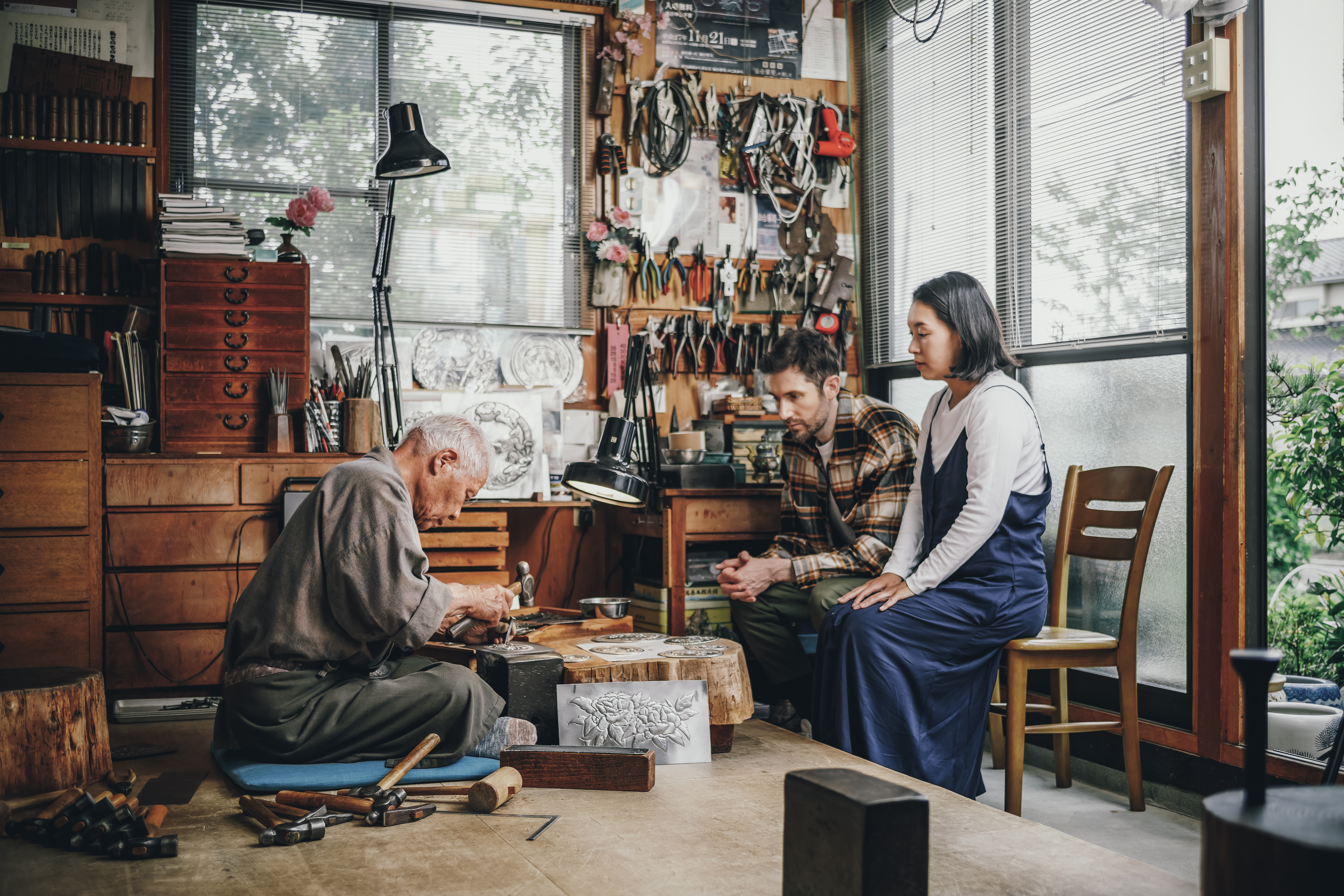
Murakami and Groves visit Sendai-Tansu workshop, Tōhoku, Japan (2024)

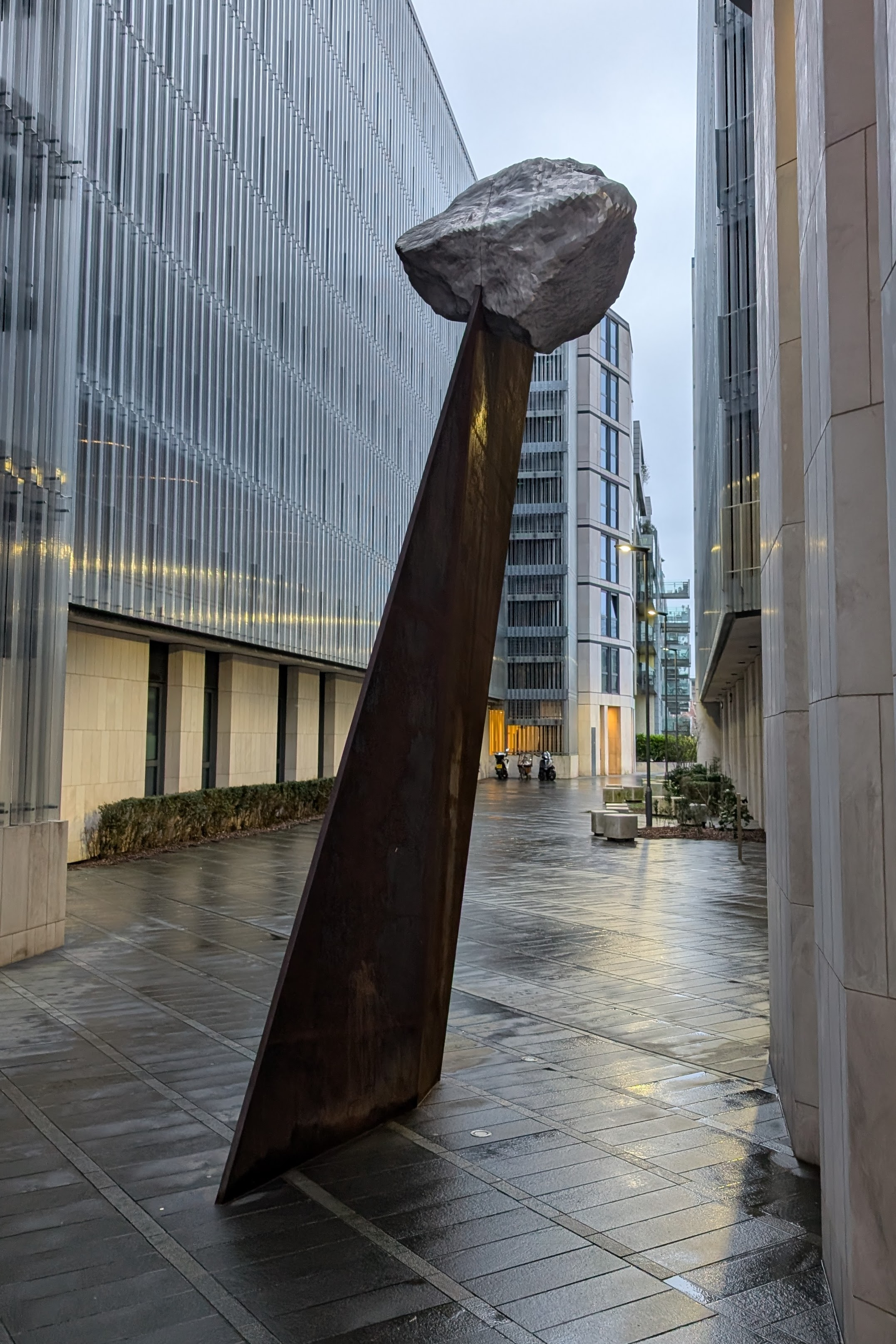
Column by Studio Swine, Chronicle Tower, London (2019)

Studio Swine is a British-Japanese art collective and design studio founded in 2011 by Azusa Murakami and Alexander Groves. SWINE is an acronym for "Super Wide Interdisciplinary New Explorers".

== Background and work ==
Azusa Murakami and Alexander Groves met while studying at the Royal College of Art in London, from which they both received master's degrees in product design. Upon graduation, they founded Studio Swine. Murakami is also an architect who was trained at the Bartlett School of Architecture. Groves holds an undergraduate degree in fine art from Oxford University.

Their sensory installations are an ongoing series of works that they describe as "Ephemeral Tech", in which the boundaries between digital technology and natural forces are dissolved to create unnatural phenomena. Ephemeral Tech looks to a future where technology uses the senses to transcend familiar interfaces based on the standard visual stimuli of flat screens, projections and LED arrays, becoming inseparable from both built and natural environments. They explore the concept of Ephemeral Tech in their installations such as New Spring (2017).

They are inspired by the filmmaking of Ray and Charles Eames and have said that they are designers of "mass communication rather than mass production".

The collective's work has been exhibited at the Victoria and Albert Museum in London and 21 21 Design Sight in Tokyo, and shown at both the Venice Art and Architecture Biennales. Examples of their work are held in the collections of the Museum of Modern Art (MoMA), Centre Pompidou, M+, Vitra Design Museum, and the Design Museum Gent.

In 2022, Murakami and Groves created A.A.Murakami. Their inaugural project under this name was titled Floating World.

The studio has relocated several times to conduct research and develop works informed by local geography, industry, and culture. Their practice combines immersive fieldwork with conceptual and material experimentation and has been characterised as applying methods similar to gonzo journalism within the field of design. Studio Swine views design as a means of grounding individuals in their physical environment through the integration of cultural history, craft traditions, and locally available resources, emphasising a sense of place over digital or cyber contexts.

== Selected works and projects ==
=== Sea Chair (2011) ===
First presented at the Royal College of Art show in 2011, "Sea Chair" is an open-source design that demonstrates how waste plastic picked up by fishing trawlers can be transformed into chairs on board the boats. Sea Chair won the BIO Gold Medal and the BIO Green Award for environmentally friendly projects at the 2023 Slovenia Design Biennale. It was also exhibited at the Beijing Art and Technology Biennale and shortlisted for Designs of the Year 2013, selected by the London Design Museum.

=== Can City (2013) ===
After graduation, Groves and Murakami moved to São Paulo and created "Can City", a mobile foundry that operates around the city's streets. It smelts aluminium cans using waste vegetable oil collected from local cafes as fuel. The moulds and the finished pieces are all made on location. In a city with some 20 million residents, waste is generated on a massive scale. However, over 80% of the recycling is collected by an informal system of independent waste collectors known as Catadores, who pull their handmade carts around the streets. The project has produced stools inspired by vernacular design and made for the food market that provided the waste materials. The project highlighted local resourcefulness and urban conditions.

"Can City" was commissioned by the Coletivo Amor de Madre Gallery, São Paulo, and was supported by Heineken. Pieces from the Can City project are in the collection of the Museum of Modern Art.

=== Hair Highway (2014) ===
Having developed a technique to infuse hair in natural resin as an alternative to wood while studying at the Royal College of Art, Studio Swine travelled to China to visit a hair market in Shandong and filmed parts of the hair trade, commenting on the use of human hair as a future resource in the context of China's past and present trade relationship with the world. As part of the project, they created a series of decorative pieces and accessories influenced by Art Deco architecture and design found in Shanghai. The pieces in the project were made from coloured resin and human hair.

"Hair Highway" was presented at Design Miami/Basel in 2014 and featured on National Geographic.

=== Metallic Geology (2014) ===
Metallic Geology encapsulates Studio Swine's investigation into metallic foam. A piece from Metallic Geology is a cabinet that has been acquired by M+. The cabinet is created by injecting gas into molten metal, resulting in a hardened structure with irregular internal voids. Known for being strong, lightweight, and costly to produce, aluminium foam is typically used in industrial applications such as automotive and aerospace manufacturing. Studio Swine studied the material in Hangzhou, a centre of aluminium foam production, and collaborated with local fabricators to mill a solid block into a rock-like form. The cabinet features a rough, stone-like exterior and contrasting mirror-polished interior shelves, highlighting the tension between natural appearance and industrial fabrication. The metallic foam material resembles volcanic rock and looks like pumice.

=== Gyrecraft (2015) ===
Gyrecraft is a design collection by the London-based Studio Swine, consisting of objects made from plastic debris collected from the world's five major ocean gyres. The project addresses the issue of ocean plastic pollution by repurposing reclaimed materials into artisanal objects inspired by maritime craft traditions.

Studio Swine founders Azusa Murakami and Alexander Groves conducted an expedition across the Atlantic Ocean, including the North Atlantic Gyre, to collect plastic waste. The gathered material was melted and transformed into five objects, each representing one of the ocean gyres. The designs incorporate cultural and historical references related to the island communities associated with these ocean regions.

=== Fordlandia (2016) ===
"Fordlandia" is an art installation inspired by a ghost town deep in the Amazon rainforest built by the American industrialist Henry Ford in the late 1920s to secure a supply of rubber for his automobile empire. Through the construction of a fictional domestic space made entirely of Amazonian rubber and other materials from the rainforest, the installation explores the idea of synthesis between nature and industry, questioning Henry Ford's attempt to tame nature for his industrial gain. For the project, Studio Swine visited Fordlandia and stayed with rubber tappers in the Western Amazon.

=== New Spring (2017) ===
"New Spring" is an art installation created by Studio Swine and supported by COS. The installation consists of a six-metre-high tree of aluminium that releases mist-filled bubbles that break upon human contact but can be held by visitors with special gloves. Visitors are invited to interact with the bubbles, triggering the release of scent and mist.

Shown at Milan Design Week in 2017, Studio Swine have said that the work is inspired by the ephemerality of cherry blossoms and re-examines how we can interact with technology through our senses. New Spring was also awarded Most Engaging Exhibition by Salone Del Mobile.

=== Infinity Blue (2018) ===
Infinity Blue is a permanent installation that celebrates cyanobacteria, one of the world's smallest living beings. They describe their work as "a monument to their vital creation, which continues to provide the oxygen in every breath we take".

The monument is surfaced with Cornish clay and oxide glazes that reflect local mining history. The textural pattern on the ceramic tiles is generated by a reaction-diffusion algorithm found in nature. From the sculpture, 32 vortex cannons fire scented smoke rings. Studio Swine collaborated with Paris perfume house Givaudan to develop fragrances inspired by the aromas of primordial worlds.

=== Bubble Booth (2019) ===
For the 15th edition of Design Miami, Studio Swine created an inflatable bubble-shaped booth commissioned by Instagram Design. It is constructed from 100% recyclable polyvinyl chloride (PVC) and designed to be lightweight and compactable for easy transportation and assembly. The booth was designed to celebrate design for a more inclusive, accessible and diverse world.

=== Humble Administrator's Chair (2021) ===
Humble Administrator's Chair and Table is a furniture set by Studio Swine (UK/Japan), made from American red oak and cherry. The design draws inspiration from traditional Chinese gardens and the Ming Chair archetype. Developed during the COVID-19 lockdown in Tokyo, the project reflects the designers' renewed interest in nature and working with timber in its natural state. The chair features a solid American cherry seat and back leg, with steam-bent American red oak used for the front legs, arms, and backrest. The arms were shaped using a complex double-axis steam bend, requiring a custom jig and a team of six craftspeople to fabricate. The accompanying table is constructed from American cherry, with end-grain detailing visible on the tabletop through its straight-leg profile. A recessed shelf for a laptop also functions as a tensioning brace.

=== Metropolis. I (2024) ===
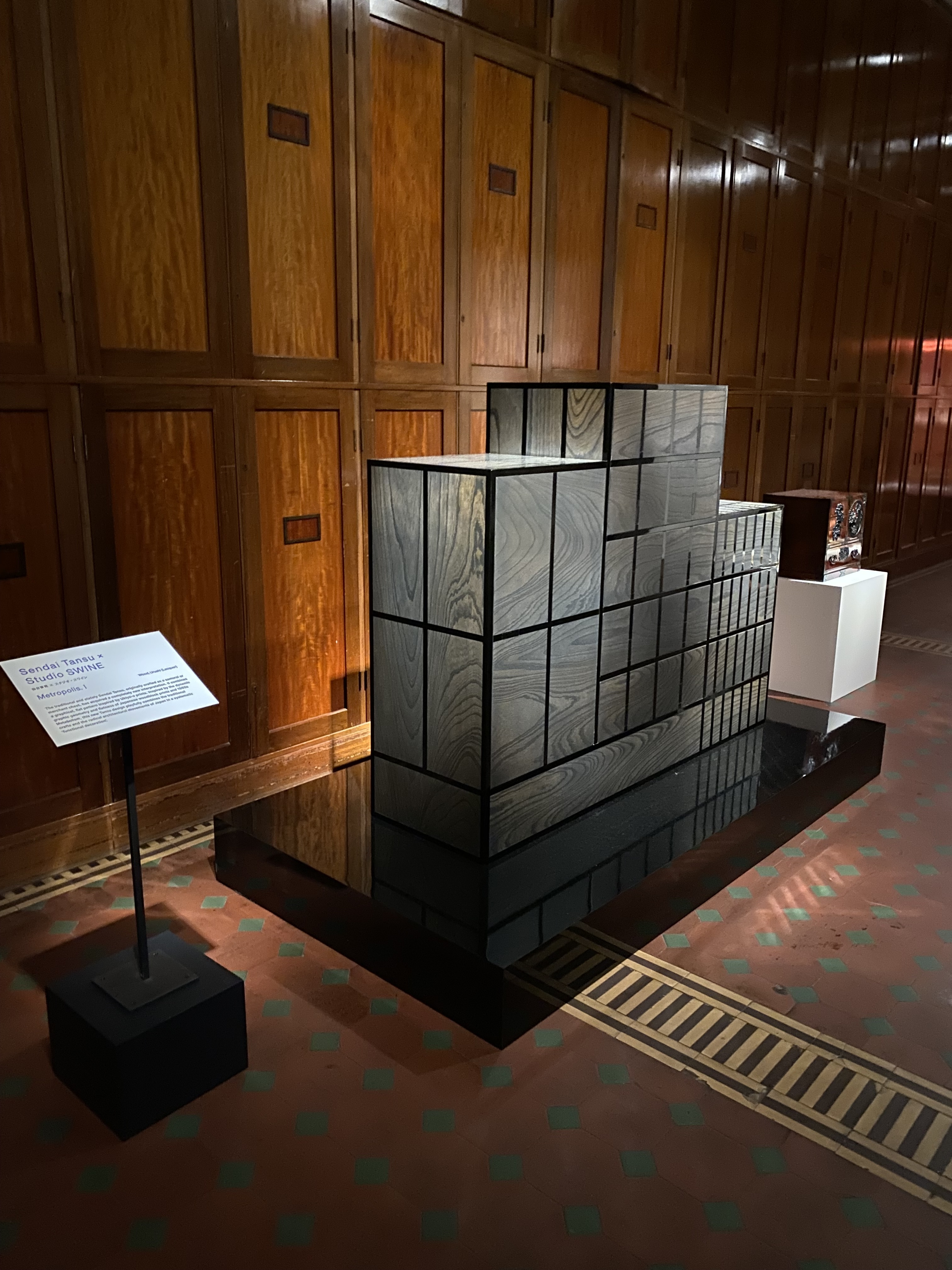
Metropolis. I was exhibited at the Victoria and Albert Museum (2024)

In 2024, Studio Swine collaborated with Sendai-Tansu cabinetmakers from Miyagi city to produce an installation presented at the Craft x Tech Tohoku Project exhibition at Kudan House in Tokyo. Their contribution to the initiative, titled Metropolis. I, is a geometric chest of drawers made of lacquer-coated wood and iron fittings that Azusa Murakami described as a type of "time travel device [...] employing age-old techniques and traditions that traverse the hands of artisans across centuries." The show was curated by Maria Cristina Didero and also included pieces by Ini Archibong, Sabine Marcelis, Yoichi Ochiai, Hideki Yoshimoto, and Michael Young. The work was subsequently exhibited at Design Miami in Basel and in the Prince Consort Gallery of the Victoria and Albert Museum during the London Design Festival.

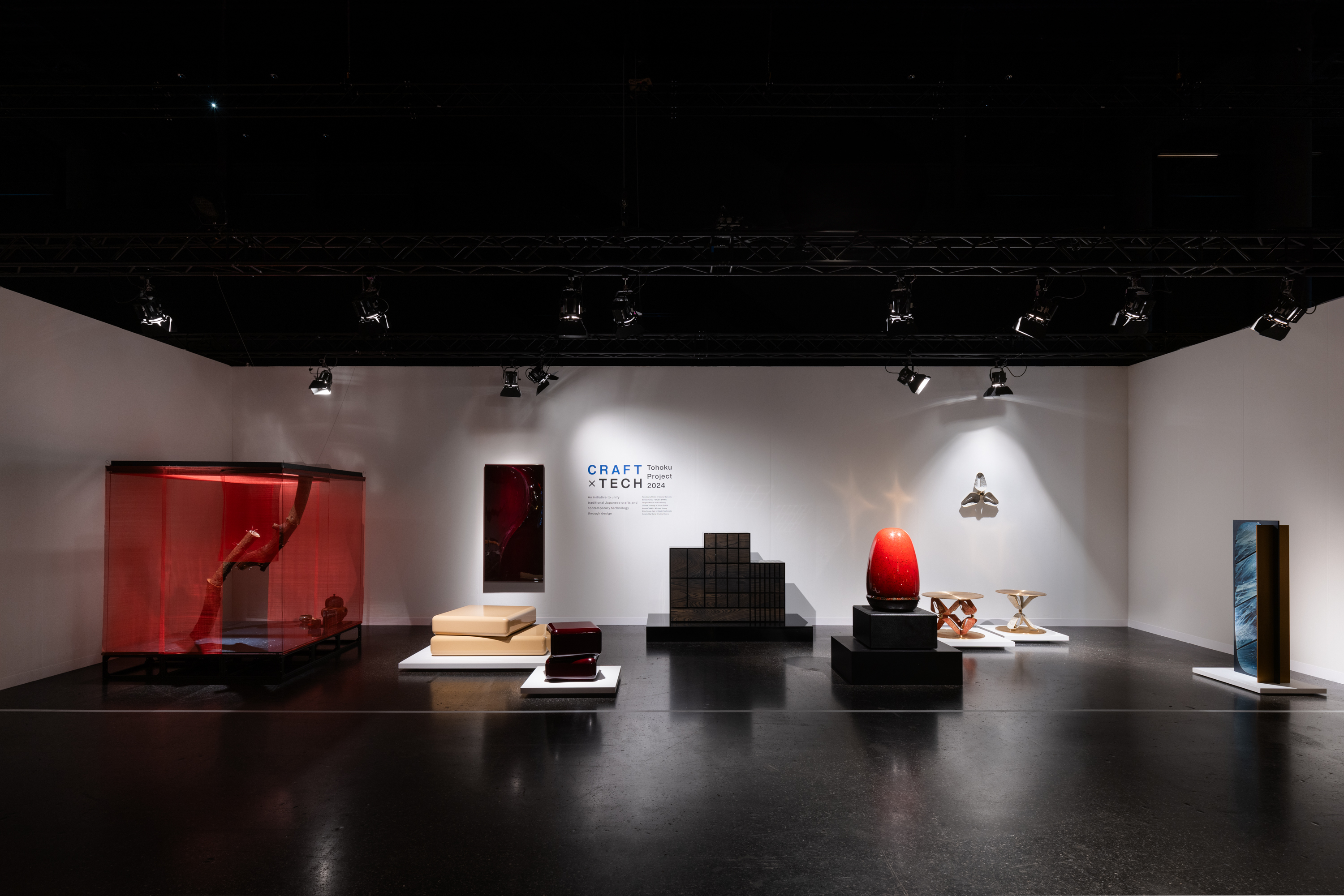
Craft x Tech Tohoku Project at Design Miami Art Basel (2024)

== Films ==
- Sea Chair (2011)
- Can City (2013)
- Buttons (2013)
- Hair Highway (2014)
- Terraforming (2016)
- Infinity Blue (2018)
- St James Market (2016)
- Floating World (2022)
- Under a Flowing Field (2023)
