= Sabine Marcelis =

Dutch artist and designer (born 1985)

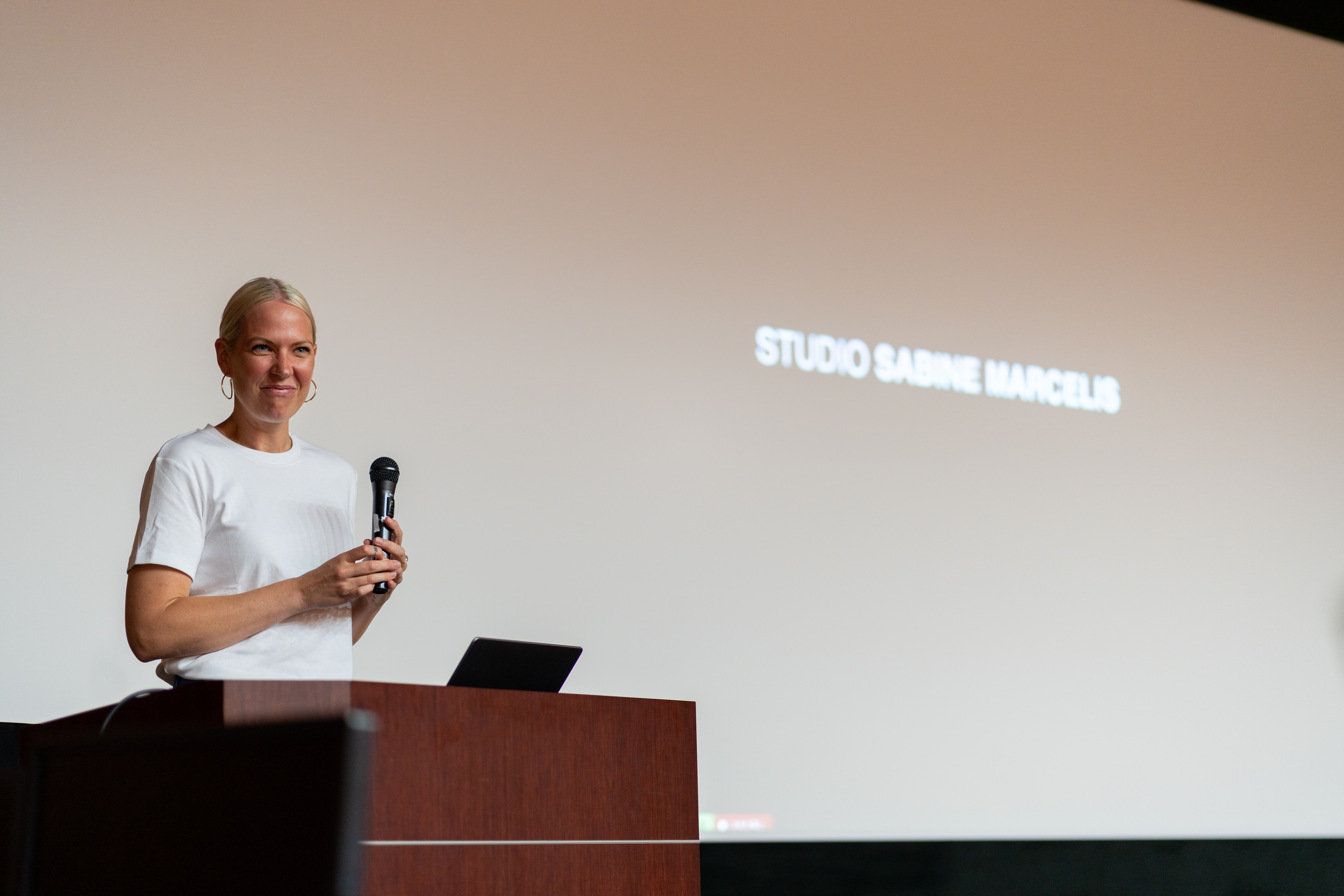
- Marcelis on stage at the University of Tokyo, August 2023
- Born: 1985 (age 40–41); Alkmaar, Netherlands
- Education: Victoria University of Wellington; Design Academy Eindhoven
- Occupations: Artist; Designer
- Organization: Studio Sabine Marcelis
- Partner: Paul Cournet
- Children: 2
- Website: sabinemarcelis.com

Sabine Marcelis (born 1985) is a Dutch artist and designer. Typically focused on themes of transparency, reflection, opacity and translucency, often using pastel colours, minimalist shapes, smooth surfaces, and materials such as resin, glass, and stone, she has described her work as "an investigation of light, how it can create effects and atmospheres."

== Early life and education ==
Marcelis was born in Alkmaar, Netherlands. She emigrated to Waihi, New Zealand, with her family at the age of 10. She studied industrial design at Victoria University of Wellington before returning to Holland in her early twenties to study at the Design Academy Eindhoven. Before pursuing a career in design, Marcelis competed in semi-professional snowboarding.

== Work and career ==
After graduating from the Design Academy Eindhoven in 2011, she founded Studio Sabine Marcelis in Rotterdam, where she lives and works. Her studio has worked with companies such as Apple, Audi, Bulgari, Cartier, Céline, IKEA, Fendi, LVMH, Isabel Marant, Stella McCartney, and Renault.

=== Design ===
Marcelis has designed furniture, lighting, packaging, and accessories for brands such as Acerbis Design, Arco, BD Barcelona, cc-tapis, Calico Wallpaper, Established & Sons, Iittala, La Prairie, Mathmos, Natuzzi, and the Swedish furniture brand Hem.

In 2022 she designed a collection of lamps and homewares for Ikea which included "a vase, champagne coupes ... glasses, glass drink stirrers and carafes, donut-shaped glass bowls ... paper napkins and low pile rugs ... glass shelves and trays as well as coffee tables that mimic the designer's popular Candy Cubes." In 2026 she revisited the "now-iconic lamp" from the original Varmblixt ('warm light') collection, reimagining it as a high-tech, dimmable, variable colour smart version of the "cult" light (the original design was also reintroduced and will remain in the company's catalogue).

In 2024, the Stedelijk museum in Amsterdam commissioned Marcelis to design a new piece. The result is an industrially manufactured brushed aluminium stacking chair called the Stedelijk Chair. A powder coated version of the piece in various colours was released in 2025.

=== Installations ===
In 2019, Marcelis was invited by the Mies van der Rohe Foundation to participate in its Interventions programme, a series of temporary installations in the Barcelona Pavilion which has featured artists and architects such as Ai Weiwei, Enric MIralles, and Ryue Nishizawa. Her contribution was a group of pieces titled "No Fear of Glass", a play on Josep Quetglas Riusech's 2001 book about the building "Fear of Glass".

She produced a temporary installation titled "Swivel" in St Giles Square in London for the 2022 London Design Festival.

In 2022, the Vitra Design Museum staged "Colour Rush! An Installation by Sabine Marcelis" in which she reorganised the approximately 400 pieces held in the Schaudepot exhibition warehouse collection by colour.

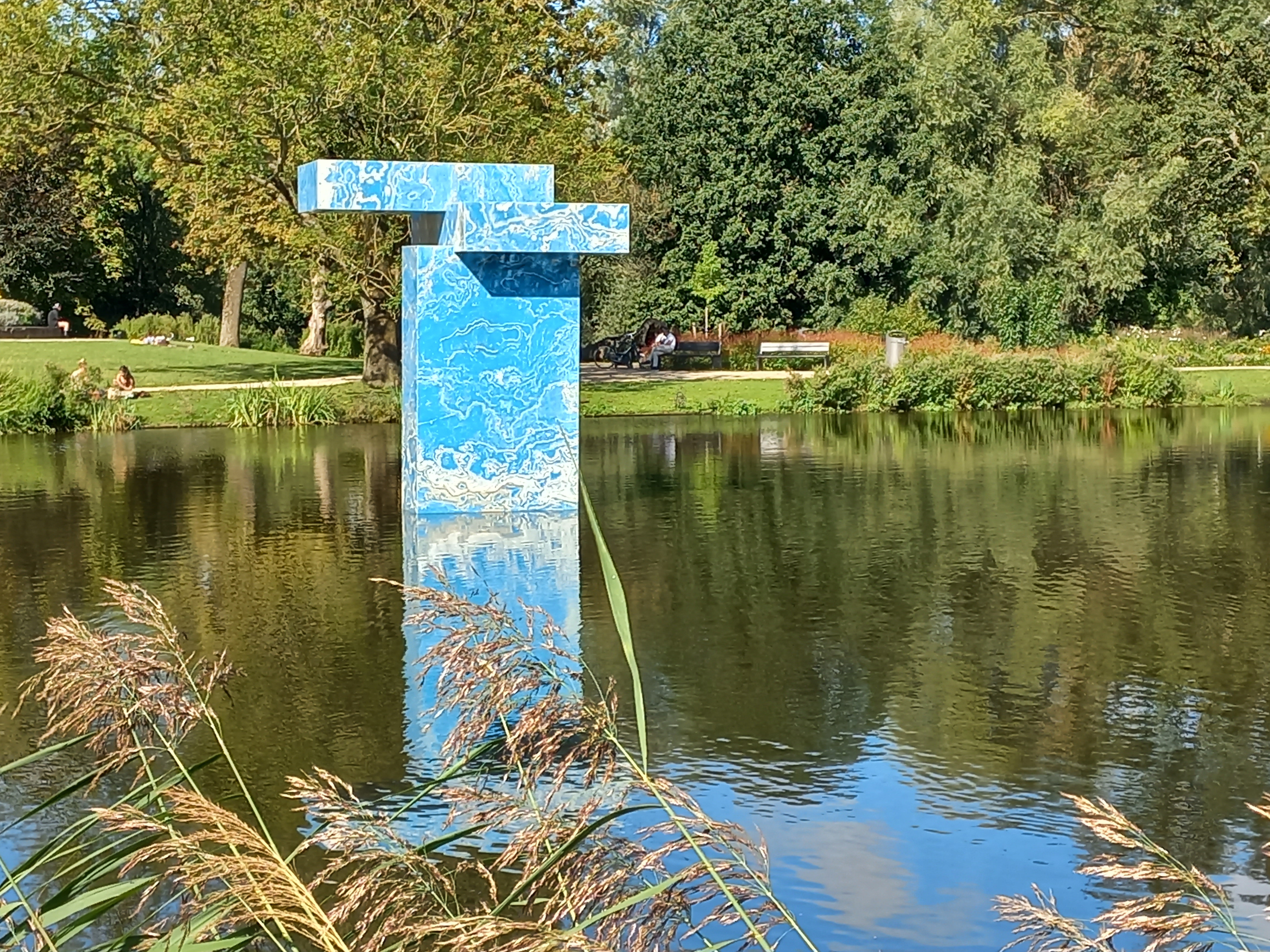
Stacked water fountain for Solid Nature, Vondelpark, Amsterdam (2024)

In 2024, the High Museum of Art added Marcelis's Panorama to a decade-long series of monumental outdoor art installations. The kinetic work, a composition of four large, rotating red and orange mirrored glass columns, "traverses the boundary between art and design". According to the museum, it is "the designer's first monumental and kinetic work". Other artists who have contributed to the series, which is staged on the Woodruff Arts Center's Carroll Slater Sifly Piazza, include Tanya Aguiñiga, Ignacio Cadena, Héctor Esrawe, Jaime Hayon, Bryony Roberts, and Yuri Suzuki. Also in 2024, she designed Stacked, an abstract sculptural water fountain for Amsterdam's Vondelpark.

Her 2025 installation for Apple, which combines both an exhibition in the Apple Park Observatory galley that includes "prismatic polyester resin, frosted coloured glass, and clear acrylic" colour studies, as well as the addition of a mirrored obelisk like public sculpture in Apple Park, was called "Apple's most Instagrammable new launch" by Wallpaper* magazine.

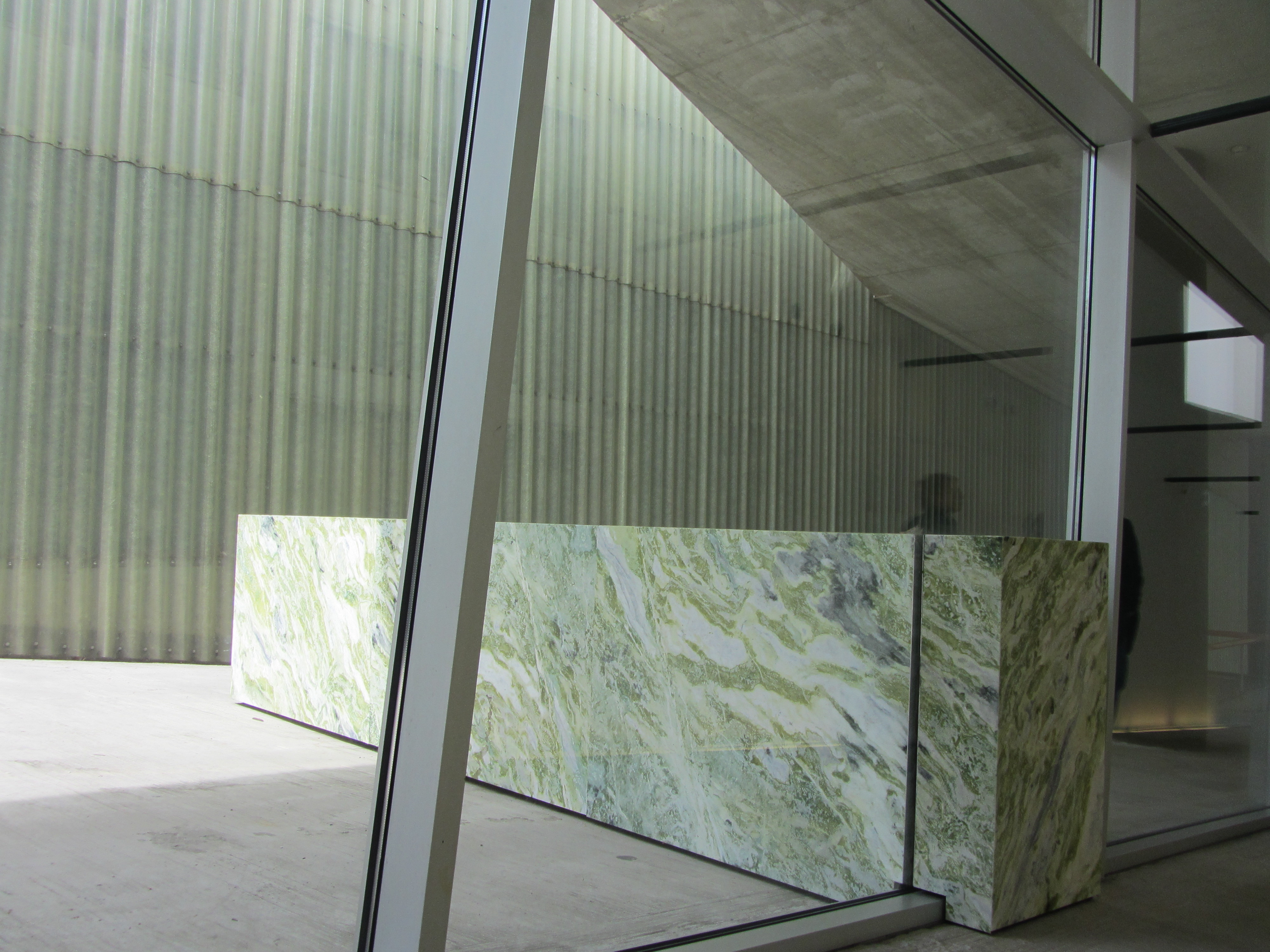
Continuum, Kunsthal, Rotterdam (2026)

In 2026 the Kunsthal Rotterdam added Marcelis's intervention to its Rem Koolhaas / OMA designed building, a work titled Continuum, which is part of the museum's Kunsthal Inside/Out programme. The initiative "invites designers to create a site-specific work that can be experienced both inside and outside of the building."

=== Exhibitions and collections ===
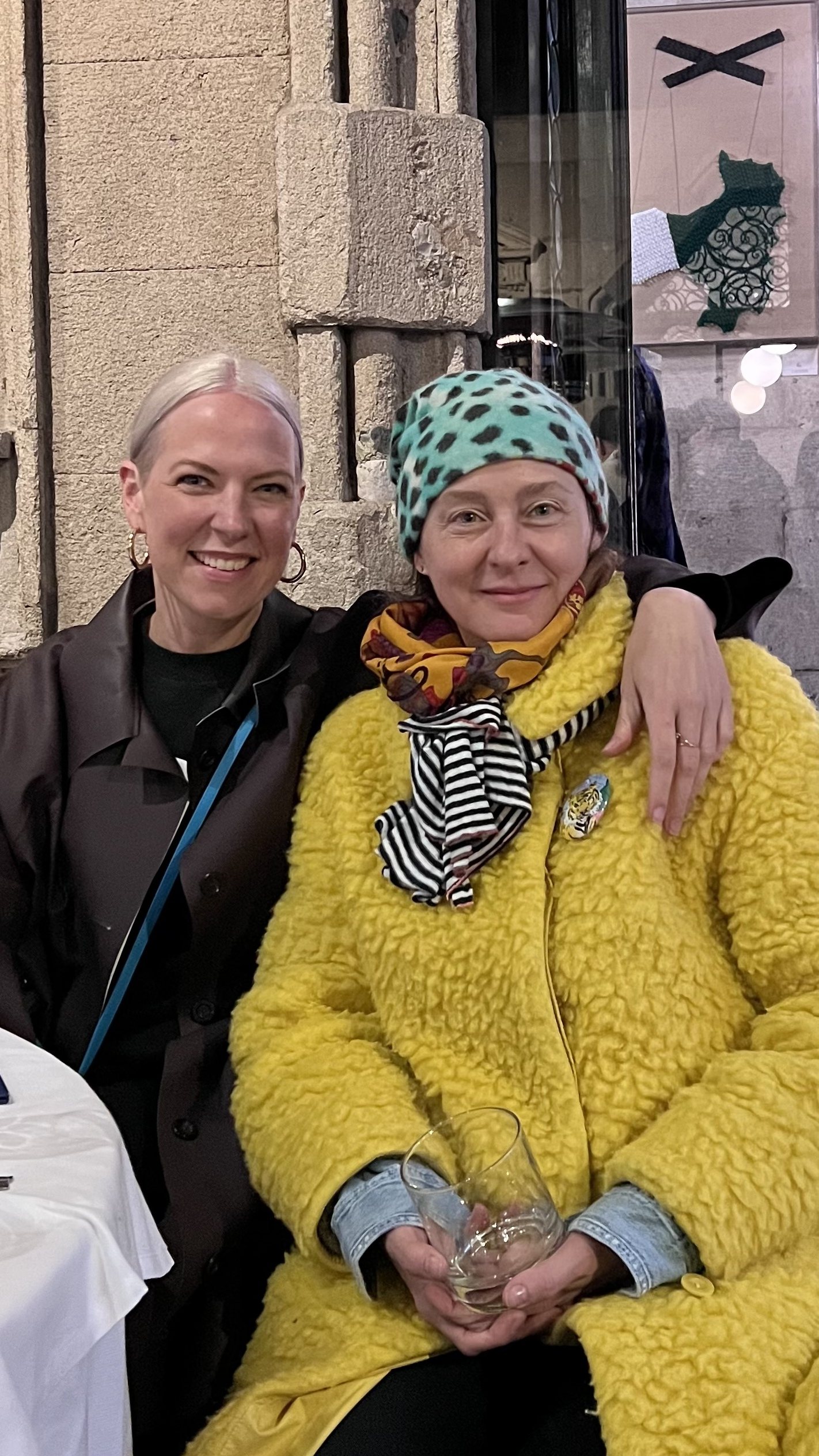
Marcelis and the Milanese curator Maria Cristina Didero at a Milan Design Week reception in the palazzo Bagatti Valsecchi (2023)

Collections holding examples of Marcelis's work include the Stedelijk museum in Amsterdam, Design Museum Gent, Centraal Museum in Utrecht, the Museum Boijmans Van Beuningen, Rabobank Kunstcollectie, and the Collection Vedute at the Nieuwe Instituut in Rotterdam (in the Netherlands); Van Haerents Collection in Brussels, the Vitra Design Museum in Germany; the National Gallery of Victoria (NGV) and the Art Gallery of South Australia (AGSA); the High Museum of Art in Atlanta, and the Museum of Modern Art in New York.

Her work has been exhibited at galleries such as Etage Projects in Copenhagen, Gallery Collectional in Dubai, Side Gallery in Barcelona, Carwan Gallery in Greece, Gallery Sally Dan-Cuthbert in Australia, and Design Miami. In 2023, she designed a unique "art version" of the Renault Twingo which was shown at the Pompidou Centre in Paris.

Eight sculptures by Marcelis created for the 2023 Mille Miglia, for which she also designed the prize winners' trophies, were donated to the city of Brescia and exhibited the Cloister of the University of Brescia.

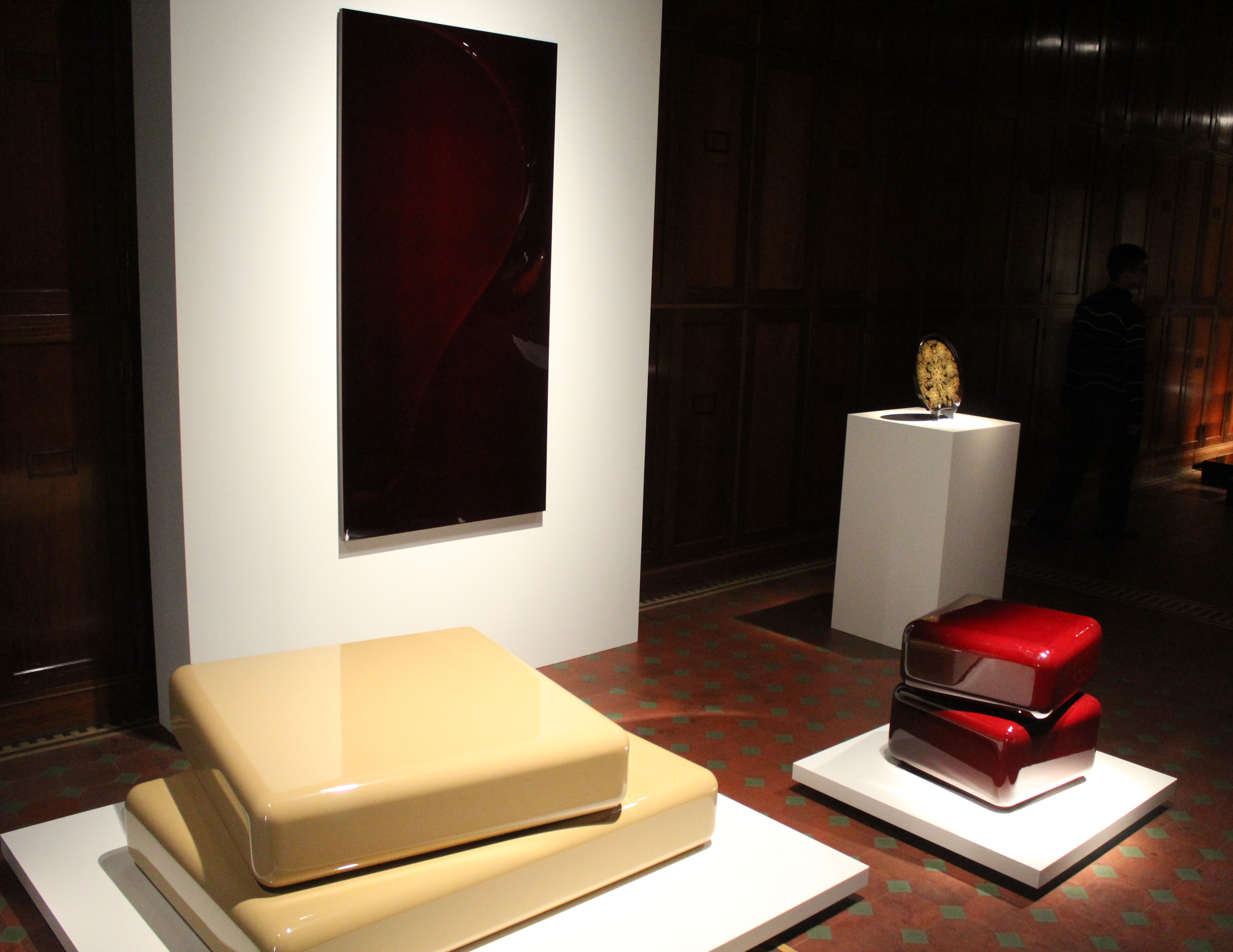
Yōkan designed for Kawatsura Shikki, Prince Consort Gallery, Victoria and Albert Museum (2024)

In 2024, her collaboration with traditional Japanese lacquerware artisans Kawatsura Shikki was included in a Tokyo exhibition at Kudan House called Craft x Tech Tohoku Project. The work, a series titled Yōkan, includes three pieces – two tables and a wall mounted abstract piece, all made using traditional Urushi lacquer on hand-crafted wood. The show was curated by Maria Cristina Didero and included works by Studio Swine, Ini Archibong, Yoichi Ochiai, Hideki Yoshimoto, and Michael Young. Yōkan was subsequently exhibited at, Design Miami, the Victoria and Albert museum during the London Design Festival, and in the Netherlands Pavilion at Expo 2025 in Osaka.

In 2025, the Museum of Modern Art added her Candy Cube to its collection and included the piece in Pirouette: Turning Points in Design, an exhibition featuring "widely recognized design icons [...] highlighting pivotal moments in design history."

She has frequently exhibited work at the Salone del Mobile ('Milan Furniture Fair') since the start of her career, and in 2026 created a large kinetic piece titled Plume for the inaugural Salone Raritas, a new collectible design annex to the main fair. Speaking with la Repubblica at the time of the exhibition, she made a declaration of love to the city, and penned a "Love Letter to Milano".

In October 2026, the Museum für Gestaltung Zürich opened a major retrospective titled Sabine Marcelis—Light and Color, which casts an eye over a decade of the designer's work, although the museum has "purposefully set aside the retrospective format in favour of larger installations, celebrating Marcelis’ approach." The show is organised as series of installations which have been called "rooms out of light" by one reviewer. Works presented range from her early Candy Cubes and Tall Stripe mirror, to pieces from her Barcelona Pavilion exhibition, through various collaborations with brands like Ikea and Mathmos. The show's curator Damian Fopp compares the effect of these installations, notably the lava lamp room, to the Infinity Mirror Rooms of the late Japanese artist Yayoi Kusama. Reflecting on the scale of the exhibition, Marcelis notes "This is the first time a museum has brought so much of my work together in one place ... I’m always so preoccupied with what’s next that I don’t like to look back so much, but it’s amazing to have this moment to actually stop and look back for a minute.” She went on to confide that "It feels pretty special." The designer, who often speaks of her debt to others, also goes to pains to credit her team, saying that, "Many hands and brains are involved in bringing projects to life – it’s not just me, it’s a whole ecosystem."

=== Teaching ===
She is a mentor for both the Women Bauhaus Collective and the Lexus Design Award, and also teaches at the École cantonale d'art de Lausanne (ECAL).

== Personal life ==
Her partner is the architect Paul Cournet. They have a son who was born during the Covid pandemic. Marcelis observed that her piece called "Boa", a torus shaped pouf, is "helping him learn how to walk. And it's also a perfect spot to safely place him if I have to quickly leave the room." They also have a daughter, who was born in 2024.

== Inspiration ==
At the age of 16, Marcelis was an avid snowboarder. In an interview with Surface magazine, she states that her use of snowboarding goggles made her realize the powerful effect colour has on one's environment. This helped her develop her work titled "Colour Rush" which was released in May 2022 at the Vitra Design Museum.

Specifically, Marcelis also stated that her inspiration stems from the architect Hans Hollein for his works with not only architecture but also his work with jewelry.

== Awards ==
- 2019 GQ Men of the Year Awards "International Artist of the Year"
- 2019 Elle Deco International Design Award "Young Designer of the Year"
- 2019 Designboom Design Prize "Best Design Newcomer"
- 2020 Wallpaper* "Designer of the Year"
- 2022 Architectural Digest "AD100"
- 2023 Elle Deco International Design Award "Designer of the Year"
- 2023 Monocle Magazine "Designer of the year"
- 2024 Dezeen Awards, "Designer of the year"

== Publications ==
- Marcelis, Sabine; Puigjaner, Anna (2021). Pestellini Laparelli, Ippolito (ed.). No Fear of Glass. Barcelons: Fundació Mies van der Rohe. ISBN 978-84-123670-9-6.
