= Arch for Arch =

The Arch for Arch is an architectural structure and monument located in Cape Town, South Africa, created to commemorate the life and work of Desmond Tutu. Commissioned by Design Indaba and sponsored by Liberty, its name is a play on Tutu's widely used nickname, "The Arch". A smaller version of the monument is located in Johannesburg, South Africa at Constitution Hill.

== Background ==
In 2016, Design Indaba CEO, Ravi Naidoo, was approached by Cape Town mayor, Patricia De Lille, with the task of creatively honoring the former Archbishop Desmond Tutu. Through discussions with sponsor, Liberty, and input from Norwegian architecture firm Snøhetta and Johannesburg-based urban design firm, Local Studio, the Arch for Arch was conceptualized. The wooden monument was envisioned as a public celebration of Tutu's legacy and impact on the people of South Africa.

== Architecture and location ==
The Arch is a tribute to the values of the South African Constitution along with it being a tribute to Tutu and the 14 arches that form the arch also serve to highlight the 14 chapters of the South African Constitution. The structure stands at 9 meters tall. Designed by Snøhetta co-founder, Craig Dykers, with support from Local Studio's Thomas Chapman, the physical structure of the Arch for Arch consists of 14 individual arched beams of wood, which together form a dome. Swissline Design Timber Engineers, The Structural Workshop (Pty) Ltd and Smart Civils were involved in its construction.

Arch for Arch was installed beside historic St. George's Cathedral on Cape Town's Adderley street. It is situated on the oldest pedestrian thoroughfare in the country - Government Avenue. The Houses of Parliament, the Slave Lodge, and the Company's Garden are all within walking distance.

== Unveiling ==
At the 2017 Design Indaba Conference, a prototype of the structure was first unveiled to the public during the event's finale. Archbishop Tutu, Craig Dykers, and Thomas Chapman were all present for the occasion. The Arch for Arch had its official unveiling on October 7, 2017, which was on Tutu's 86th birthday. A private service was held at the St. George's Cathedral in Cape Town in his honor, attended by notable people, including Albie Sachs, Cheryl Carolus, and Mamphele Ramphela, as well as the greater Tutu family. A smaller version of the Arch For Arch monument was unveiled at Constitution Hill in Johannesburg on December 20, 2017, to celebrate the 22nd anniversary of South Africa's Constitution.
