= Miya Shoji =

- Company type: Private
- Industry: Japanese furniture
- Founded: 1951; 74 years ago in New York City, United States
- Owner: Hisao Hanafusa
- Number of employees: 7
- Website: http://www.miyashoji.com/

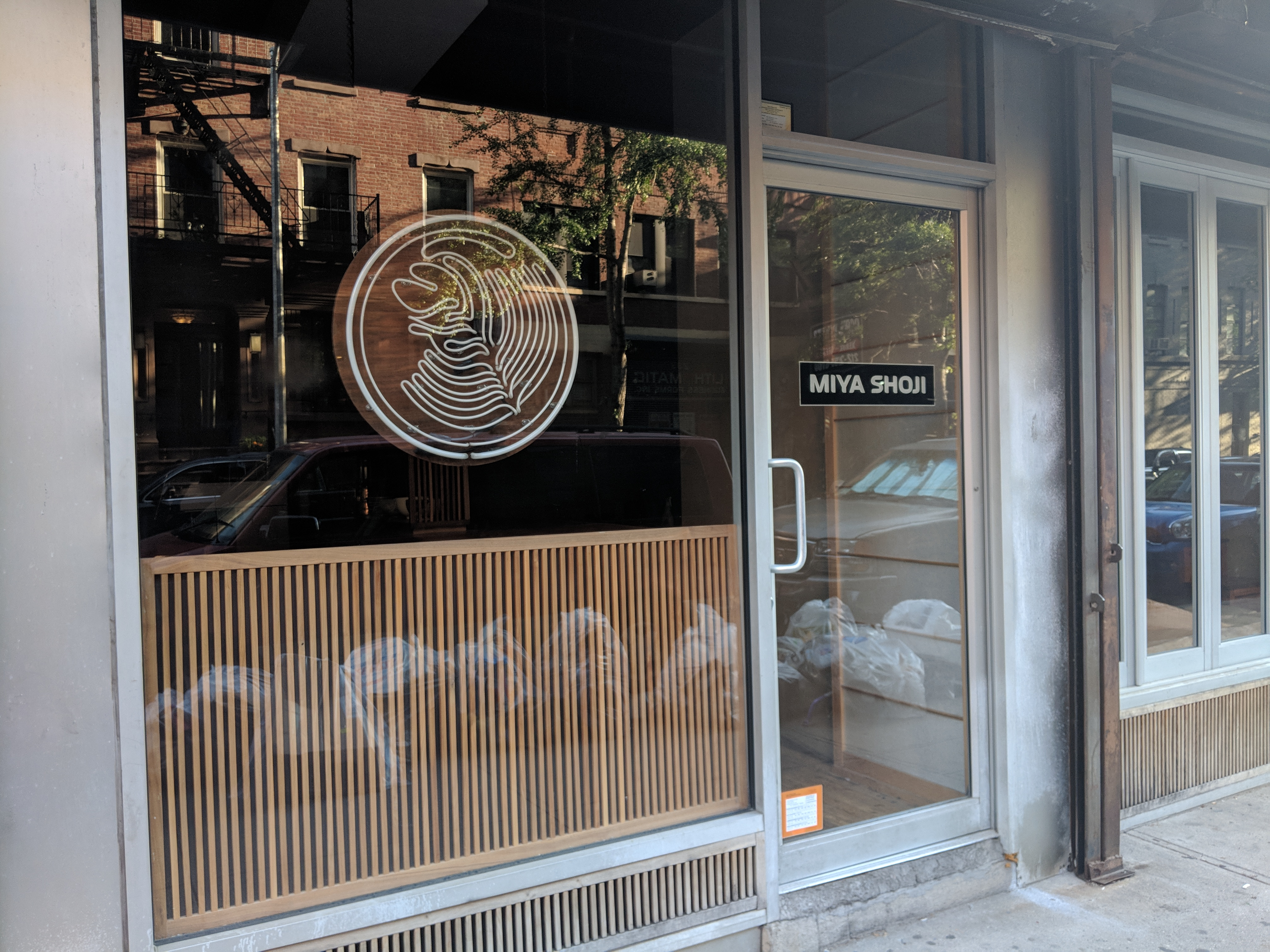
Miya Shoji Storefront

Miya Shoji is a manufacturer and retailer of shōji, futons, and other Japanese furniture based in New York City. It was founded in 1951 to make shōji. Hisao Hanafusa, the shop's current owner, started working there after he immigrated to the US in 1963 and purchased the shop in 1970. It is now owned by him as well as his son Zui. It is notable for making double-sided shōji, which use a second wooden frame to make them sturdier. Many of its designs are original, with Hanafusa describing them as "nothing like what you would see in Japan." However the carpenters still use traditional tools and methods to make the pieces.

While the shop specializes in shōji, it also manufactures futons, tables, tansu, and mizuya. The wood used is from both Japan and the US.

Miya Shoji's work has been featured in the Museum of Fine Arts, Boston.

It is the only Japanese carpentry shop in NYC.
