= Ravi Naidoo =

South African businessman (born 1964)

- Naidoo in 2011
- Born: 12 August 1964 (age 62); Durban, South Africa
- Education: University of Cape Town (MBA, B.Sc)
- Occupations: Business Executive; CEO
- Years active: 1994–present
- Notable work: Design Indaba
- Children: 2

Ravi Naidoo (born 12 August 1964) is a South African entrepreneur, curator, and the founder of Interactive Africa and Design Indaba. He co-founded Rain, Africa’s first 5G/data-only network, and played key roles in major campaigns including the African Connection Rally (1999), the First African in Space communications project (2002), and South Africa’s successful 2010 FIFA World Cup bid. Naidoo is recognized internationally as a leader in design and creativity, having served on global juries such as the Index Award (Copenhagen), Dutch Design Awards, D&AD Impact Awards, and IXDA Awards (Chair, 2017). He is the first African recipient of the Sir Misha Black Medal for Design Education (2015) and won The Design Prize (Golden Madonnina) in Milan (2017).

== Career ==
From 1990 to 1993, Naidoo worked as an account director at Young & Rubicam.

In 1994, he founded Interactive Africa, a Cape Town–based media and project-management company. The firm gained early prominence with large-scale projects including:

- African Connection Rally (1999): a roadshow from the northern to southern tip of Africa, designed to promote investment in telecommunications infrastructure.
- First African in Space (2002): the communications campaign around Mark Shuttleworth’s space mission, incorporating education, outreach, and international media.
- FIFA World Cup bids (2006, 2010): strategic and marketing work that contributed to South Africa’s successful hosting of the 2010 FIFA World Cup.

Naidoo also contributed to the Melbourne 2006 Commonwealth Games bid and co-founded the Cape IT Initiative (CITI) to support the Western Cape technology sector.

== Design Indaba ==
In 1995, Naidoo founded Design Indaba, which has grown into one of the world’s leading design platforms, known for its flagship annual conference, digital publication, and a “Do Tank” ethos focused on civic innovation.

Selected Do Tank projects include:

- 10x10 Housing Project: collaboration with international architects such as David Adjaye, Tom Dixon, and Shigeru Ban to develop affordable housing prototypes in South Africa. The project has been featured in publications including Dezeen, Creative Review, and Vitamin Green (Phaidon).
- Arch for Arch (2017): a monument in Cape Town honouring Archbishop Desmond Tutu and the South African Constitution, created with Snøhetta and Local Studio.

Naidoo has also curated international initiatives including Design Commons (Helsinki) and Antenna (Netherlands), a global showcase for emerging design graduates.

== RAIN ==
Naidoo is a co-founder of Rain, Africa’s first data-only mobile operator and 5G network. He spearheaded the company’s brand identity and strategic positioning.

== Juries, boards, and speaking ==
Naidoo has served on multiple international juries, including:

- Index Award (Copenhagen)
- Dutch Design Awards
- D&AD Impact Awards
- IXDA Awards, serving as Chair in 2017

He has also spoken at international forums such as WIPO (Geneva), the Aspen Ideas Festival, and the United Nations SDG Lounge.

== Awards and recognition ==
- Sir Misha Black Medal for Design Education (2015, London) — first African recipient.
- The Design Prize (Golden Madonnina) (2017, Milan) — awarded in the Communications category.
- Other honours include recognition by the Business and Arts South Africa (BASA) Awards and international media citations ranking Design Indaba among the world’s leading design conferences.

== See also ==
- Design Indaba
- Interactive Africa
- Rain (telecommunications company)
- Recipients of the Sir Misha Black Medal
