= Hideki Yoshimoto =

Japanese artist, design engineer, and academic

Dr Hideki Yoshimoto
- 吉本英樹
- Yoshimoto in 2026
- Born: 1985 (age 40–41); Wakayama Prefecture
- Education: University of Tokyo (M.S.); Royal College of Art (Ph.D)
- Occupations: Artist, designer, and engineer
- Employer(s): Research Center for Advanced Science and Technology (University of Tokyo)
- Known for: Craft x Tech initiative; Inaho light sculptures
- Website: tngnt.uk

Hideki Yoshimoto (吉本英樹; born 1985) is a Japanese artist, design engineer, and academic. His work focuses on bridging the gap between traditional craft, modern technology, and contemporary design practice, with the belief that "design becomes a common language that everyone can speak". His stated goal is the "preservation and evolution of Japanese culture" through novel applications of engineering technologies and the promotion of international creative collaborations.

== Early life and education ==
Yoshimoto was born in Wakayama Prefecture in 1985. He attended and graduated from the University of Tokyo with a master's degree in aeronautical engineering and astronautics. He subsequently earned a doctorate in innovation design engineering from the Royal College of Art in London (RCA) in 2016.

== Career ==
Yoshimoto is a researcher and associate professor at the Research Center for Advanced Science and Technology (RCAST) at the University of Tokyo. He is also the director of the creative consultancy Tangent Design and Invention—which Yoshimoto founded in 2015 while still a student at the RCA, as well as the founder and creative director of the Craft x Tech initiative, which he launched in 2020. He has studios in both London and Tokyo.

His design studio has consulted for brands, companies, and organisations such as Asahi Intecc, Globe-Trotter, Hermès, JAXA, Lexus, MB&F, Seiko, Sumitomo, Takasho Digitec, Toppan, Toyota, Wonderglass, and the Wakayama Prefecture. The studio's work spans from technological and engineering consultancy, product and design development, to lighting and exhibition design—as well as managing various international collaborations, cultural projects and initiatives, and supporting Yoshimoto’s own artistic practice.

Some of Yoshimoto’s earliest published work involves AI guided balloons and drones. His 2010 piece titled BeatFly is an open source remote controlled blimp piloted using voice commands or MIDI musical recordings and an ordinary keyboard via a web interface, purpose-built software, and even an early iPhone app. Another piece called Fluff (2009–2015) further explores the theme of hybridisation between art, design, engineering, and technology to create airborne lighting sculptures.

Fluff Light Sculptures (in flight)

He has "drawn inspiration from the silent dialogue between Japanese tradition and modernity, embodied in the collaboration between Isamu Noguchi and the lantern manufacturer Ozeki.” An encounter with Kawatsura Shikki lacquerware artisans while developing a project for Lexus led Yoshimoto to further emulate Noguchi's approach in applying Kogei (traditional Japanese crafts) in new and novel contexts. The experience changed his understanding of how "artistic and alive" Mingei (folk crafts) can be, and that something as simple as a miso soup bowl could be seen as a sculpture. As the founder of the Craft x Tech initiative, Yoshimoto is now well known for his work in the promotion of traditional Japanese craftsmanship through the integration of modern techniques and technology, and collaborative international workshops. According to Domus the initiative "reinforces [his] conviction that traditional techniques are not static, but a living body of knowledge capable of continuously responding to the present — and perhaps even shaping the future of design."

== Awards and recognition ==
Yoshimoto was a recipient of the 2013 Lexus Design Prize, the inaugural edition of the award. The piece for which he was recognised, a collaboration with Yoshinaka Ono, is an interactive kinetic light sculpture called Inaho ('ear of rice'), made with small LED light sources housed in perforated golden tubes mounted on narrow carbon fibre stems that react to the viewers presence through built-in proximity detection sensors, causing the individual stems to sway like rice stalks in the breeze. Lexus and its parent company Toyota have continued to support Yoshimoto's work and initiatives promoting Japanese craft and technology globally.

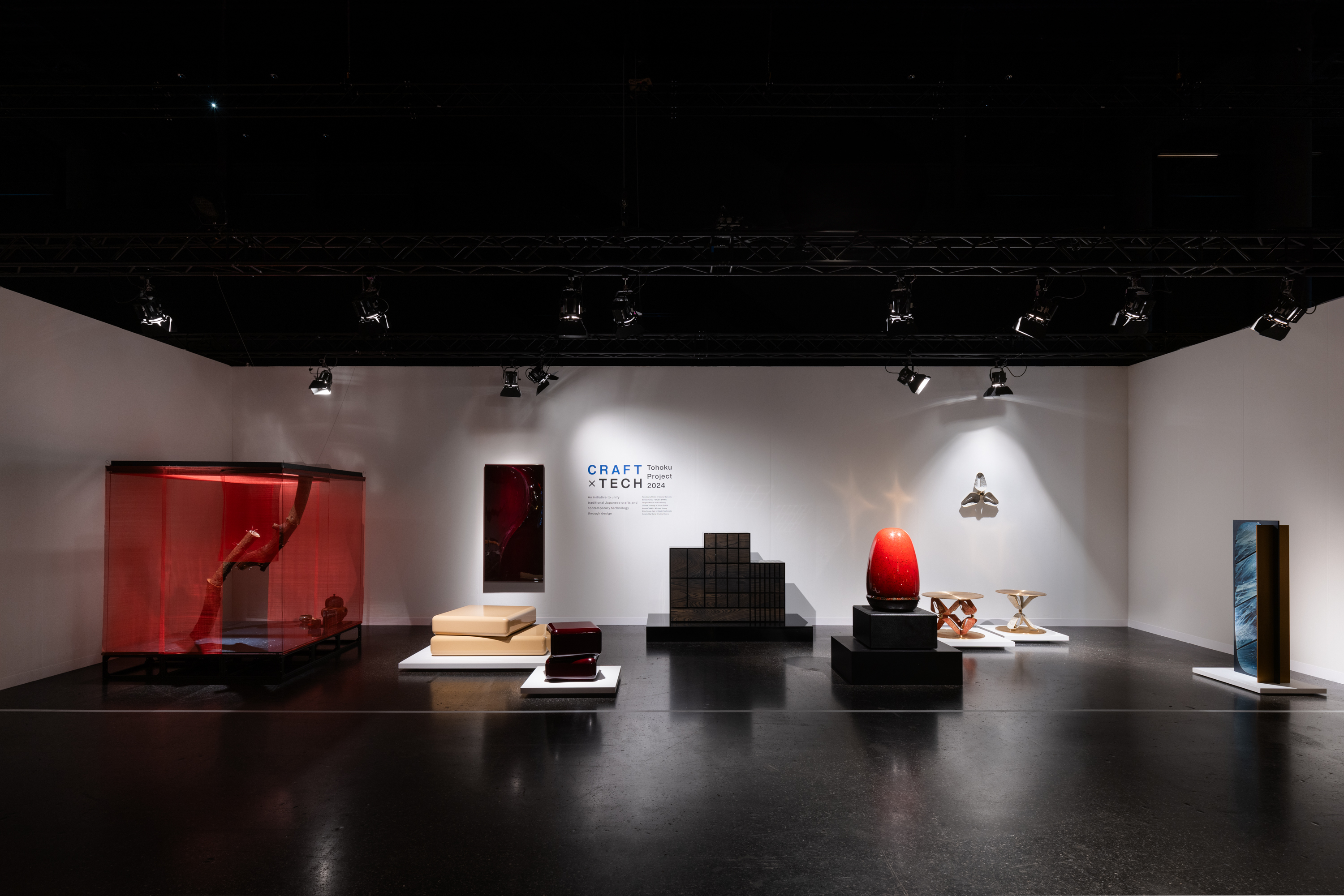
Craft x Tech Tohoku Project at Design Miami Art Basel (2024)

He has also been recognised in both the design and engineering sectors with awards from the Japanese Society for Artificial Intelligence (JSAI), Red Dot, Wakayama Prefecture, and IPA Super Creator certification. In 2024, after its debut in Tokyo, the first international exhibition of Yoshimoto's Craft x Tech initiative was named Best Curio Presentation at Design Miami in Basel, Switzerland.

In addition to his research and teaching at the University of Tokyo, Yoshimoto also lectures and participates in academic panels at other institutions, both at home and abroad.

Works by Yoshimoto have been exhibited in museums, cultural institutions, and galleries in Japan and overseas, as well as events like Art Basel, Design Miami, the Salone del Mobile in Milan, Maison&Object in Paris, and the London Design Festival. He also designed the Wakayama exhibition in the Kansai Pavilion at Expo2025 in Osaka. In 2026, Yoshimoto's work was included in the mission∞infinity space + quantum + art exhibition at the Museum of Contemporary Art Tokyo.

== Gallery of work ==
Detail of propulsion and control unit, Beatfly illuminating blimp by Yoshimoto (2010)

Inaho light sculpture by Yoshimoto and Yoshinaka Ono (Tangent Design and Invention, 2012)

Rain by Aizu Hongo Yaki and Yoshimoto, (Craft x Tech, 2024)
