= Maria Cristina Didero =

Italian curator, historian, and author

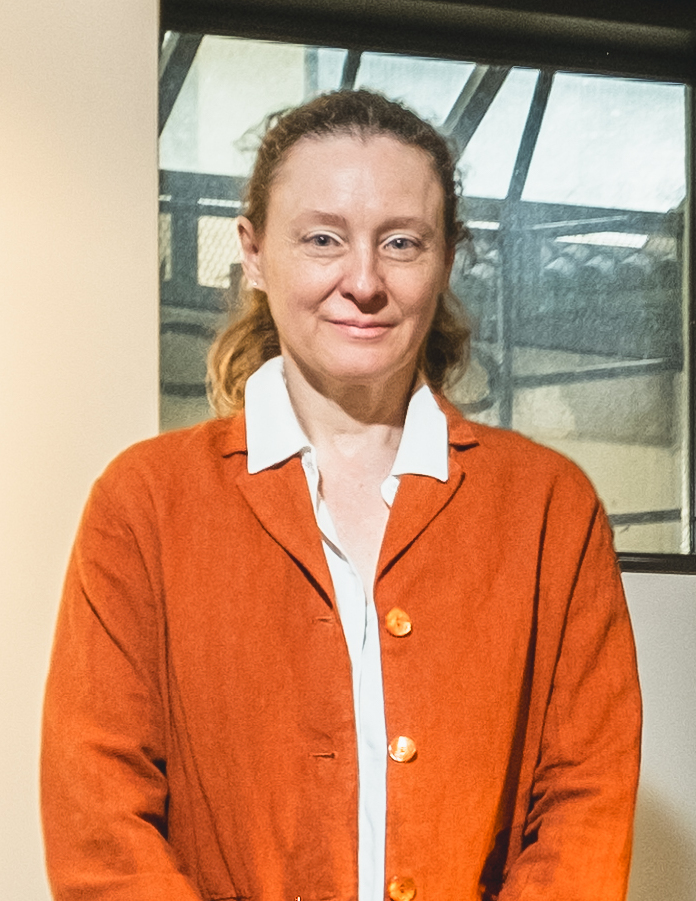
- Didero pictured at Kudan House in Tokyo (2024)
- Born: Rimini
- Education: University of Bologna
- Occupations: Curator, filmmaker, podcaster, writer
- Notable work: People of Maria Cristina Didero, Superdesign: Italian radical design 1965-75, Superdesign: Italian radical design 1965-75, We the others

Maria Cristina Didero is an Italian curator, historian, author, and design scholar. She was the first Italian curatorial director of Design Miami. Didero is quoted as saying that, "design is all about people, not about chairs." Architectural Digest called her "Milan’s Coolest Curator".

== Early life and education ==
Didero grew up in Rimini. She attended and graduated from the University of Bologna, from which she received a degree in literature and philosophy. She lives and works in Milan, where she moved in 1997. She is an expert in Italian design with a focus on the Radical period.

== Work and career ==
Didero worked with Alexander von Vegesack at the Vitra Design Museum for 16 years, after which she became the executive director of the Fondazione Bisazza. She has worked as a design consultant with companies and organisations such as DesignSingapore Council, Vitra, Fritz Hansen, Lexus, Fendi, Louis Vuitton, and Valextra. She has also served on design panels, mentorship programmes, and juries for awards such as Experimenta Design, Design Anthology, the Dezeen awards, and the Compasso d'Oro.

=== Curation ===
Her curatorial work has involved close collaboration with contemporary artists, architects, and designers such as Daniel Arsham, Stefano Boeri, the Campana brothers, Philippe Malouin, Sabine Marcelis, Yoichi Ochiai, Oki Sato, Atang Tshikare, and Bethan Laura Wood. She has curated exhibitions including Nendo: The Space in Between and The Conversation Show at the Design Museum Holon, Israel; Al(l) Projects with Aluminum (with Michael Young) at the Centre d'Innovation et de Design at Grand-Hornu in Belgium, and FUN HOUSE by Snarkitecture at the National Building Museum in Washington, D.C.; Take a Seat at the Galleria D’Arte Moderna in Turin; as well as exhibitions at the Museum für Kunst und Gewerbe Hamburg, and an exhibition called Friends + Design co-curated with Tulga Beyerle at the Museum of Applied Arts in Dresden She has also been a guest curator and expert consultant for exhibitions staged by commercial galleries such as SuperDesign at the R & Company gallery in New York.

In 2022 Didero was appointed curatorial director for Design Miami (a role in which she was preceded by Aric Chen and followed by curators such as Wava Carpenter, Hyeyoung Cho, Anna Carnick, and Glenn Adamson). She and fellow curator Annalisa Rosso created a digital virtual exposition platform called Perfettooo which is a venue for designers "to conceive a dream project to be realised in a mutable ideal space, shaped around their needs and therefore perfectly tailored for their collections."

She co-curated (with Richard Hutten) an exhibition for Milan Design Week 2023 called Droog30: Design or Non-design at the Triennale di Milano. Also in 2023, she and Tony Chambers collaborated with the DesignSingapore Council for the exhibition Future Impact; and an exhibition about the work of the Greek designers On Entropy (sisters Niki and Zoe Moskofoglou) called A Future for the Past.

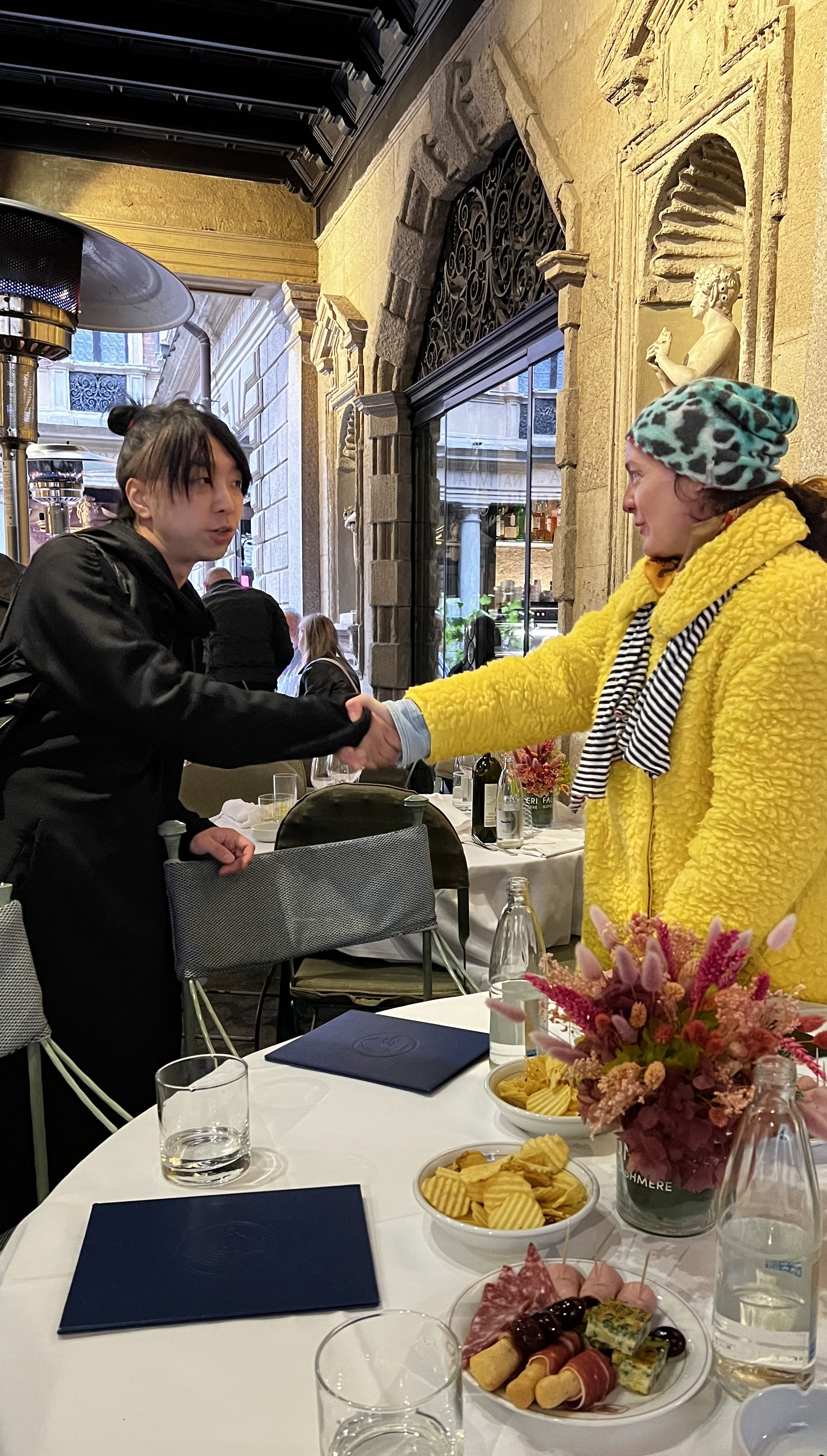
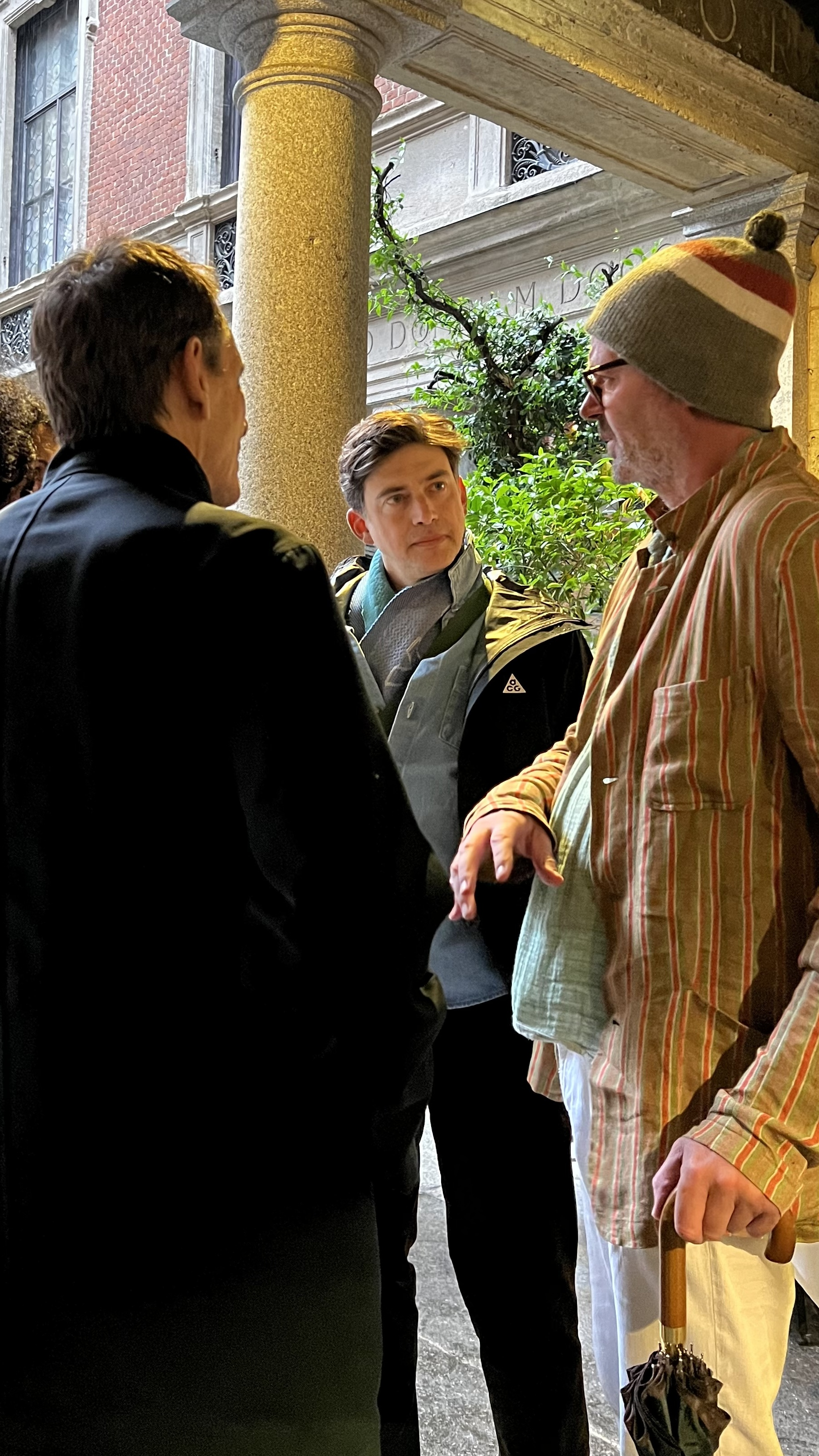
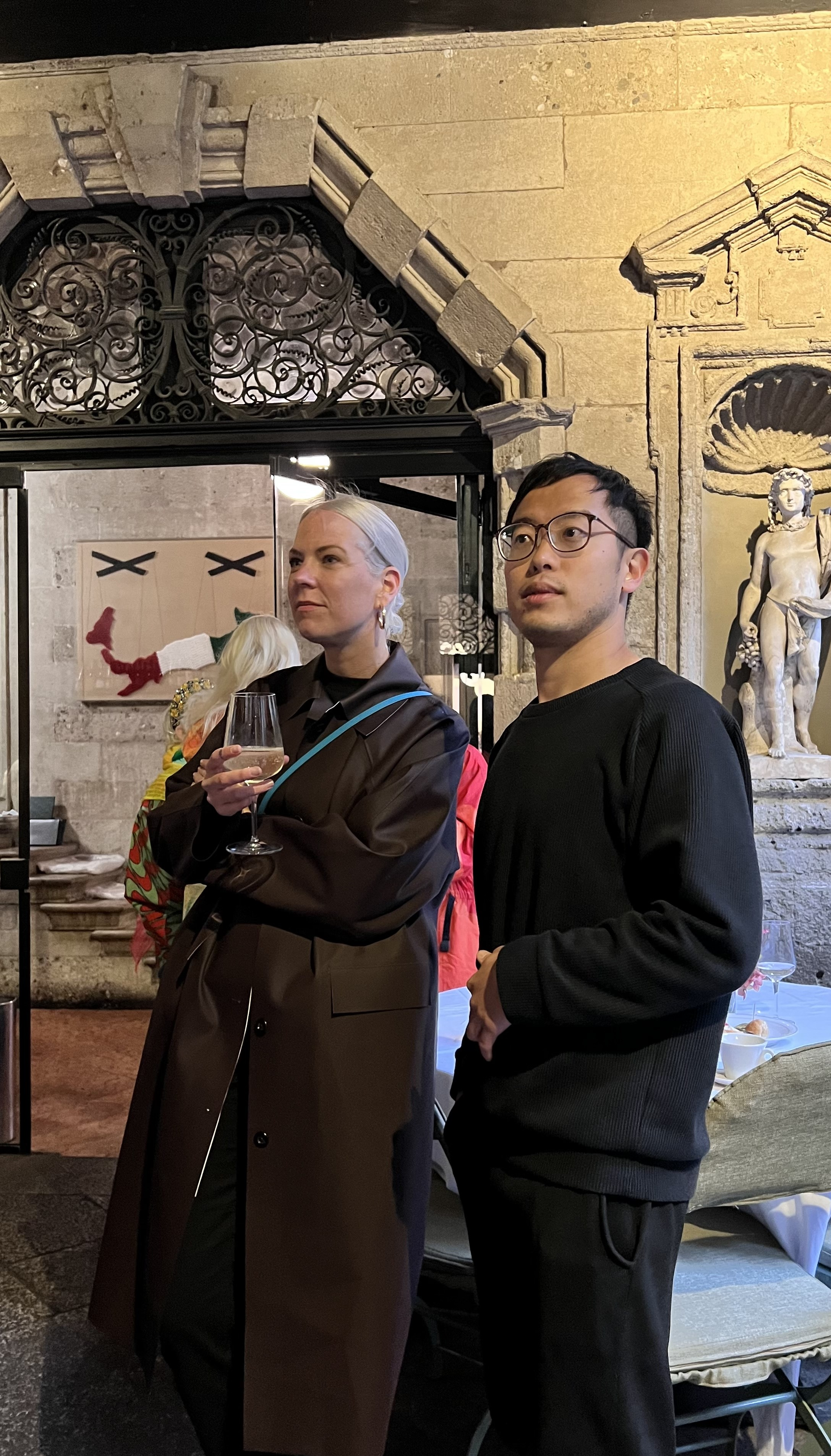
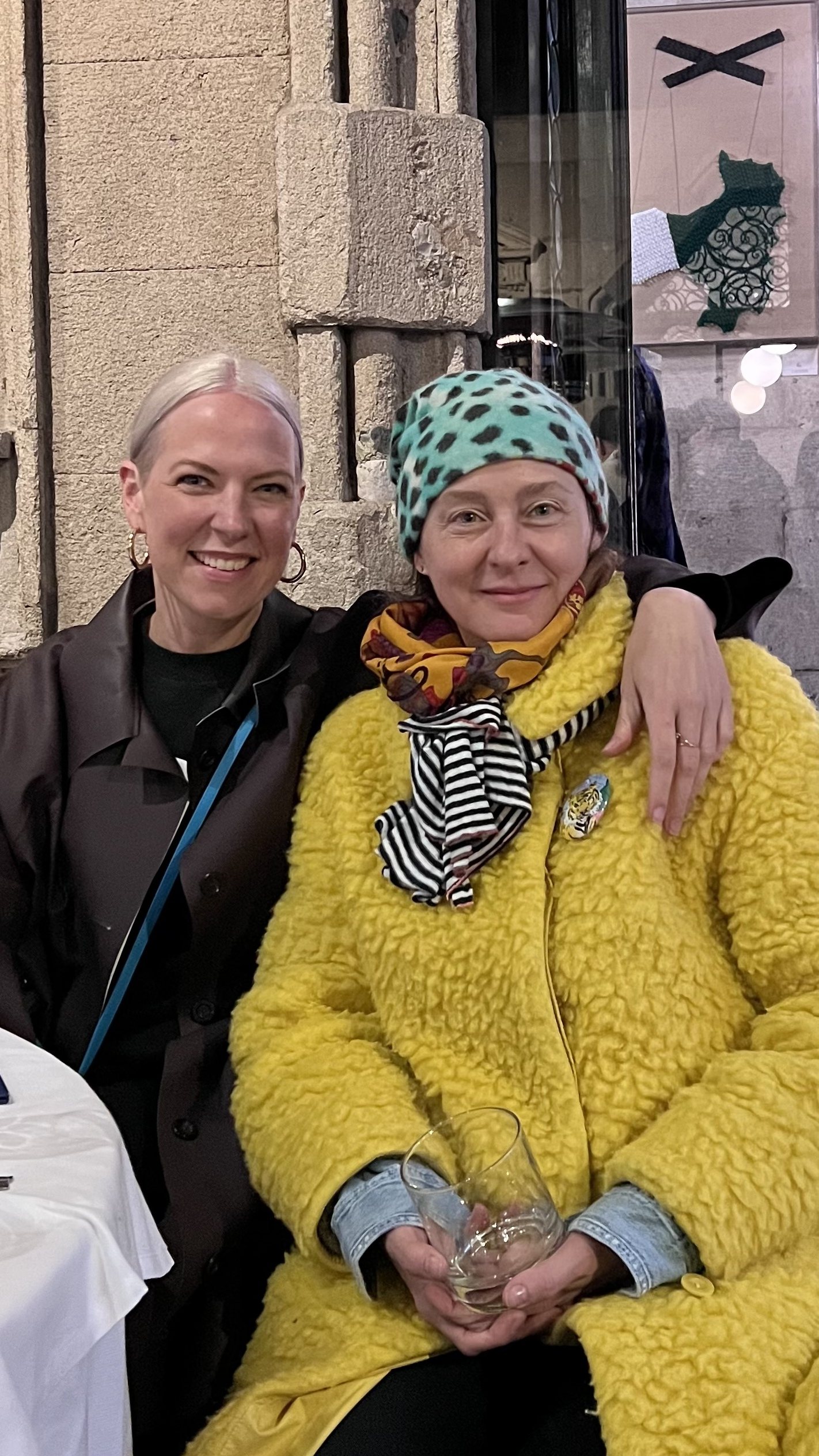
Milan reception for the Craft x Tech Tohoku Project, clockwise from upper left: Didero with Yoichi Ochiai; David Caon and Michael Young; Sabine Marcelis and Hideki Yoshimoto; Didero and Sabine Marcelis

In 2024 she curated the inaugural Tohoku edition of the Craft x Tech initiative at Kudan House in Tokyo. The initiative pairs international artists and designers with Japanese master craftspeople and "aims to fuse Japan’s traditional crafts heritage with progressive technology, with the goal of helping endangered artisan techniques survive and thrive in modern times." Didero described the initiative as "a testament to the limitless possibilities that arise when traditional craftsmanship meets modern technology." Craft x Tech was subsequently exhibited at Design Miami, and during the London Design Festival in the Victoria and Albert museum.

Reflecting on the "Golden Age" theme of her Art Basel / Design Miami curatorial debut, she is quoted as saying, "It’s aspirational, a wish and a direct invitation for us to communally consider how we could live more harmoniously with each other and Planet Earth. At the core of the theme is the idea that periods of crisis are followed by periods of great revival and progress. I hope that it taps into an optimism within the society at large. The answers to our current challenges lie in innovation within the arts, design, and, technology and respect for people’s work and lives."

In 2026 Diderot curated international exhibitions such as, 1 to a Million Design Stories at the National Museum of Oman (with the ADI Design Museum), Craft x Tech Tokai Project in Japan (with Hideki Yoshimoto), and Gaetano Pesce: Drawing Life (with Francesca Molteni) at the Center for Openness and Dialogue in Tirana, Albania.

=== Writing and other activities ===
Didero is a prolific writer who has covered topics ranging from disability and resilience; the Radical Italian design movement; contemporary design practice and sustainability; to "how an object comes to be and the creators behind these as storytellers, instead of just the object itself". She has written for Domus magazine and was editor-at-large at ICON Design from 2018 to 2020 She has been the Italian editor for Wallpaper* magazine since 2021. She has written or contributed to a number of books on design and other subjects.

A 2022 limited edition book titled People by Maria Cristina Didero presented a selection of Didero's writing drawn from over 15 years of her curatorial work. It was designed by Prague-based creative collective Okolo (Adam Štěch, Matěj Činčera, and Jan Kloss), and includes interviews with artists, curators, and designers such as Alexandra Cunningham Cameron, Maurizio Cattelan, Philippe Malouin, Oki Sato, Studio 65, Bethan Laura Wood, and Zaven (Enrica Cavarzan and Marco Zavagno).

She has also collaborated with the documentary filmmaker Francesca Molteni on several projects including Superdesign: Italian radical design 1965-75 (2017), Ask Me If I Believe In The Future (2022), and We the Others (2024), a feature length documentary about the Campana brothers.

Didero is the host of a podcast called Design Forward, which is published by the Salone del Mobile in Milan. She also lectures and teaches at universities in Italy and abroad.

== Publications ==
=== Books ===
- Panella, Ugo; Pisu, Renata; Didero, Maria Cristina (2003). Oltre: sguardi sull'handicap [Beyond: looking at disabilities] (in Italian). Milano: Charta. ISBN 978-8881584680. OCLC 54051221.
- Eccher, Danilo; Didero, Maria Cristina (2010). Stai al tuo posto [Keep your seat]. Milano: Electa. ISBN 978-88-370-7535-4. OCLC 610192068.
- Cattelan, Maurizio; Didero, Maria Cristina; Ferrari, Pierpaolo; Joannou, Dakis; Mendini, Alessandro (2014). 1968. Athens: Deste Foundation for Contemporary Art. ISBN 978-618-5039-04-2. OCLC 881608016.
- Didero, Maria Cristina; Audrito, Franco (2015). Il mercante di nuvole: Studio65, cinquant'anni di futuro (in Italian). Turin: Galleria civica d'arte moderna e contemporanea. ISBN 978-88-572-2990-4. OCLC 946143173.
- Lust, Xavier; Didero, Maria Cristina (2015). Xavier Lust: Design Stories. Oostkamp: Stichting Kunstboek BVBA. ISBN 978-90-5856-536-5. OCLC 929592571.
- Young, Michael; Didero, Maria Cristina (2016). Al(l): Projects in Aluminium by Michael Young. Oostkamp: Centre d'innovation et de design (CID). ISBN 978-90-5856-540-2. OCLC 944160332.
- Didero, Maria Cristina; Rossi, Catharine; Snyderman, Evan; Sudjic, Deyan (2017). Superdesign: Italian Radical Design 1965-75. New York, NY: The Monacelli Press. ISBN 978-1-58093-495-4. OCLC 970024068.
- Arsham, Daniel; Mustonen, Alex; Didero, Maria Cristina (2018). Snarkitecture. London: Phaidon Press. p. 256. ISBN 9780714876061.
- Didero, Maria Cristina (2022). People of Maria Cristina Didero. Prague: Okolo.
- Philpott, Alex; Pardo, Benjamin; Didero, Maria Cristina (2026). Philpott, Alex; Pearce, Oscar; Page, Kester; Slatter, Joe (eds.). The Product Design 100. London: Design Burger. ISBN 978-1-0369-5572-4.

=== Articles and other writing ===
- "Memphis: the rebirth of Negresco by Martine Bedin". Domus. Milan. April 19, 2021.
- "Interview with Ini Archibong, artist of the future-present". Domus. Milan. May 27, 2021.
- "Compact apartment by Ettore Sottsass reveals pioneering design approach". Wallpaper*. London. July 9, 2022.
- "Aldo Rossi's work and legacy celebrated". Wallpaper*. London. October 7, 2022.
- "In memoriam: Pierluigi Cerri (1939–2022)". Wallpaper*. London. December 4, 2022.
- "Triennale pays tribute to Angelo Mangiarotti with extensive retrospective". Wallpaper*. London. January 21, 2023.
- "Gaetano Pesce's last interview (1939–2024)". Domus. Milan. April 4, 2024.
- "Jasper Morrison: 'Design is the change an object brings to a space'". Domus. Milan. March 26, 2025.

=== Films ===
- Superdesign: Italian radical design 1965-75 (2017). Didero, Maria Cristina; Molteni, Francesca. Milan: Muse Factory of Projects
- We the others (2024). Didero, Maria Cristina; Molteni, Francesca. Milan: Muse Factory of Projects
