= Design Indaba =

African design conference

- Website type: Conference
- Available in: English, multilingual subtitles, transcript
- Founded: 1995; 31 years ago
- Headquarters: Cape Town, {{{location_country}}}
- Area served: Africa
- Owner: Interactive Africa
- Founder: Ravi Naidoo
- Website: designindaba.com
- Registration: Optional
- Launched: 1995; 31 years ago (first conference)
- Current status: Active

Design Indaba is a trademark and brand founded and run by Interactive Africa in 1995 with a focus on design and under the slogan "A better world through creativity". Consisting of an online publication and a series of events and creative projects, it is most widely known for its annual festival held in South Africa, in particular the flagship three-day conference hosted in Cape Town. The Design Indaba Conference is also broadcast live to various cities, most recently including Johannesburg, Durban, Nairobi, Windhoek, Kampala and Lausanne. It has also been referred to as the "Conference on Creativity".

== History ==
Design Indaba was founded with the inaugural conference in 1995, which hosted 11 speakers over two days. It has since grown to host over 30 speakers from all over the globe and has been named by many to be one of the best creative conferences in the world. In its list of top "52 Places to Go in 2014", The New York Times touted Design Indaba as "the annual visual arts spectacular" and part of the city's creative renaissance.

== Design Indaba Festival ==
The Design Indaba Conference is just one part of a weeklong creative festival, known now as the Design Indaba Festival. In its entirety the Design Indaba Festival comprises the conference, a film festival, a series of exhibitions including the annual Emerging Creatives programme , and various music events and other performances. The main event takes place in Cape Town, most recently at the Artscape Theatre Centre, and various cities in Africa and Europe also host a simulcast of the conference and peripheral exhibitions and events.

== Design Indaba Conference ==
The Design Indaba Conference has been held in Cape Town since 1995, biannually until 2001, and annually since then. Speakers at the conference represent a broad spectrum of design and the creative industries, with a focus on international thought leadership and innovative problem solving, in keeping with the company ethos of "A better world through creativity". Alongside professionals from traditional design disciplines such as architecture, product design, graphic and communication design, fashion, furniture design, design thinking and design education, the programme of recent years has included chefs, musicians, visual artists, filmmakers and founders of creative businesses on the list of Design Indaba speakers. Together the three-day Cape Town conference and simulcast host 4,500 people.

== Design Indaba Do Tank ==
Largely funded by the Design Indaba Trust and independent sponsorships, Design Indaba Do Tank consists of projects and initiatives designed for the greater good. These include the Your Street Challenge, the 10x10 Low-Cost Housing Project, Another Light Up, Sonop and Arch For Arch monument in honour of Archbishop Desmond Tutu.
