= Tansu =

Traditional Japanese mobile storage cabinets

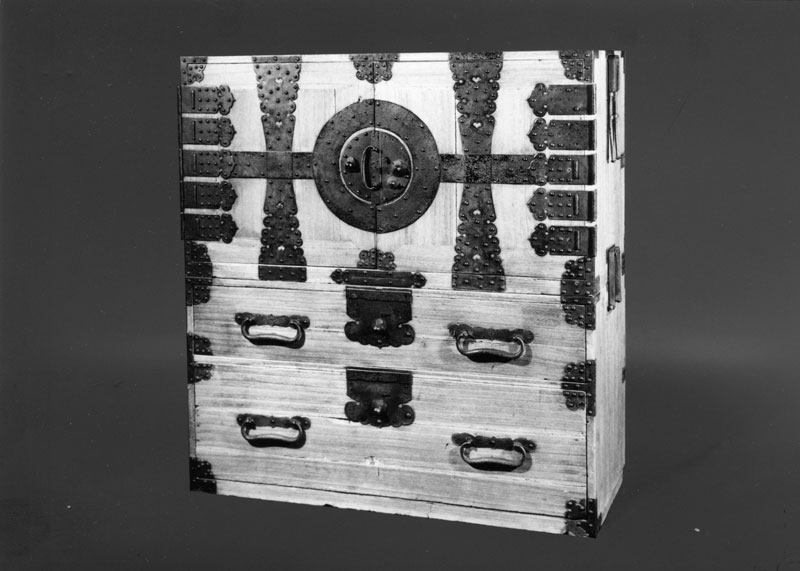
Edo-period ryobiraki chest on chest were used by merchant class women for personal clothing storage.

Tansu (箪笥) are traditional Japanese mobile storage cabinets. Tansu are commonly used for the storage of clothing, particularly kimono.

Tansu were first recorded in the Genroku era (1688–1704) of the Edo period (1603–1867). The two characters, tan (箪) and su (笥), appear to have initially represented objects with separate functions: the storage of food and the carrying of firewood. Since the radical for bamboo (竹) appears in each of these characters, it may be surmised that bamboo, and not wood, was the original material used in tansu.

As tansu gradually became a feature of Japanese culture and daily life, both hard and softwoods were used by tansuya (tansu craftsmen), often in combination for a single chest. Woods commonly used in tansu included keyaki (Zelkova serrata (elm)), kuri (Japanese chestnut), ezo matsu (pine), sugi (Cryptomeria (cedar)), kiri (Paulownia tomentosa) and hinoki (Chamaecyparis obtusa (cypress)).

Tansu are collectable, and many collectors focus on finding genuine antique tansu. There are just a few workshops who produce tansu in imitation of the classic antiques, due to the high cost of materials and the very low prices of second-hand tansu. Larger chests are sometimes reduced in size, particularly futon chests, step chests and other chests with deep drawers. Some reproduction tansu have been made in Korea using elm veneer.

== Historical context ==
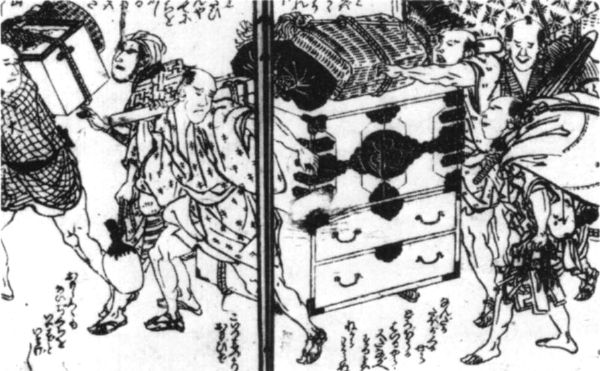
Ryobiraki tansu being carried by hired porters. Woodblock print, Utagawa Toyokuni, 1807

Tansu were rarely used as stationary furniture. Consistent with traditional Japanese interior design, which featured a number of movable partitions, allowing for the creation of larger and smaller rooms within the home, tansu would need to be easily portable, and were not visible in the home except at certain times for specific situations.

Tansu were typically kept in kura (storehouses) adjacent to homes or businesses, in nando (storage rooms), in oshiire (house closet alcoves), and on choba (a raised platform area of a shop). Tansu would also be kept on some sengokubune (coastal ships). Mobility was obtained through the use of attached wheels, iron carry handles or protruding structural upper rails for lifting.

Because the Edo period was feudal in its socio-economic structure, rules concerning the ownership of goods dominated all classes, from peasant to samurai. Travelling was regulated and conspicuous consumption discouraged through sumptuary laws. Tansu from this time primarily reflect the class and occupation of the owner rather than any regionally inspired originality. With the coming of the Meiji Restoration of imperial authority in 1868, and the gradual disintegration of the rigid class structure, distinctive regional characteristics in tansu construction and design began to flourish.

== Types ==
=== Edo period – class-determined ===
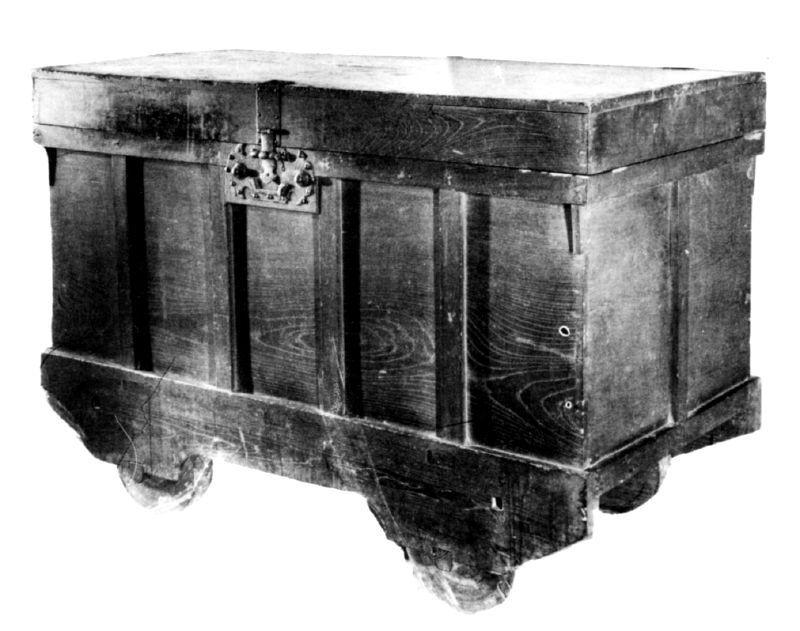
Nagamochi kuruma wheeled trunks are the oldest documented category of tansu.

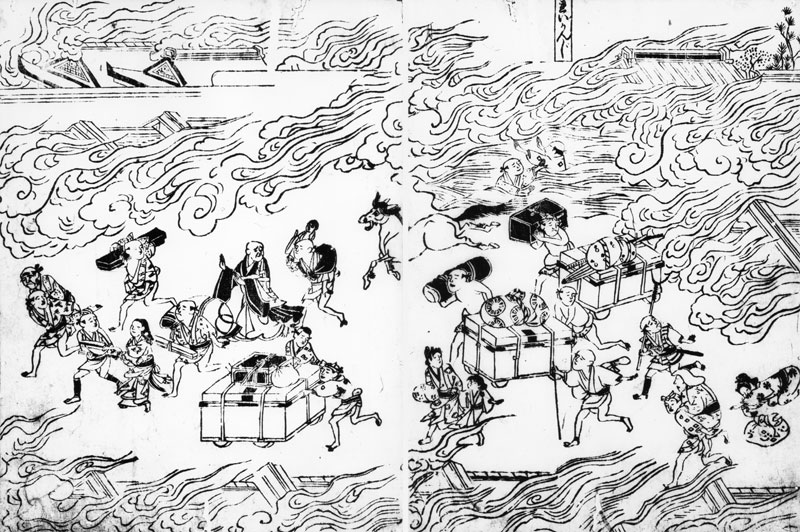
Edo citizens trying to escape advancing flames with their chests on wheels during the Great Fire of Meireki in 1657. Woodblock print taken from the Musashi Abumi published in 1661.

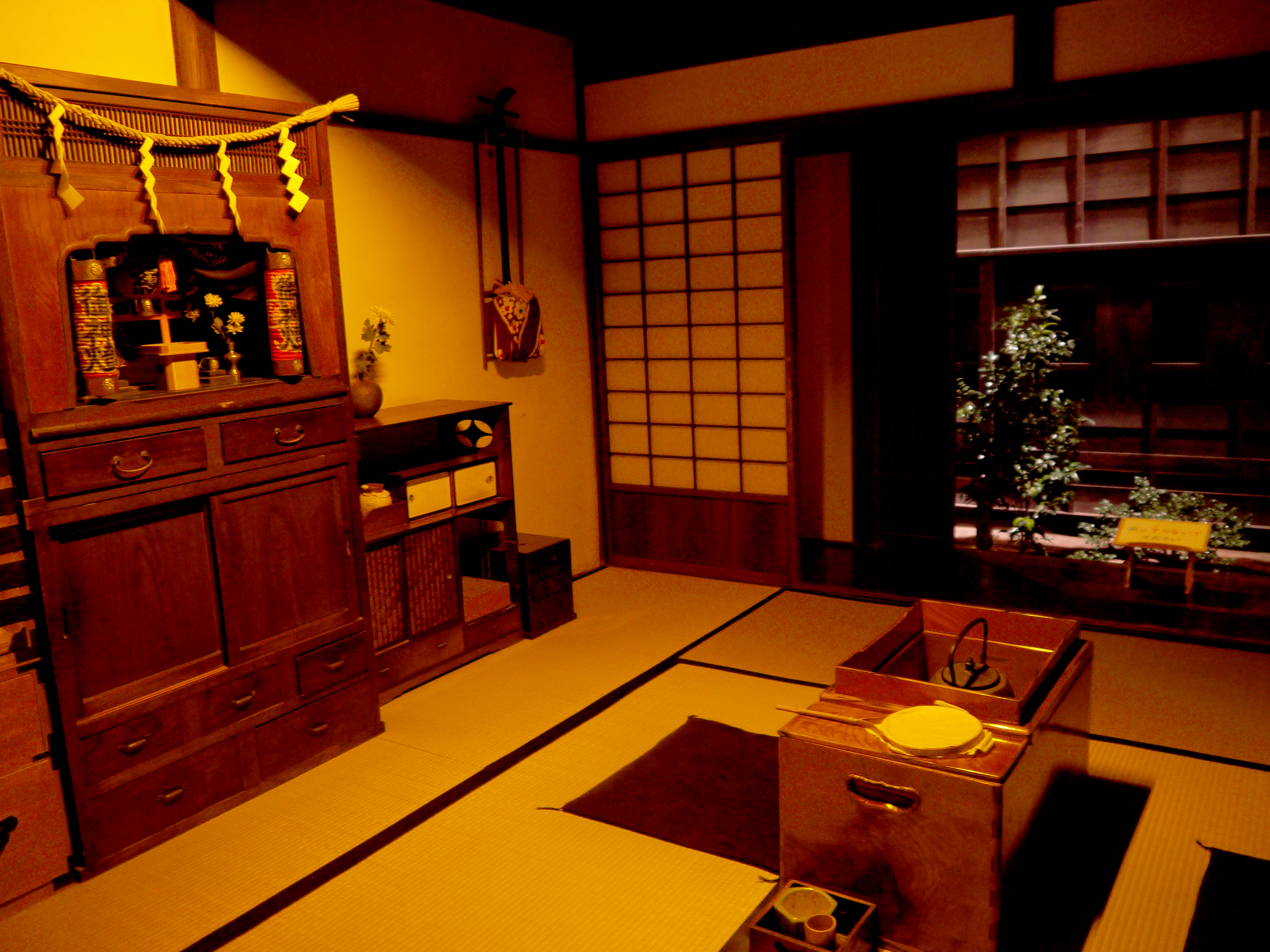
Merchant's house from the Edo to Meiji periods

During the Edo period (1603–1867), the type of tansu a person owned and used was largely determined by social class.

Choba-dansu
These chests were used by chōnin (merchants) on the choba (raised platform area of a shop) to store daifukucho (account books) and related business materials. These chests came in many sizes, but usually consisted of only one section with numerous compartments and a wide variety of interior configurations. If visible to the customer, the face wood and hardware could be of high quality to convey a favorable impression.
Kaidan-dansu (階段箪笥)
These step chests, often of modular construction, incorporated drawers and sliding doors. Though primarily intended as stationary adjuncts to the building architecture, they were designed to be moveable if necessary. In the Tōhoku region north of Tokyo, kaidan-dansu were sometimes positioned in farmhouses for attic access and the seasonal nurturing of silkworms under the thatched roofing. This use of "structural dead space" for storage, thus leaving floor space more open, is paralleled in 19th-century America by the Shakers.
Katana-dansu (刀箪笥)
A series of boxes with several long drawers for the storage of sword blades. They were used primarily by blade polishers. Most often the case wood of choice was Paulownia tomentosa (kiri) to help protect blades from oxidization in the humid summer months. The light weight of the wood also made it easier to move around between samurai customers.
Kusuri-dansu
Apothecary chests with many small drawers to contain medicinal herbs. Because the chests/boxes often needed to be carried by itinerant salesmen, they were often constructed with light-weight kiri (paulownia), or sugi (cedar) wood, and utilized iron hardware only sparingly.
Nagamochi kuruma-dansu
These coffers on wheels are the oldest documented example of Japanese mobile cabinetry. Diaries from a trade delegation to Edo (modern-day Tokyo) from the Dutch East India Company settlement on Dejima Island, Nagasaki in March 1657, refer to "big chests on four wheels" that so blocked the roads, people could not escape. What Zacharias Wagenaer and his mission witnessed by chance became known as the Great Fire of Meireki, in which 107,000 people perished.
Ryobiraki kasane-dansu
These chest-on-chest tansu were used for storage of women's clothing. This design was designated as acceptable for merchant class women under the Kansei Reforms promulgated by the shōgun's regent Matsudaira Sadanobu in 1789. In that this style of double door, two-section tansu for clothing was already popular in Edo, the limitation to only an unlacquered finish may not have been thought excessive.

=== Meiji period – regional diversification ===
During the Meiji period (1868–1911), the design of tansu developed further, seeing more regional diversification following the abolition of the feudal class system in Japan.

Hikone mizuya-dansu
Although mizuya (kitchen chests) both of a single section and chest on chest configuration have been crafted to fit into or adjacent to home kitchen alcoves since at least the mid-Edo period, the mizuya produced in the town of Hikone on Lake Biwa in Shiga Prefecture united house storage needs and traditional architecture based upon the archaic shaku unit of measurement. Using mortise and tenon joints with Chamaecyparis obtusa (cypress) (hinoki) for primary framing, craftsmen cleverly lightened the visual mass of the case by using a translucent lacquered (kijiro nuri) finish for the door and drawer face woods. For the hardware, copper rather than iron was preferred.
Kuruma choba-dansu
Chests on wheels, often constructed of the finest woods, became a status symbol for merchants throughout Japan in the Meiji period; though they originated in the Edo period, wheeled chests only experienced wider popularity beginning in the 1860s, as fear of official censure under sumptuary laws likely dampened previous demand. Although when now seen in Japan in the private collections of proud merchant families, kuruma choba-dansu are displayed in the best room of the house, this is not how they would have originally been displayed. When used for daily business activities to hold account books and impress customers, they were kept on the choba (raised platform area of a shop) by the owner's side, quite often chained to a sturdy post.
Kyoto isho-dansu
Tansu in Kyoto style were known for a sophisticated opaque lacquering technique called tama nuri. Tansu featuring lacquered flowers, auspicious symbols and motifs, well-rendered by craftsmen from Wajima on the Noto Peninsula, were a popular status symbol.
Sado shima-dansu
These chests were prized as among the finest examples of tansu craftsmanship. With funa-dansu (sea chests) as an experience base, tansuya in the town of Ogi on Sado Island applied their skill to creating both merchant and clothing chests from the later Edo period. Other than using thick iron hardware incorporating a four diamond motif cut into the drawer handle back plates, ogi-dansu often evidence ships' cabinet joinery, atypical of other tansu not crafted on the coast of the Sea of Japan. Though late as a production center, tansu makers in the town of Yahata on Sado crafted Paulownia wood chests primarily for the trousseau clothing of merchant families, with unique hardware from the early 20th century.
Sakai choba-dansu
Though now land-locked for centuries, Sakai is still thought of as the "port town" for the city of Osaka. During the Meiji period, the merchant chest design associated with Sakai successfully diffused throughout Japan. Highest quality sakai choba-dansu are constructed of "unfinished" cypress wood for drawer and door face woods with Cryptomeria (sugi) for the case. The compartments of sakai choba-dansu are known for their visually pleasing proportionality.
Sendai isho-dansu
Tansu used primarily for out-of-season clothing storage. The finest examples had open-grain Zelkova serrata (keyaki) for the face wood with Cryptomeria for the case. They are characterized by a long top drawer with an elaborated urajyo (double-action lock), or a long vertical locking bar. Chests from Sendai were respected for their finely rendered iron hardware, commissioned from former sword fitting craftsmen.
Yonezawa isho-dansu
The castle town of Yonezawa in the Tōhoku region developed a chest-on-chest style of tansu for clothing storage, strongly influenced by the refined lacquer finishing techniques of the Mikune area of the Japan Sea coast. The distinctive engraved lock plate motif of a five-petal cherry blossom with an arabesque of ivy and the placement of the kobirakido (hinged door compartment) in the top chest, rather than the lower chest, are distinguishing features.

=== Other types ===
==== Funa dansu ====
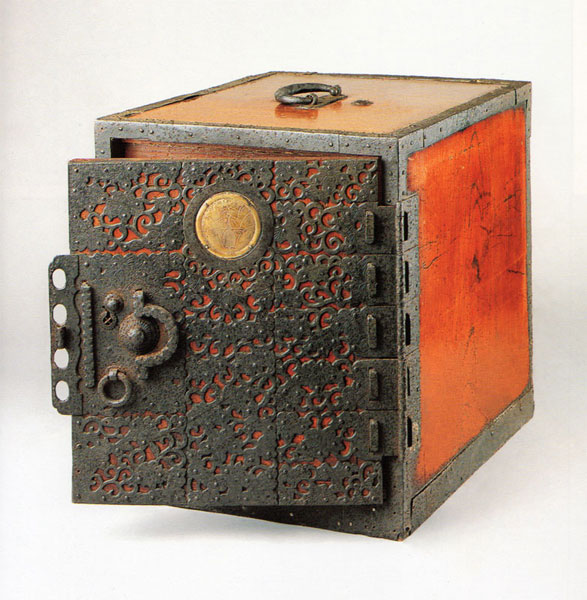
Kakesuzuri funa dansu were Edo period shipboard chests for seals, money, charts and documents.

Funa dansu (lit. 'ship's chests') were used by the captain or owner of small coastal trading vessels licensed by the feudal shogunate to transport rice. These vessels would travel from the bountiful but remote countryside to the teeming cities on the kitamae route between Osaka and Hokkaido through the Inland Sea and up the Japan Sea coast. With the enforced closure of the country in 1633 and a prohibition against the construction of ships with a keel, more than two masts and a cargo capacity exceeding 89,760 litres (19,740 imp gal; 23,710 US gal) (2,550 bushels of rice) in 1636, the shōgun inadvertently crippled the transport of rice grown on Japanese lands, resulting in shortages and even riots in some urban areas.

The problem was largely alleviated through reforms of the coastal navigation infrastructure and regulations suggested by Kawamura Zuiken in 1670. Among his implemented recommendations was the designation of reliable sea transporters of government rice as goyochonin (merchants representing the interests of the shogunate). As well, he convinced the authorities to allow properly designated vessels to trade for their own account at coastal towns en route. Though most certainly an inducement to shipping traders, there was a physical constraint that stood in the way of predictable success. The ships, though impressive in construction, were usually under 90 feet (27 m) in length, with a scant crew of eleven or less. Coastal townspeople were not always impressed when these mariners arrived.

There is evidence that from the Kyōhō era of Edo (1716–1735), specific designs of elaborate cabinetry began to be used on the kitamae route. Well into the Meiji period, when a sengokubune (1,000 koku ship) would arrive at a coastal town for trading, the crew would ceremoniously off load the captain/owner's personal tansu to be then positioned strategically at the place where negotiations would be held, thus lending a calculated air of affluence and respectability to the visitor's aura.

Funa-dansu evolved into three categories of design:

- Kakesuzuri: A seals and money chest with a single hinged door often covered by intricate iron plating, with multiple interior drawers or door covered compartments.
- Hangai: A clothing chest with a single drop-fit door. Often made as a set of two identical chests, designed so one could be placed on top of the other, then locked together.
- Cho-bako: A chest for accounting and writing related materials. Often rendered in many different configurations, some of which included the following features:
  - Kendon-buta: A drop-fit door cut into the case, used to hide a money box.
  - Kobiraki-do: A small swinging door in the lower-right corner.
  - Ryobiraki-do: Double doors with half-faced hinges on the lower half of the box.
  - Dezura hikidashi: One or two drawers, exposed to the exterior.
  - Hiki-do: Removable double sliding doors, running the full width of the box, appearing on the top third or middle third of the box.
  - Zuri-do: Removable single sliding door in the lower half of the box, in the lower-left. Typically appeared with a kobiraki-do.

Funa-dansu that were intended for shipboard use were always constructed of Zelkova serrata (keyaki) for all exterior exposures, with Paulownia wood for interior compartments and drawer or box linings.

== Types of hardware ==
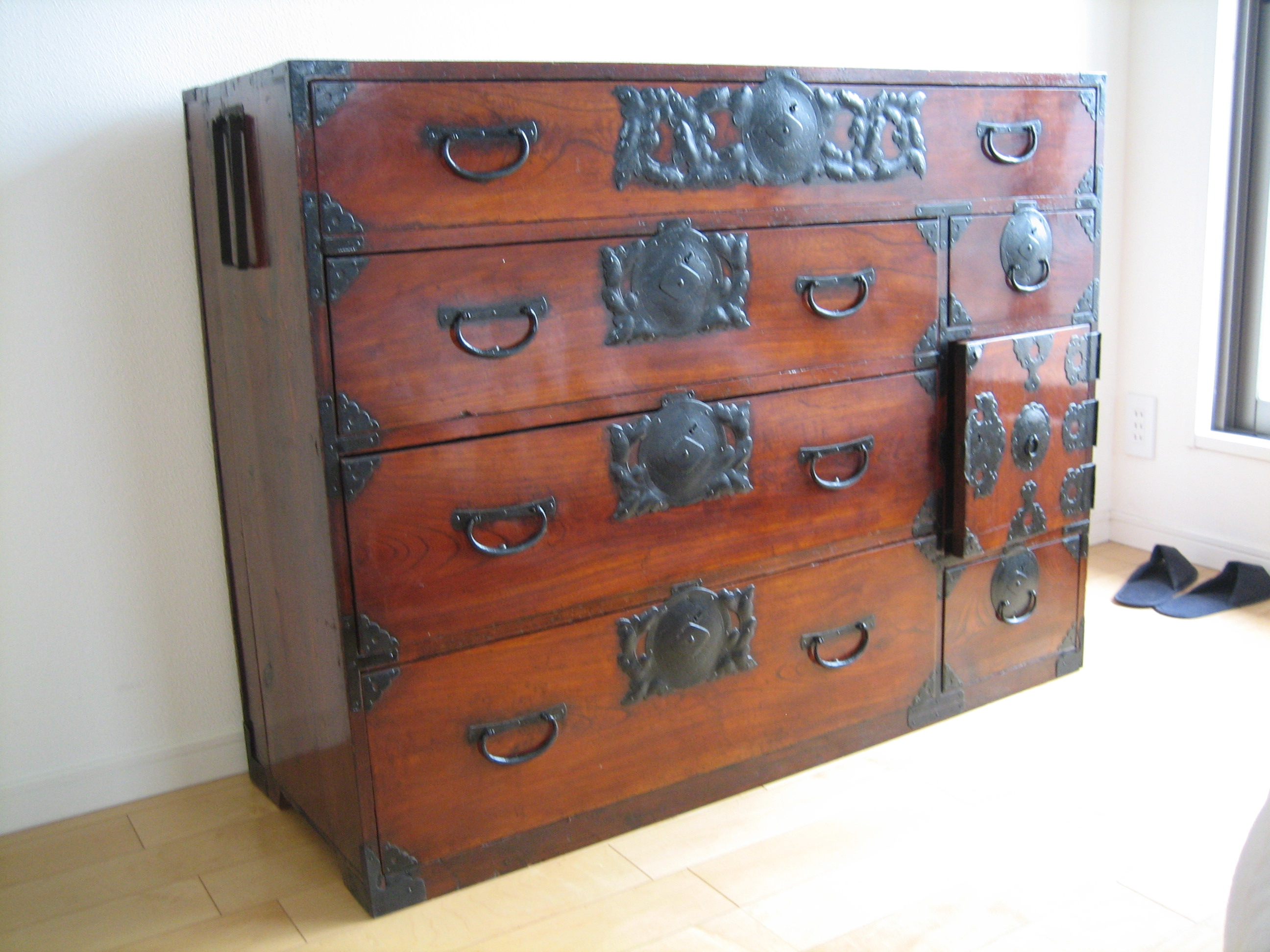
Sendai-dansu for kimono with zelkova wood; note the elaborate ironwork, handles on side for transportation, and lockable compartment.

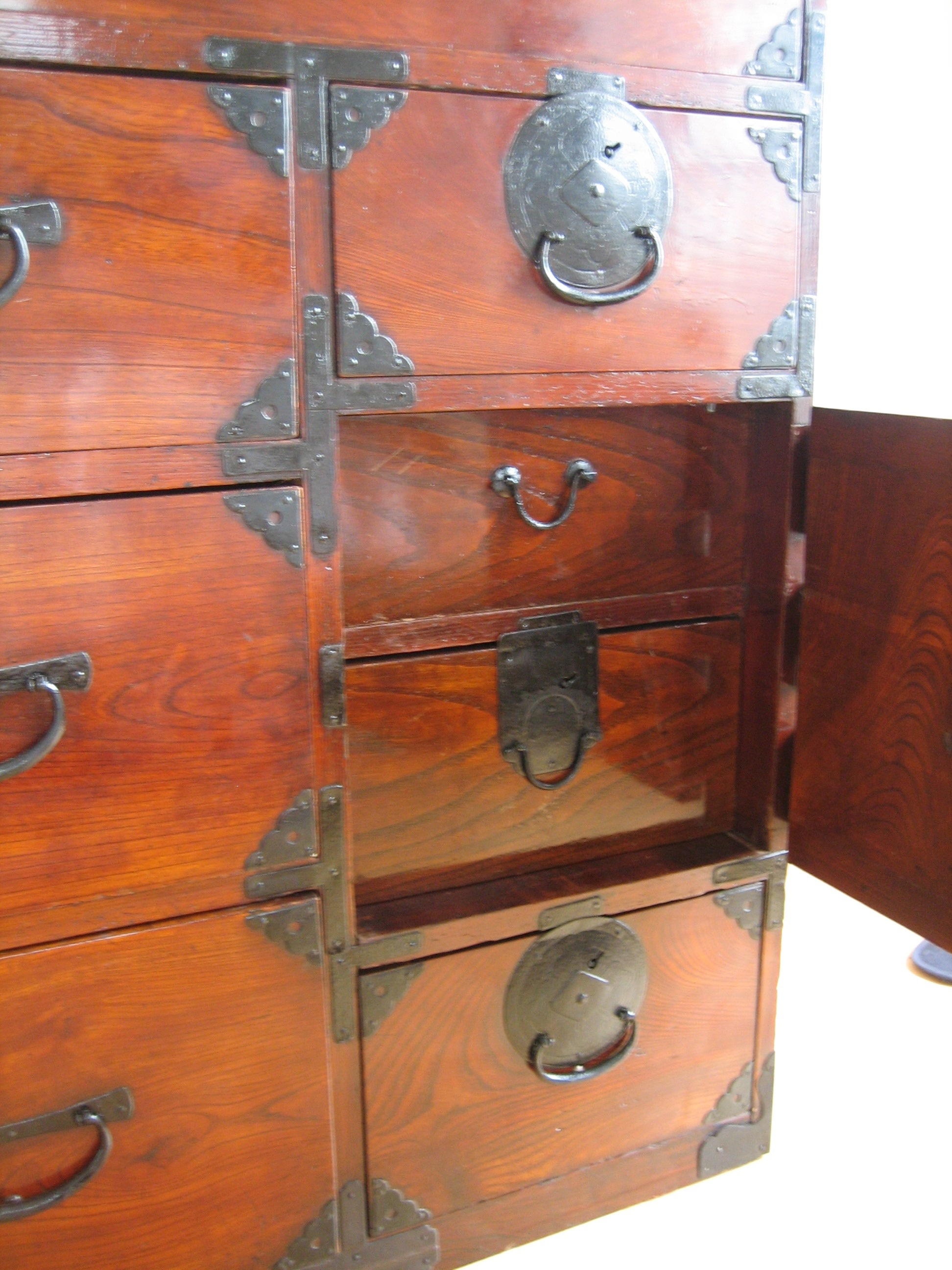
Detail of lockable compartment of a sendai-dansu

Although decorative to the contemporary eye, tansu hardware remained largely functional through the Meiji period. Because the joinery of cases was simple and thus flexible to facilitate structural integrity during movement from place to place, hardware placement at vulnerable points was consistent with the need for reliability. Until the introduction of iron plate pressing from England in the 1880s, all iron for hardware was forged. With the introduction of Western technology, tansu hardware could now be easily made more decorative, with creative embellishments as well as functional ones.

- Herikanagu: Edge hardware, lining the edges and corners of a tansu.
- Obikanagu: "Sash hardware" which spans a face of the tansu, such as the top, or the face of a cabinet door.
- Sumikanagu: Drawer or drawer-corner hardware, appearing at the corners of drawer faces. Generally these match their associated edge hardware.
- Mochiokuri: A carrying handle, generally a loop appearing on the side near the top.
- Sao-toshi: A different type of carrying loop, usually sliding, which was designed to hold a pole when used with its mate on the other side.
- Meita: Lock jamb plate
- Sashikomijo: Sliding-door lock
- Bo: Vertical locking bar
- Hikite: Drawer pull
- Zagane: An "escutcheon", or flange, surrounding the contact point of a drawer pull.
- Toshi-zagane: Back plate for a drawer pull
- Choban: Hinge
- Kasugai: Staple affixing hardware to the wood
- Omotejo: A single-action lock using a split spring for activation. For unlocking only.
- Urajo: A double-action lock mechanism of foreign origin dating from the 1860s.

== Finishes ==
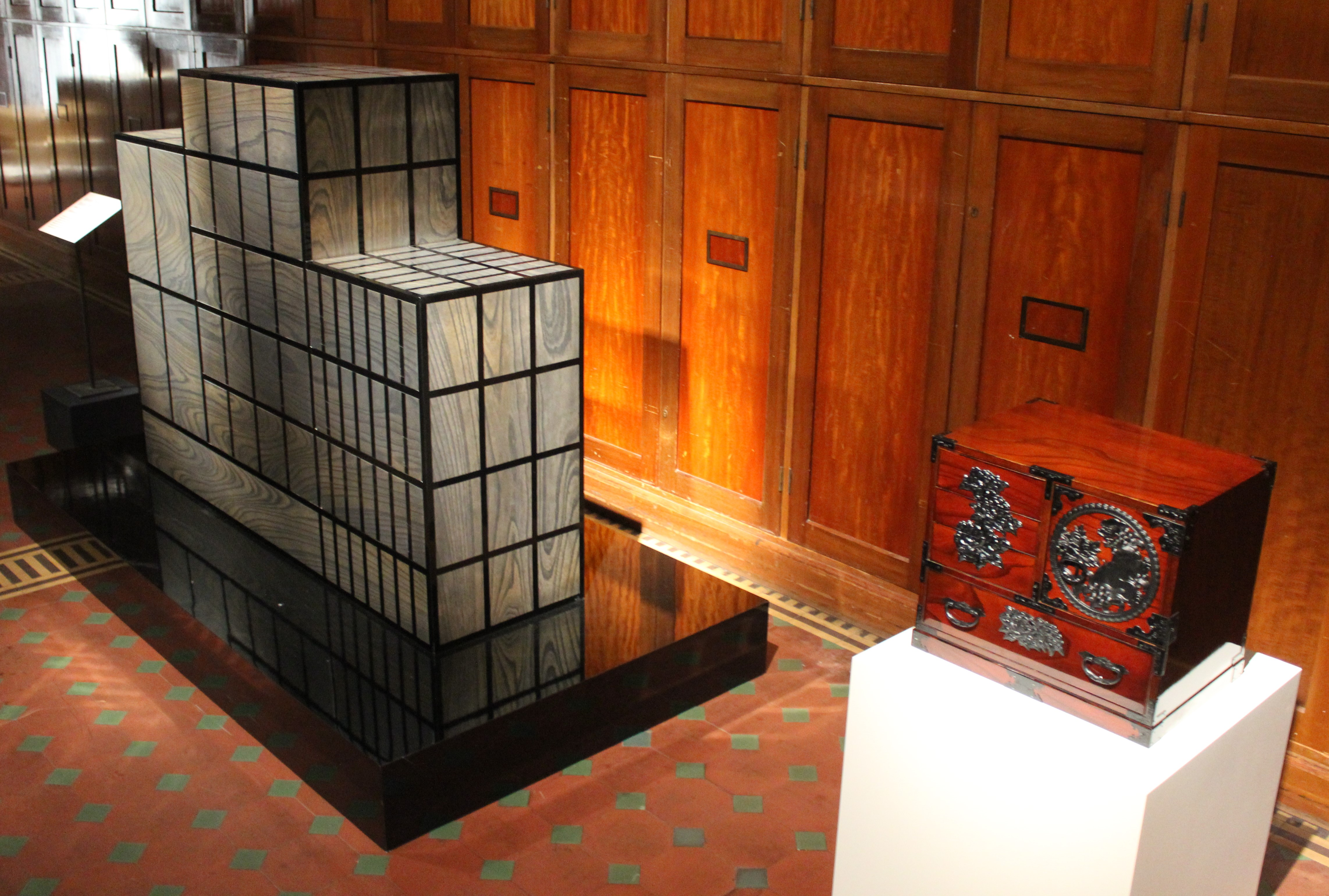
A modern interpretation and a traditional sendai-dansu chest in the Prince Consort Gallery, V&A, London (2024)

Tansu finishes fall into two categories: dry and lacquered. For a dry finish, clay or chalk powder was rubbed into the soft wood surface (Paulownia, Cryptomeria or cypress) then burnished with an Eulalia root whisk. For lacquer (Rhus verniciflua), application could be only for sealing the plain wood to enhance a natural visible grain or for the creation of a perfect opaque surface.

== See also ==
- Mizuya (a preparation area in a Japanese tea house)
- Mizuya tansu (traditional Japanese pantry)
- Miya Shoji
- Hoosier cabinet
- List of Traditional Crafts of Japan
