= Luca Nichetto =

Italian industrial designer

- Born: Venice
- Education: Università Iuav di Venezia
- Known for: Industrial design
- Website: nichettostudio.com

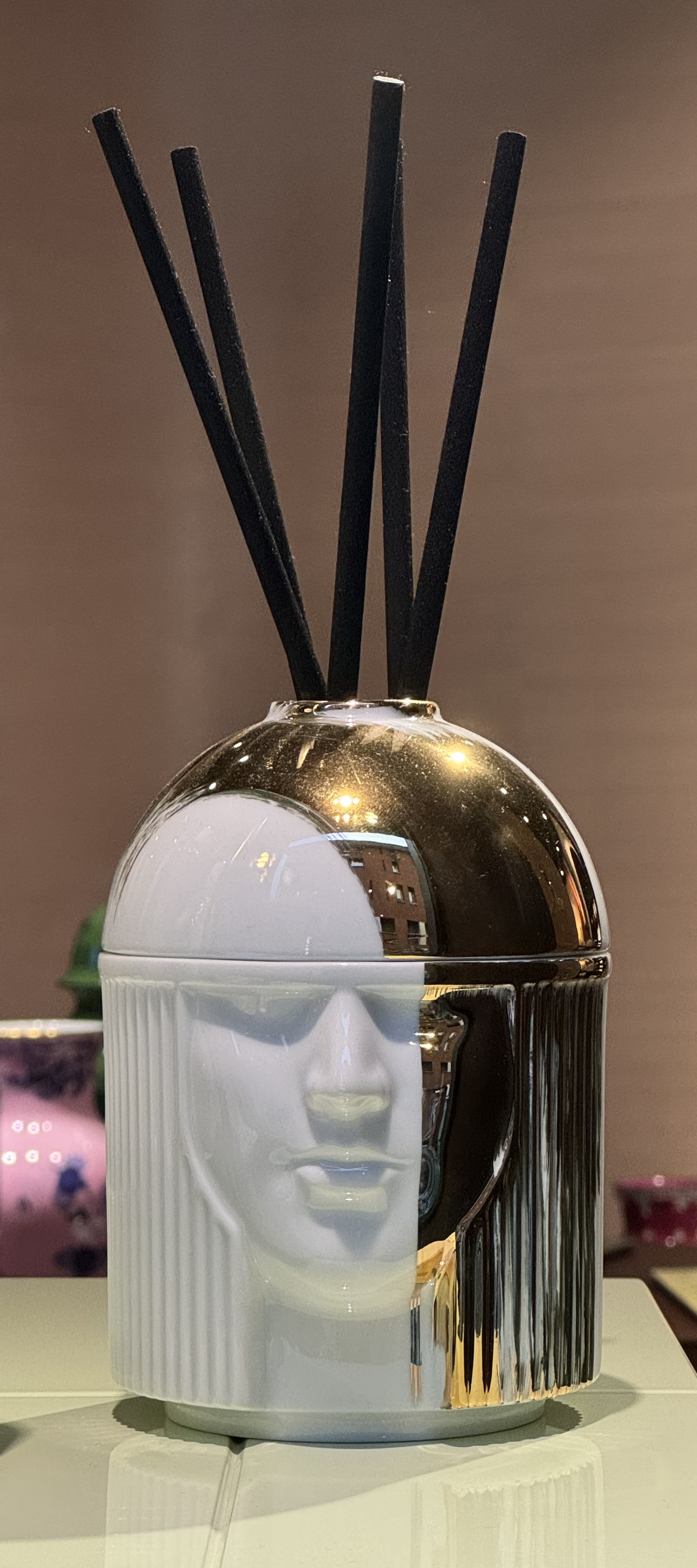
L'Amazzon diffuser by Nichetto for Ginori 1735 (c. 2024)

Luca Nichetto is an Italian industrial designer and creative director based in Stockholm. He is most well known for his work with Ginori 1735, Hermès, Foscarini, Cassina, And Tradition and Steinway & Sons.

== Biography ==
Nichetto was born in 1976 in Venice. He had sold designs to factories during his holidays in school. He schooled at the Istituto Statale d’Arte in Venice and graduated in 1998 with a degree in industrial design from Università Iuav di Venezia (IUAV). The subsequent year saw him join forces with Salviati, and he later took on roles as a product designer and consultant for the lighting firm Foscarini. In 2006, he ventured into establishing his own firm, Nichetto Studio, in his hometown. By 2011, he relocated to Stockholm, Sweden, to start a family and launch a second studio.

The 2021 exhibition Emphatic: Discovering a Glass Legacy at Punta Conterie Gallery in Murano included works by Nichetto, who also curated the exhibition. Designers Ini Archibong, Noé Duchaufour-Lawrance, GamFratesi, Benjamin Hubert, Richard Hutten, Elena Salmistraro, and Marc Thorpe also participated.

== Selected works ==
- LCDC La Compagnia Di Caterina, Ginori 1735
- Mythological Renaissance installation, Hermès
- Brand, product and retail concept, La Manufacture
- Steinway & Sons
- Cassina Torei
- Foscarini Kurage
- Decode/Recode with Ben Gorham for Salviati
- Flora Flutter windows display Barovier & Toso
- And Tradition Lato table
