= Ini Archibong =

Nigerian-American artist and designer

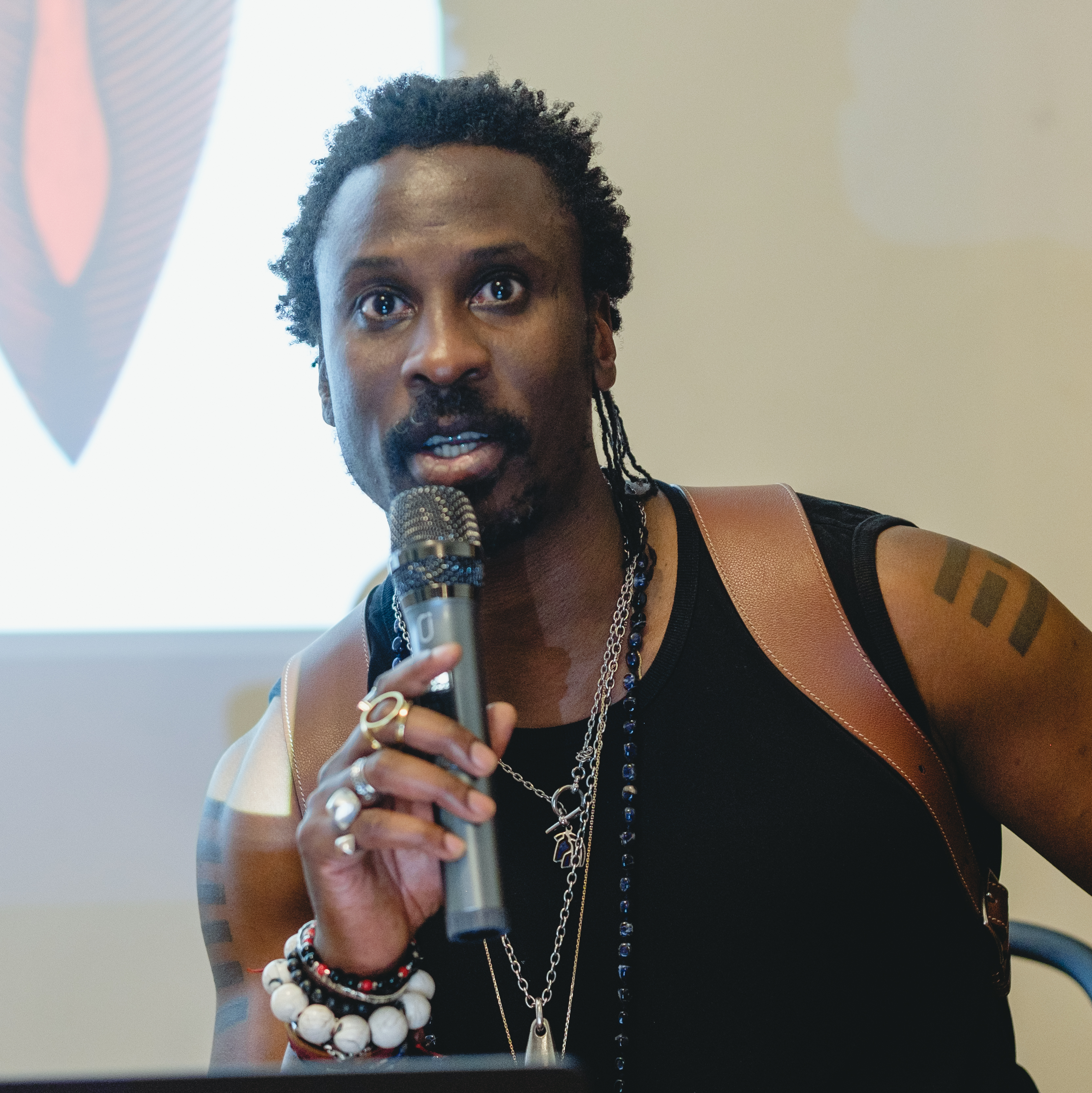
- Archibong speaking during a lecture series at the University of Tokyo, May 2024
- Born: 1983; Pasadena
- Alma mater: Polytechnic School; ArtCenter College of Design; École cantonale d'art de Lausanne
- Occupation: Designer, artist, writer, musician
- Relatives: Koko Archibong, Archie Archibong
- Website: designbyini.com

Inimfon "Ini" Joshua Archibong (born 1983) is an American-born Nigerian artist and designer. His work reflects an interest in master-craftsmanship and its relationship to technology, as well as mathematics, philosophy, and world religions. Speaking about the difference between art and design, he said "The idea that something has to be useless in order to be art is something I reject."

== Early life and education ==
Archibong was born on 23 June 1983 and raised in Pasadena, California. His parents were Nigerian emigrants who came to the United States on academic scholarships.

He graduated from the Polytechnic School, then briefly attended the University of Southern California's business school before dropping out. He subsequently enrolled at ArtCenter College of Design where he was both an Edwards Entrance Scholar and an Art Center Outreach Grant recipient, was also named the 2010 Student Designer of the Year, and from which he received a degree in Environmental Design.

After graduation, he joined Eight Inc. in Singapore for several years, before continuing his studies at the École cantonale d'art de Lausanne (ÉCAL), where he earned a master's of advanced studies in Design for Luxury and Craftsmanship.

== Career ==
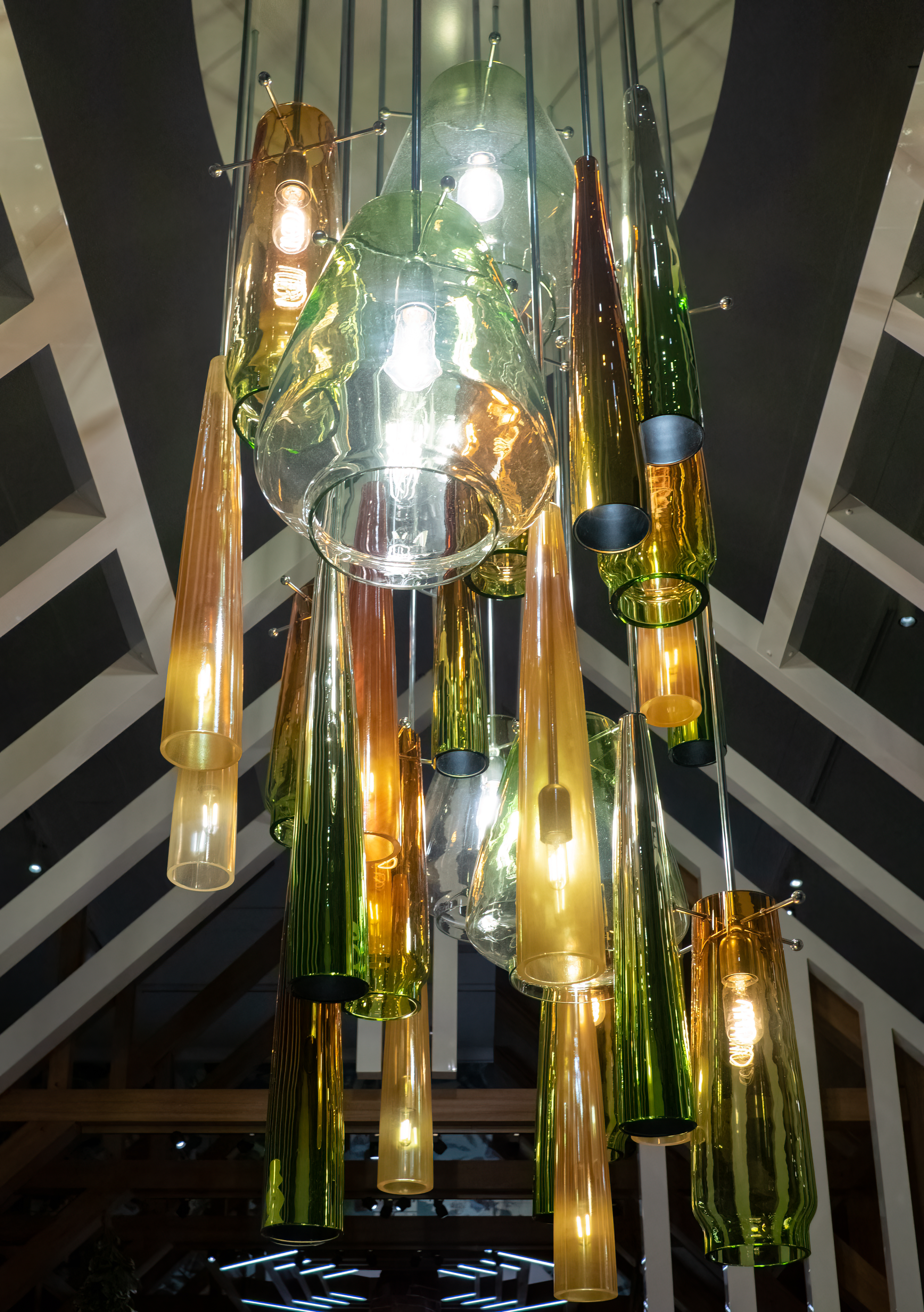
Vernus 3, on display in the Metropolitan Museum of Art exhibition, Before Yesterday We Could Fly

Archibong began exhibiting his work at the Milan Furniture Fair in the mid-2010s. His 2016 furniture collection titled The Secret Garden was produced with the support of the actor Terry Crews. This was followed by several exhibitions of his furniture designs for Sé Collections at the Rossana Orlandi gallery. He began an ongoing collaboration with the Knoll furniture company in 2018 creating designs such as the "Iquo Cafe Collection". In 2019 Hermès began marketing Archibong's "Galop d'Hermès" wristwatch. In 2020, Archibong started working on the creation of sculptural pieces for a solo exhibition at the Friedman Benda Gallery in New York.

In addition to his artwork and design practice, Archibong has taught at several design institutions and is a visiting professor at his alma mater ÉCAL, and has also taught at the International Institute for Management Development (IMD) in Lausanne and the National University of Singapore in Singapore. He has also lectured and spoken internationally including at the College Art Association conference, USC School of Architecture, and in Dubai and Design Indaba in Cape Town.

In 2019 Archibong founded L.M.N.O. CREATIVE, a multi-disciplinary design collective. The collective includes fellow graduates from Pasadena's ArtCenter, Jori Brown and Maxwell Engelmann, as well as designer Ebony Lerandy, who studied under Archibong at ÉCAL.

In 2021 the New York Times published an essay by Archibong titled What We Believe About Storytelling. The essay is part of a series called The Big Ideas: What Do We Believe, and was later published in a compendium titled Question Everything: A Stone Reader.

In 2023, Archibong began working with Dr Dre and Snoop Dogg on the concept, packaging, and graphic identity for a new brand to celebrate the 30th anniversary of the 1993 single Gin and Juice. The resulting products include a canned alcoholic drink brand called Gin & Juice that was released in 2024. The design features an "explicit content" Parental Advisory logo and illustrations by the artist Wayne Johnson. A Venetian glass bottle design for a gin called "Still G.I.N.", a reference to Dr Dre's 1999 single Still D.R.E., was released later in the same year, followed by a HexClad cocktail shaker in 2025. Archibong was also named creative director of Gin & Juice, "where he'll oversee graphic identity, design language, future packaging concepts and visual presentation for the brand."

Other clients include companies such as de Sede, Bernhardt Design, Diageo, and Logitech.

== Awards and exhibitions ==
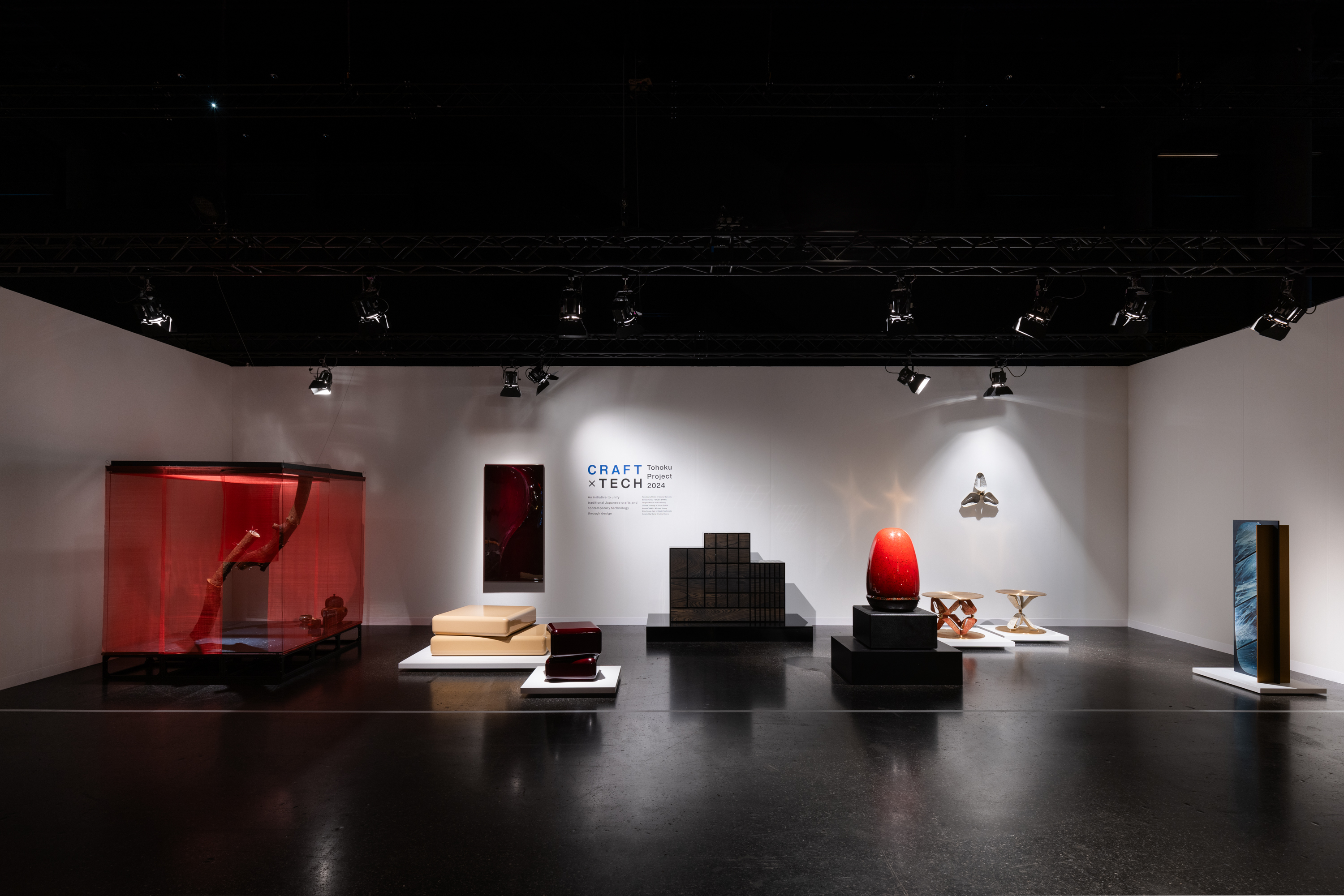
Craft x Tech Tohoku Project at Design Miami Art Basel (2024)

He is the recipient of the ICFF Studio Award, Best of NeoCon Silver, International Woodworking Fair's Design Emphasis Award, ICFF's American Student Designer of the Year Award, and the 2019 Elle Deco American Design Award. In 2019, he received Distinguished Alumni awards from both ArtCenter and Polytechnic in his hometown of Pasadena.

Archibong's work has been exhibited at the Victoria and Albert Museum in London (V&A), Alyce de Roulet Williamson Gallery in Pasadena, Galerie Triode in Paris, the Museo Bagatti Valsecchi in Milan, Spazio Rossana Orlandi in Milan, Design Indaba in Cape Town, the Dallas Museum of Art, the High Museum in Atlanta, and the Design Museum in London.

His design for a Pavilion of the African Diaspora (PoAD) won the Best Design Medal at the London Design Biennale at Somerset House in June 2021. In the same year, the Metropolitan Museum of Art (MET) in New York acquired his "Orion" table, "Atlas" chair and "Vernus 3" chandelier for its Afrofuturist Period Room.

The 2021 exhibition Emphatic: Discovering a Glass Legacy at Punta Conterie Gallery in Murano included works by Archibong, as well as the designers Noé Duchaufour-Lawrance, GamFratesi, Benjamin Hubert, Richard Hutten, Luca Nichetto, Elena Salmistraro, and Marc Thorpe. In 2022 the Los Angeles County Museum of Art (LACMA) added Archibong's "Switch" table to its permanent collection. The table also featured in his second solo show, titled Narthex, at the Friendman Benda gallery in Los Angeles. His Iquo Cafe Collection for Knoll received a Good Design award in 2022.

Archibong's work was included in the exhibition Mirror Mirror: Reflections on Design at Chatsworth at Chatsworth House (2023), as well as The New Transcendence, a group show at Friedman Benda Gallery in New York also featuring works by Andrea Branzi, Stephen Burks, Najla El Zein, Courtney Leonard, and Samuel Ross (2024).

Museum visitor interacting with the theremin element of Artifact #VII by Archibong and Tsugaru Nuri lacquer, Prince Consort Gallery, V&A (2024)

A collaboration between Archibong and Tsugaru Nuri Japanese lacquerware was unveiled at an exhibition called Craft x Tech Tohoku Project at Kudan House in Tokyo (2024). Described as a "musical instrument in the form of a large organic pod-shaped sculpture ... [that] emits otherworldly electronic sounds when human hands hover above its lacquered surfaces", the piece and the exhibition itself seeks to marry heritage master-crafts techniques with contemporary technology. The show was curated by Maria Cristina Didero, and also included works by Sabine Marcelis, Studio Swine, Yoichi Ochiai, Michael Young, and Hideki Yoshimoto. The work was also exhibited at Design Miami Art Basel and in the Prince Consort Gallery of the V&A London.

In 2025, he unveiled an installation for Port Ellen in Islay. The sculptural piece was commissioned by the distillery in celebration of its 200th anniversary.

== Personal life ==
Archibong lives and works in Neuchâtel, Switzerland. He has a daughter. He is the younger brother of Olympic athlete Koko Archibong.

== See also ==
- Notable Alumni, Polytechnic School
- List of ArtCenter College of Design people
- Notable alumni, École cantonale d'art de Lausanne
- Notable Designers, Knoll, Inc.
