= Before Yesterday We Could Fly =

Exhibit at the Metropolitan Museum of Art

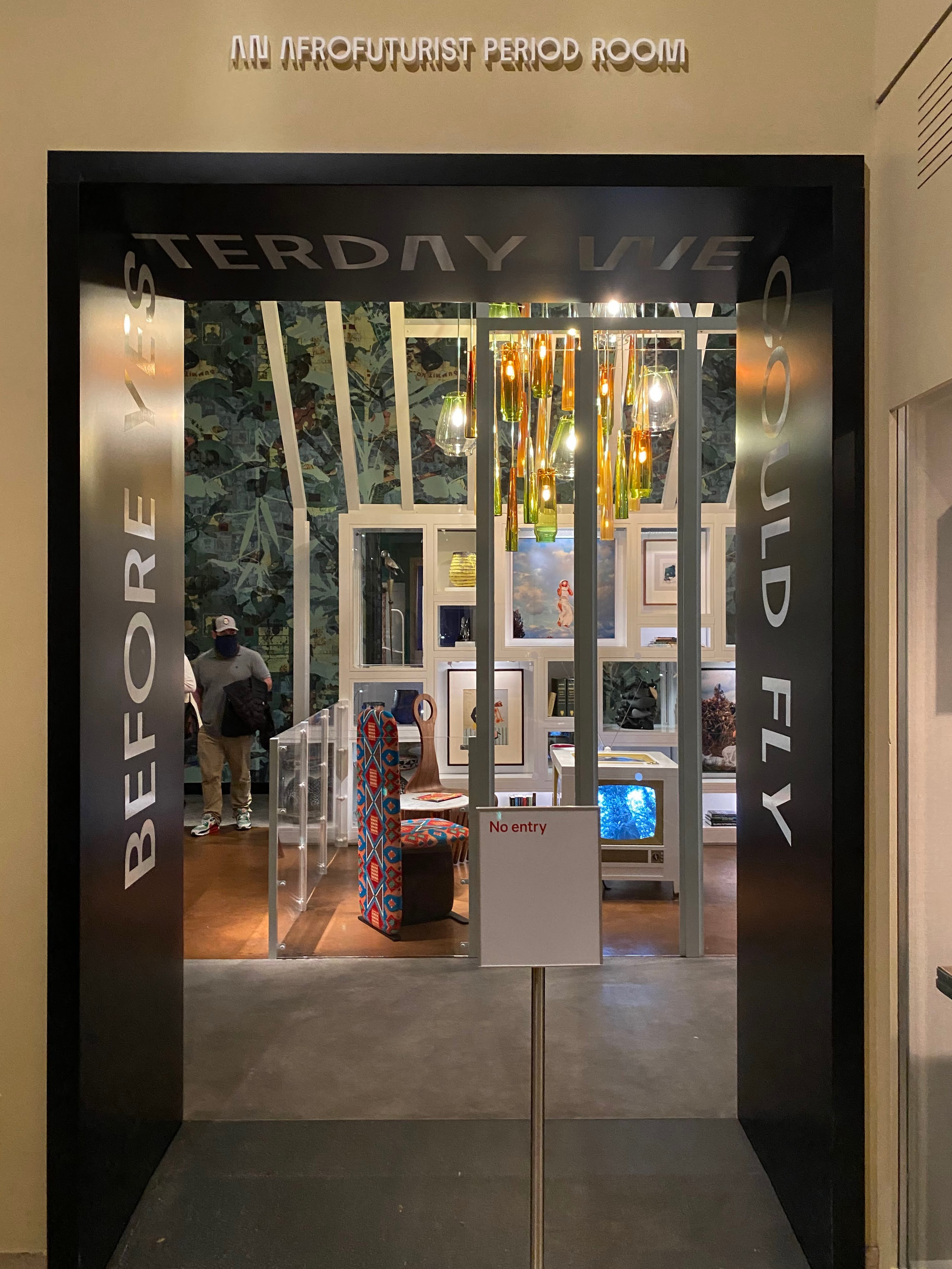
Met Afrofuturist period room, December 2021

Before Yesterday We Could Fly: An Afrofuturist Period Room is an art exhibition at the Metropolitan Museum of Art in New York City. The exhibit, which opened on November 5, 2021, uses a period room format of installation to envision the past, present, and future home of someone who lived in Seneca Village, a largely African American settlement which was destroyed to make way for the construction of Central Park in the mid-1800s.

== Background and description ==
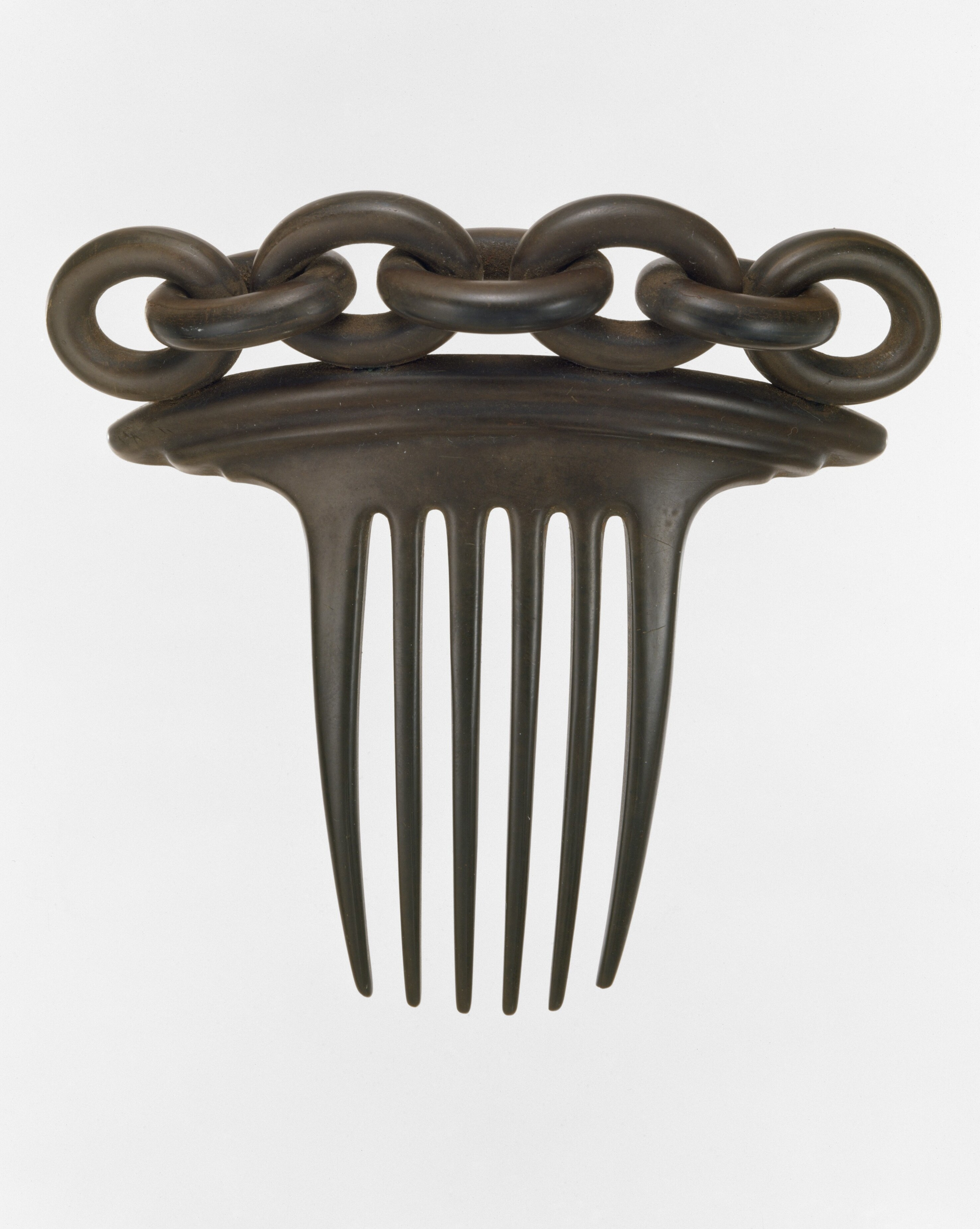
A rubber hair comb in the exhibit, evoking another comb uncovered during the Seneca Village Project.

Period rooms are common, immersive museum installations which recreate an interior from a particular time and place by curating art, architecture, furniture, and other objects from that era. Before Yesterday We Could Fly began with a question of what a period room could be if it were not set in the past, but in the present or future. The form has been subject to some criticism for providing idealized historical scenes which, according to co-curator Sarah Lawrence, are ultimately "complete fiction" and largely "white affluent Eurocentric interiors". According to Artnet's Darla Migan, they also reinforce "a general sense of cultural superiority among those who have inherited the benefits of gentry and labor".

Before Yesterday We Could Fly intentionally challenges what it means to be a period room by limiting the extent to which it purports historical authenticity. The exhibition focuses on Seneca Village, a 19th-century settlement of mostly African American landowners in the borough of Manhattan in New York City. In 1857, city officials forced its residents out in order to construct Central Park, justifying its use of eminent domain with racist stereotypes. The Met's location in Central Park is just east of where Seneca Village stood. The period room in the exhibit recreates the house of a fictional Seneca Village resident as it may have existed at the time, but also how their descendants may have lived in the present and future, as if the settlement had not been destroyed. The latter parts are influenced by Afrofuturism, an art genre, aesthetic, and philosophy which imagines possible futures through the lens of the African diaspora, touching on themes of imagination, self-determination, technology, and liberation. Co-curator Ian Alteveer said that because few records and remnants remain of Seneca Village, even the recreation of the past needed some "speculative imagination".

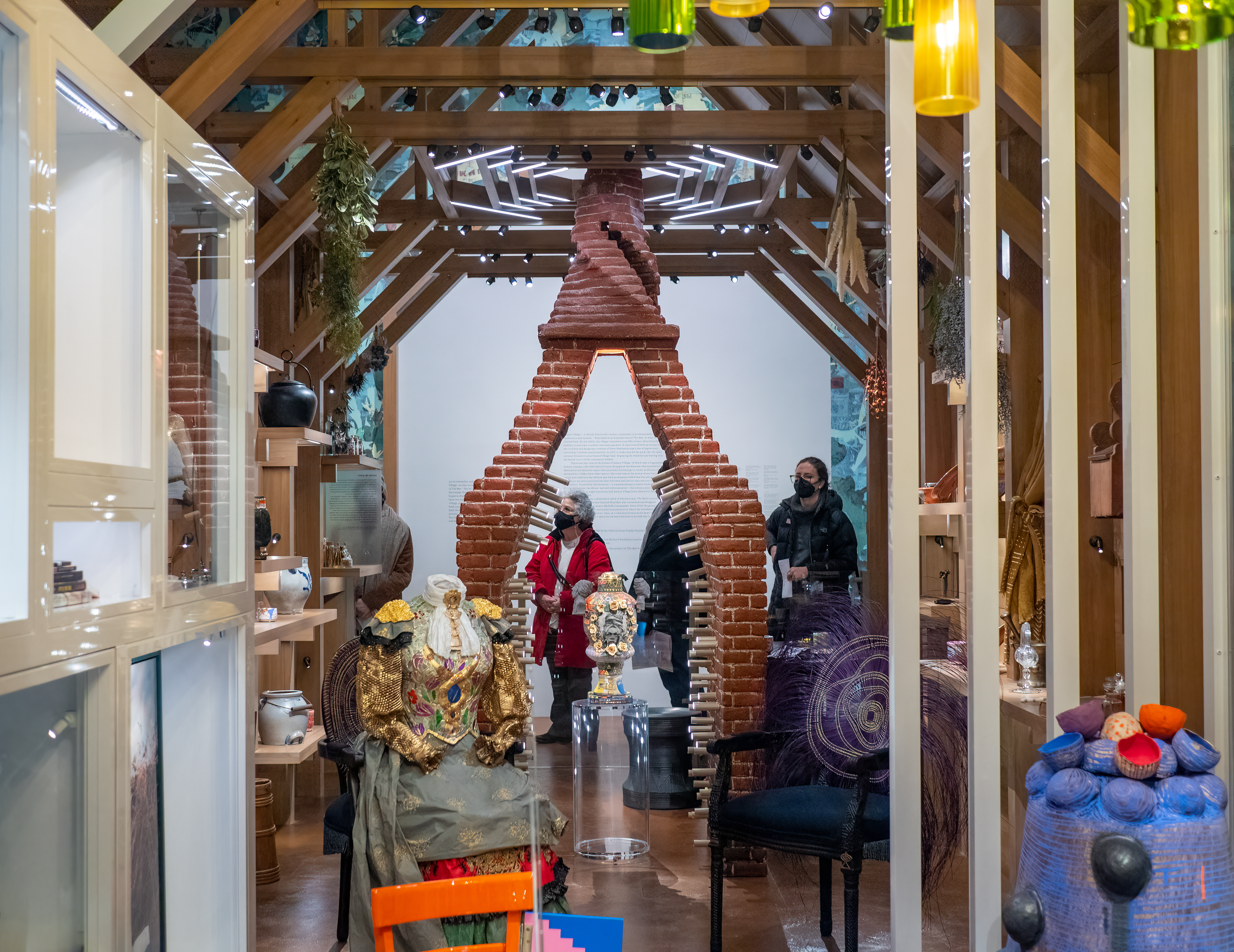
The exhibit as viewed from the "living room" side

The room, on the first floor of the museum, takes the form of a clapboard house typical of the 19th century, with an open kitchen centered on a hearth, and a living room centered on a television. Visitors walk around the room rather than through it, able to see inside from the ends and from gaps in the walls. The kitchen area largely comprises objects and artworks from the past, but also includes modern works, and the living room is oriented more to the future.

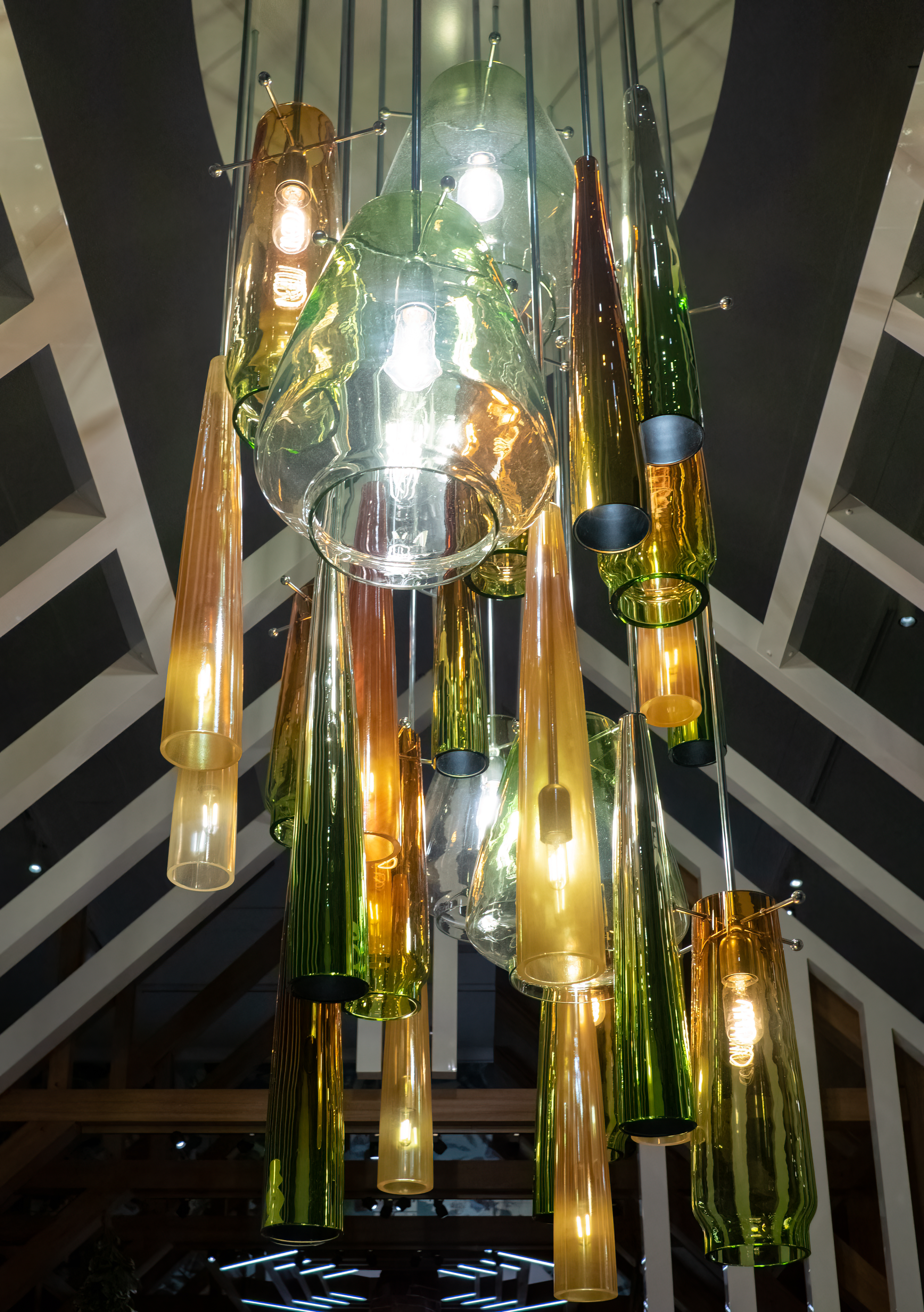
Vernus 3 by Ini Archibong in Before Yesterday We Could Fly

The exhibit was curated by Oscar-winning production designer Hannah Beachler, with Met curators Ian Alteveer of the Modern and Contemporary Art Department and Sarah Lawrence of the Department of European Sculpture and Decorative Arts. Michelle D. Commander, associate director and curator of the Lapidus Center for the Historical Analysis of Transatlantic Slavery at the Schomburg Center for Research in Black Culture, was consulting director and literary scholar. The name of the exhibition, Before Yesterday We Could Fly, is from the 19th-century legend of the flying Africans who were able to resist enslavement by flying home. Specifically, it is based on the story as told by Virginia Hamilton in her book The People Could Fly. Migan wrote that a common thread among the contemporary works in the exhibit has to do with answering a "call of Pan-Africanist diasporic longing" that Commander's scholarship calls for. Beachler told Gothamist that although the exhibit deals with tragedy, she wanted visitors to first see "pride and joy ... and then explore deeper". It opened on November 5, 2021, and is scheduled to run for at least two years. It is the first of several exhibitions the Met is planning on the subjects of race and social justice.

== Art and artists ==
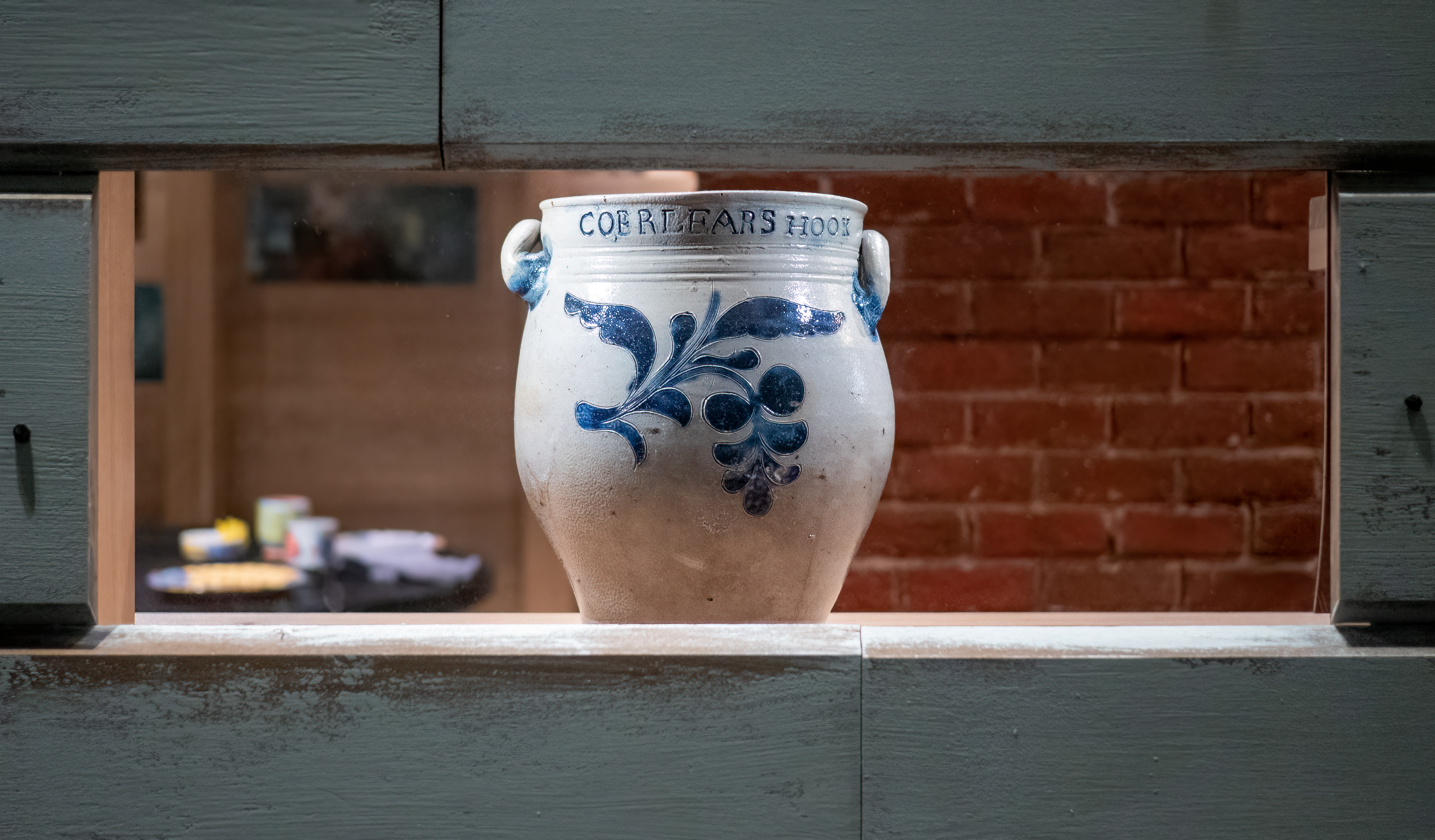
Stoneware jar (c. 1797–1819) by Thomas Commeraw, a free Black potter. It bears the mark of his Corlears Hook studio in Lower Manhattan.

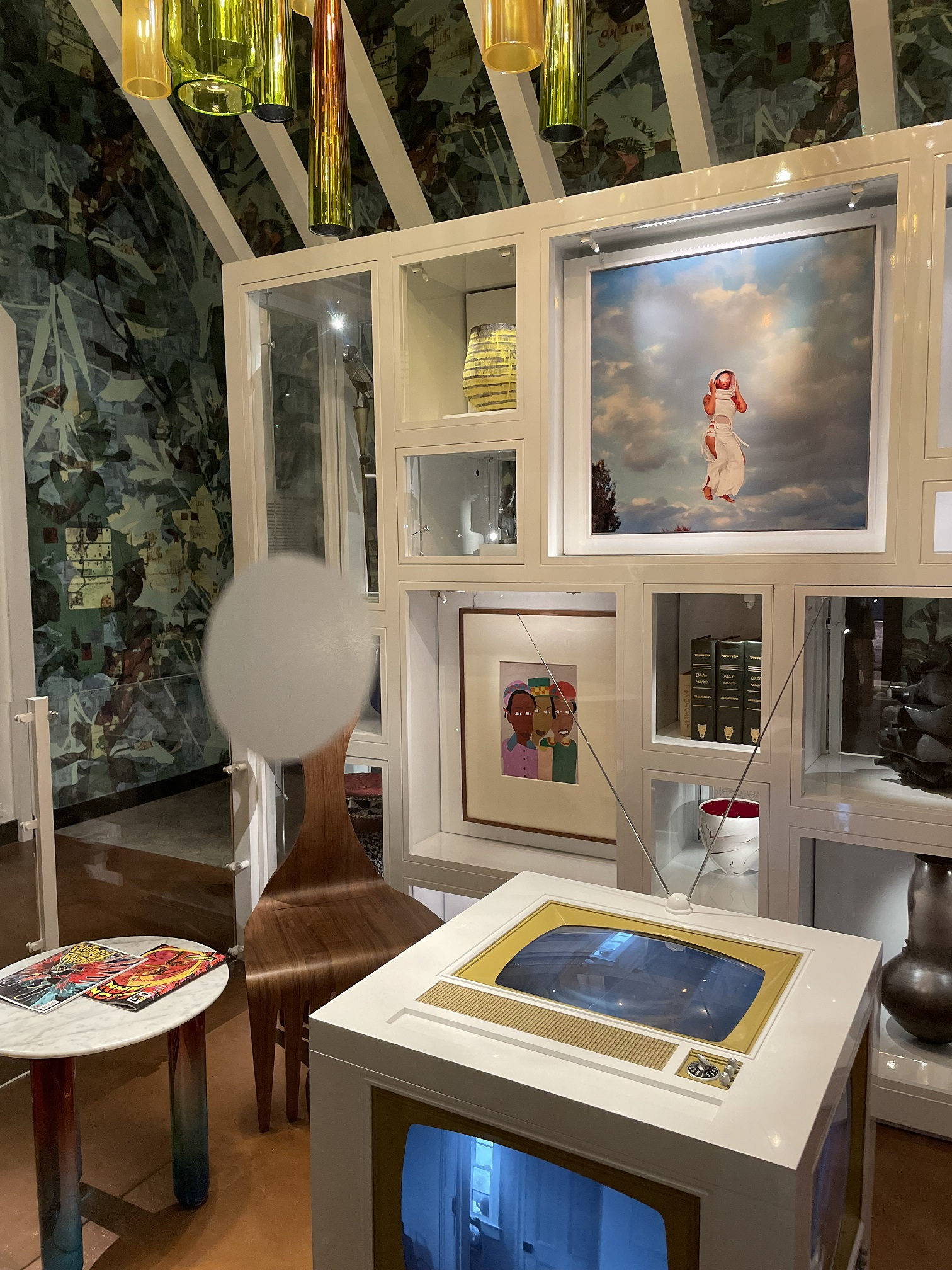
Another view of the exhibit (through display glass)

The exhibit uses the Met's existing collections from as early as the 17th century, new acquisitions from artists like Ini Archibong, Yinka Ilori, Cyrus Kabiru, Roberto Lugo, Zizipho Poswa, Atang Tshikare, and Tourmaline, and three commissioned works by Njideka Akunyili Crosby, Fabiola Jean-Louis, and Jenn Nkiru. Some of the functional objects from the Met's collection were selected to evoke artifacts unearthed during Columbia University's 2011 Seneca Village Project, including a number of glass pieces; some of the newer works also fit into this theme. Overall, there are 74 artworks cataloged in the exhibition, not counting the architectural elements or the numerous books.

Multiple reviewers highlighted inkjet-printed vinyl wallpaper titled "Thriving and Potential, Displaced (Again and Again and…)" by Njideka Akunyili Crosby and a five-sided console television, recalling the network news era, designed by curator Hannah Beachler with a film by Jenn Nkiru titled "OUT/ SIDE OF TIME" shot on location in Weeksville, Brooklyn. For Salamishah Tillet of The New York Times, a dress made of paper, clay, gold, crystals, and resin, called "Justice of Ezili" by Jean-Louis Fabiola, best captures the combinations of times and objects in the exhibit. Hyperallergic's Valentina Di Liscia said Jomo Tariku's "Mido Chair" was "one of the most striking contemporary pieces on display". It is seen as resonating with a 19th vulcanite rubber comb also on display, a "[product] of a colonial economy that exploited Indigenous labor [with a] decorative border in the shape of a link chain [that] recalls the danger of capture and bondage faced by freed Black individuals following the passage of the Fugitive Slave Act in 1850", which itself was chosen to evoke a gutta-percha comb excavated in 2011. Other artists in the exhibit include Willie Cole, Elizabeth Catlett, and Lorna Simpson.

While the exhibition shapes the narratives of black artists and creatives, Roberto Lugo created a vase called Digable Underground, which portrays Harriet Tubman and Erykah Badu on either side, surrounded by images of gold roses, black, gold and red Pan-African colors and graffiti, an homage to cumulative symbols of blackness. The queer artist Tourmaline continues this transcendence of the past in a 2020 self-portrait titled Morning Cloak that builds on this transcendence of who and what should be centered not only in the context of portraiture but the significance of black portraiture.

Ini Archibong's Vernus 3 is a piece in the Before Yesterday We Could Fly: An Afrofuturist Period Room inspired by the glass artifacts found in the excavation of 2011. The piece, made from glass and galvanized steel, is a futuristic chandelier structure with hues of orange and yellow. Vernus 3 can be seen in the futuristic side of the house, the living room, bringing a warmth to the space. More of Archibong's work can be seen throughout speculative side of the room. A pair of Atlas Chairs upholstered with an African inspired fabric accompany the marble and glass Orion Table. Both pieces showcase bright colors and make up the lounge area in the living room.

== Reception ==
In addition to praise for individual artworks like those of Crosby, Nkiru, and Fabiola, the exhibit has received largely positive reviews. Salamishah Tillet called the rooms "breathtaking" and wrote that one of the most salient characteristics of the exhibit is its "ornateness [which] underscores the toll of the city's loss, and the consequences of denying Black people the ability to pass on their wealth across generations". Tillet praised the use of a "traditional period room, a genre that is increasingly scrutinized by critics for its whitewashing of history", changing it from something that claims to be an accurate portrayal of the past to something that "[embraces] how the racial contradictions of New York City's history and the utopian aspirations of Seneca Village continue to shape our country today". Gothamist's Jennifer Vanasco called the exhibit "a finely-detailed marvel" and "a sparkling wonder, with surprising objects everywhere one looks". Met Costume Institute Fellow Jonathan Square told Hyperallergic that while he loved the idea, he would have preferred a better use of space than a "structure within a structure" which felt "a bit cluttered, and feels a little ramshackled". Darla Migan wrote in Artnet that although it feels "cramped" relative to similar rooms in the museum, it "works considering that the intention behind this project is also far less grandiose" than traditional period rooms.
