= Michelle D. Commander =

Author and Historian

- Education: PhD, University of Southern California
- Occupations: Author and Historian
- Awards: Fulbright scholar
- Website: www.michelle-commander.com

Michelle D. Commander is a historian and author, and the Deputy Director of the Smithsonian’s National Museum of African American History and Culture (NMAAHC).

== Education ==
Commander received her BA in English from Charleston Southern University and completed a M.S. in Curriculum and Instruction at Florida State University before completing a MA and PhD in American Studies and Ethnicity at the University of Southern California.

== Career ==
Commander worked as associate professor of English and Africana Studies at the University of Tennessee for eight years. She has also taught courses at Florida A&M University, Florida State University and the University of Ghana. She serves as faculty for Rare Book School, and is an author at Ms. Magazine. Following her professorship, Commander first became associate director and curator of the Lapidus Center for the Historical Analysis of Transatlantic Slavery at the Schomburg Center for Research in Black Culture and then became the Schomberg's Deputy Director of Research and Strategic Initiatives, until December 2022. Commander also served as consulting curator and literary scholar for the Metropolitan Museum of Art's Afrofuturism period room, Before Yesterday We Could Fly, which opened in November 2021.

She started her current position, Deputy Director of the Smithsonian’s National Museum of African American History and Culture (NMAAHC), in January 2023.

== Scholarship ==
Commander's work focuses on slavery and memory, diaspora studies, literary studies, Afrofuturism, and Black social movements. Her publications include Afro-Atlantic Flight: Speculative Returns and the Black Fantastic (Duke University Press 2017), and Avidly Reads Passages (NYU Press 2021). She is editor of Unsung: Unheralded Narratives of American Slavery & Abolition, an anthology of Black history spanning transatlantic slavery to Reconstruction. Her focus on Black mobility, slavery, diasporic longing and speculative futures is evident in her influence on Before Yesterday We Could Fly at the Metropolitan Museum of Art.

== Awards ==
Commander is a Ford Foundation scholar and is the recipient of a Fulbright grant which funded teaching and research in Ghana in 2012-2013.
