= Roberto Lugo =

American artist, poet, educator (born 1981)

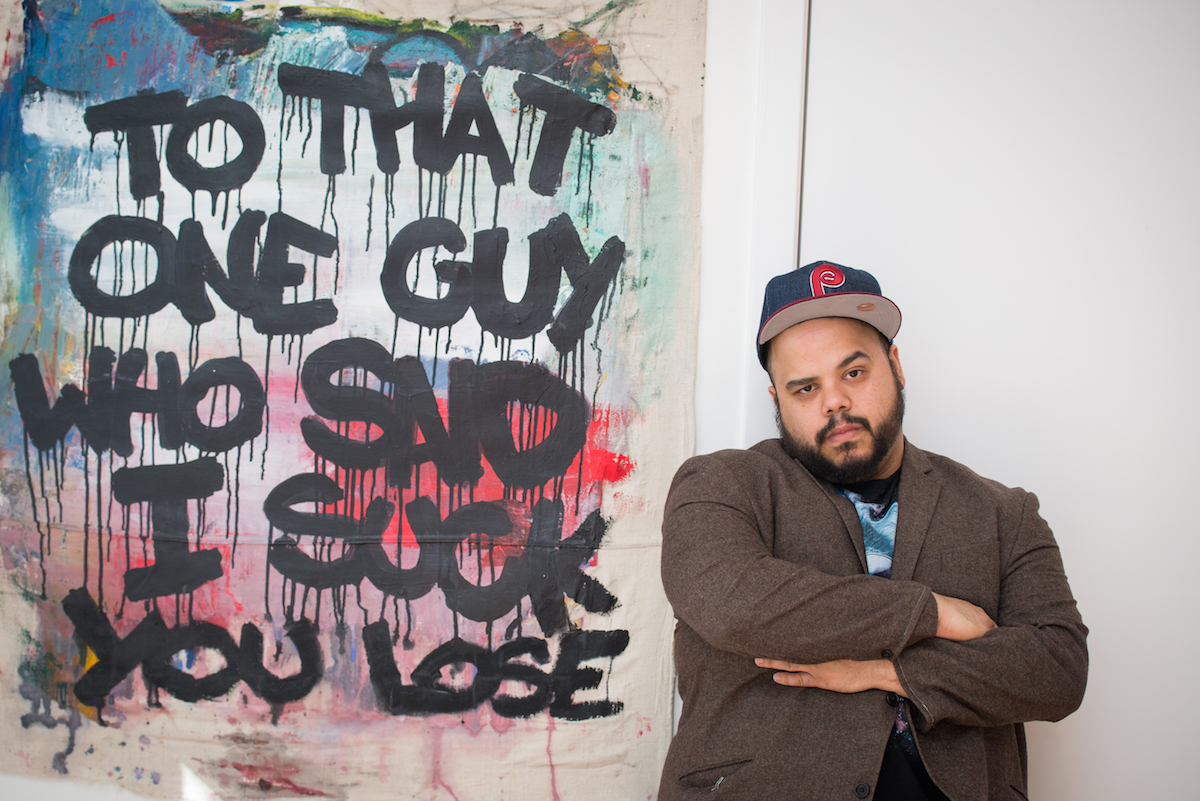
- Born: 1981 (age 44–45); Kensington, Philadelphia, Pennsylvania, U.S.
- Education: Kansas City Art Institute (BFA), Pennsylvania State University (MFA)
- Occupations: potter, poet, educator
- Website: robertolugostudio.com

Roberto Lugo (born 1981) is an American potter, social activist, spoken-word poet, and educator.

Lugo's work as a social activist is represented in his artworks, where he draws together hip-hop, history, politics and his cultural background into formal ceramics and 2D works.

Born in the Kensington neighborhood of Philadelphia, to Puerto Rican parents, Lugo began his career as a graffiti artist and teacher before discovering ceramics.

Lugo holds a Bachelor of Fine Arts degree from the Kansas City Art Institute and an Master of Fine Arts degree from Pennsylvania State University, and was a professor of ceramics at the Tyler School of Art. Lugo was an assistant professor of art at the Tyler School of Art and is the recipient of the 2019 Rome Prize. His unique works have earned nationwide attention and numerous shows.

== Early life ==
Lugo was born in the Kensington neighborhood of Philadelphia in 1981, the third child in his family who moved to the U.S. mainland from Puerto Rico. His mother, Maribel Lugo, was 21 years old and his father Gilberto, a Pentecostal preacher, had a middle-school education, as he had been working sugar-cane fields in Puerto Rico since he was a child. Raised during a time in Philadelphia that saw prevalent drug use and gang activity, with many of the neighborhood houses abandoned due to the late-20th-century crack epidemic, things were not easy for the Lugo family.

Seeking better work opportunities, his father often biked to work in Cherry Hill, New Jersey, an act Lugo associates with his current work: "When I sit at a potter's wheel, I often think of my father's bike tire spinning, and this metaphor has always had me reach for more." His mother worked two to three part-time jobs to help support the family while also caring for the three children.

While his parents worked hard yet remained struggling, marginalized on the outskirts of American culture, Lugo was a quiet child, devoutly religious, with a thick Spanish accent and had trouble reading. Teachers failed to recognize his creative talents and even singled him out as a troublemaker in a school trip to a local prison.

As a teenager, he liked grunge rock and ice hockey, in addition to the salsa, rap, and baseball favored by neighborhood kids, who pointed to him as "weird" or "trying to be white". He did not have access to art in school, and partly to better fit in, he took up writing graffiti with cousins on the streets of Philadelphia. He signed his work with the tag "Robske", which he continues to use on all his work and credits with his artistic career; "I couldn’t make the pottery I make today if I hadn’t started doing graffiti as a teen."

Lugo worked various factory jobs in Philadelphia, until at age 22 he moved to South Florida to live with family and decide what to do with his life. He saw college as a way to earn a decent living, which is when he enrolled in a ceramics class at a community college. Told that "real, honest" art came from personal experience, he made pieces like a fire hydrant that evoked happy memories of showering in the street with his father on nights when the family's water had been turned off. "It was the first time in my life I was ever told I was good at anything," he says of those early efforts, adding that artmaking immediately became his calling: "Right off the bat, it felt important."

== Education ==
In 2007, he briefly attended the School of the Art Institute of Chicago before being accepted to the ceramics-arts program at the Kansas City Art Institute, where he would graduate with a BFA in 2012. He began devouring ceramics history as well as anthropology, intrigued by how pots tell stories about past cultures. In historical ceramics, he found connections to his own work, such as how the lines of a leaf or flower on a Chinese pot looked like graffiti arrows, and had the same quick, gestural quality as tagging. By drawing graffiti on his surfaces with china paint, he could put his own stamp on ceramics history and discourse. He also realized that minorities and people of color were underrepresented in the field, and that, through his work, "I had the opportunity to speak on behalf of people where I come from."

That sense of mission intensified when he entered graduate school at Pennsylvania State University School of Visual Arts in 2012, around the same time that his brother was, Lugo says, unjustly convicted of a drug-related charge and sent to prison. Feeling sorrow and anger, and even guilt for his own situation, he created Oppression, a work he considers one of his best. The heads of two men of color – Lugo and his brother – sit in subjugation on a Victorian teacart, essentially serving as saucers for dripping cups. (His brother was eventually granted early release, has rebuilt his life, and is "doing really well," Lugo says.)

In 2013, he explored the theme of incarceration more directly, when photographer Richard Ross invited him to collaborate on Juvenile in Justice, a show in Philadelphia about imprisoned youth. Ross, whose work is photographing incarcerated youth, had come to Penn State to critique students in the photography department. Lugo put pots in his backpack and waited outside the critique room for Ross. The invitation to collaborate followed. Coming on the heels of an artist residency he did in Hungary through the Kansas City Art Institute, the show marked a turning point in Lugo's career. "I felt that I was empowered to do anything, and that my voice was an important and needed component to the ceramics community."

== NCECA 2015 ==
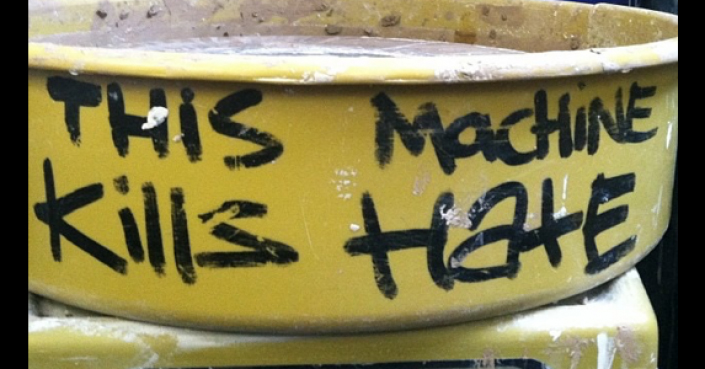
This Machine Kills Hate from 2015 NCECA conference Emerging Artists Presentation

In late 2014, having recently graduated with his MFA from Penn State, Lugo received word he had been selected as an Emerging Artist for the National Council on Education in Ceramic Arts 2015 conference, to be held in Providence, Rhode Island. Lugo's deeply personal lecture, part spoken-word performance, part sermon, electrified the crowd of nearly 5,000 attendees. His speech about how pottery saved his life, including the image of the phrase "This machine kills hate" painted onto his pottery wheel earned him an enthusiastic standing ovation. "I want to take Roberto Lugo out of the equation for a moment, the individual. I am proud to be a part of a community of people that honors the things I just talked about, that finds those things valuable… We’re a culture that can change the world." The video of that lecture has nearly 20,000 views online, and Lugo has received more than 100 emails from people who saw the speech in person or online, thanking him and sharing similar experiences.

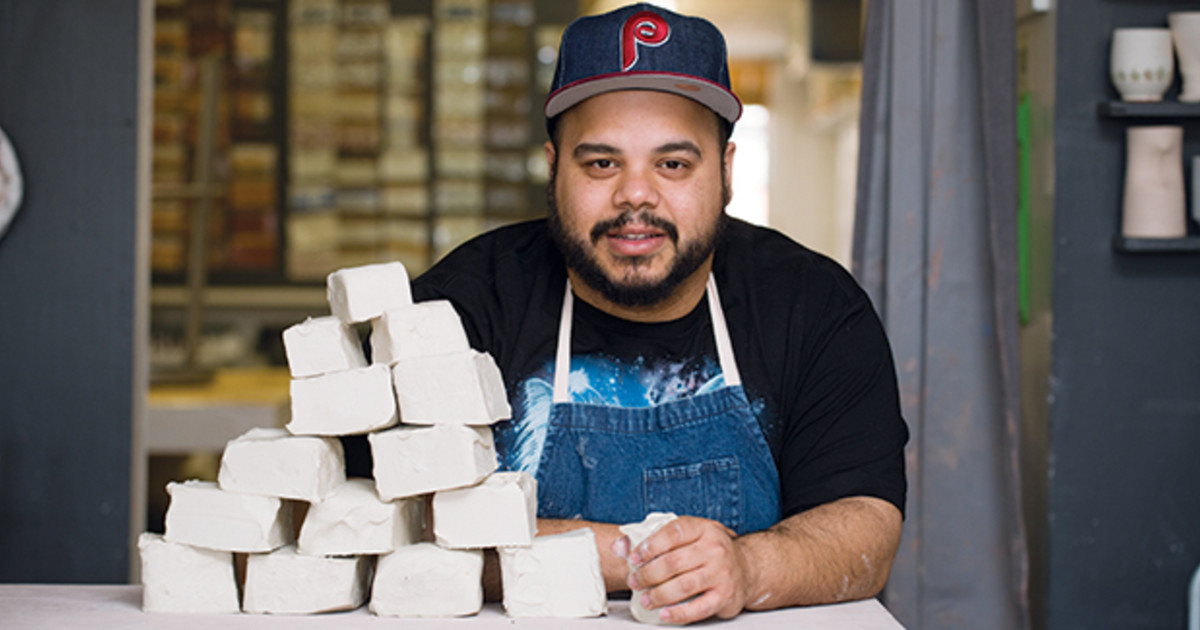
Roberto Lugo at the Philadelphia Clay Studio

== 2015 – present ==
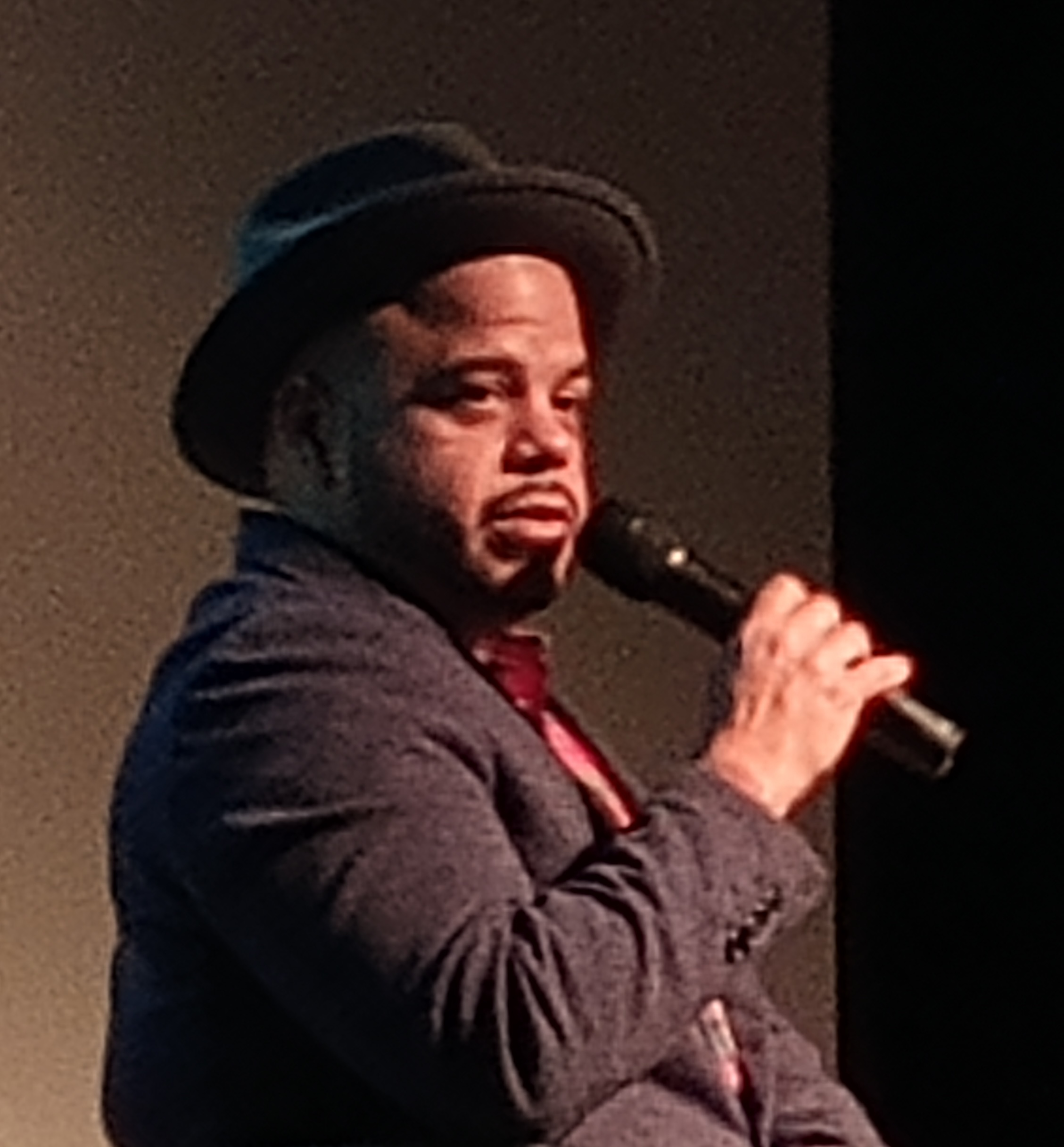
Roberto Lugo at Craftnow 2025

After NCECA, Lugo was contacted by a gallery in his hometown, only four miles from the ghettos of Kensington. Wexler Gallery in Old City now represents Lugo, and recently exhibited their first solo show with together in June 2016, titled Defacing Adversity: The Life and Times of Roberto Lugo. Like all of Lugo's work, Defacing Adversity tackles issue of social justice, politics, race and poverty through the vehicle of highly decorated historically themed ceramic forms. By combining graffiti, hip hop, history, pop culture and porcelain, Lugo is bringing new conversations to the table of contemporary art, supported by Wexler, a gallery that challenges the labels of traditional art. In 2021, Lugo's ceramic Digable Underground was featured at the Metropolitan Museum of Art. Digable Underground featured Harriet Tubman and Erykah Badu reflecting on how the kitchen works to bring them together.

Outside of creating work for solo shows, Lugo has been very busy since his NCECA lecture. He has completed several short-term residencies, one at The Clay Studio in Philadelphia and another at Baltimore Clayworks, giving lectures around the country to emerging ceramic artists and schools, and serving as a visiting artist in various locations.

In 2015, he began teaching at Marlboro College in southern Vermont, where his is on the tenure track. "I wanted to be in a place where I can see progress can be made, in a place that doesn’t have diversity— but really does have the desire to become more racially diverse," he explained. He has been featured at multiple exhibitions, including SOFA Chicago and a solo show at Eutectic Gallery in Portland, Oregon.

Lugo also remains active in social justice in other forums. He maintains a series of video diaries on social media, speaking out on issues of race relations in the U.S., diversity in the field, and inspiring future generations of artists to dare to be the voices of change. He has also contributed to social change organizations such as The Democratic Cup. Lugo is an assistant professor of art at Tyler School of Art.

== Film ==
The film Without Wax was set to release in the fall of 2019, directed by Cyrus Duff and produced by Edward Columbia. About this film, IMDb shares "Past and present intertwine in this boundary-pushing cinematic documentary about world-renowned ceramics artist Roberto Lugo."

== Art ==
Lugo's work has been compared to Kehinde Wiley's portraits of young people of color in heroic poses, often based on famous historical paintings, and Lin-Manuel Miranda's Hamilton's use of hip-hop wigs and waistcoats treatment of the American Revolution. His forms often reflect historical ceramic patterns, in particular he is drawn to the Royal Worcester porcelain. Juxtaposed with traditionally precious porcelain, the imagery of poverty, social and racial injustice are illuminated. Lugo's vessels are multicultural mash-ups, traditional European and Asian porcelain forms reimagined with a 21st-century street sensibility. Their handpainted surfaces feature classic decorative patterns and motifs, the kind found on bandanas, combined with elements of modern urban graffiti, plus striking portraits of individuals you might not expect to find on a type of ornate luxury item historically made for the rich – people like Sojourner Truth, Cornel West, and Erykah Badu, as well as Lugo's family members and, very often, the artist himself. Faces framed by colorful patterns are prominent, often in direct contrast, such as a confederate flag surrounding the faces of victims of racial discrimination. Lugo's work does not pull any punches, and delivers hard messages with delicate brushstrokes.

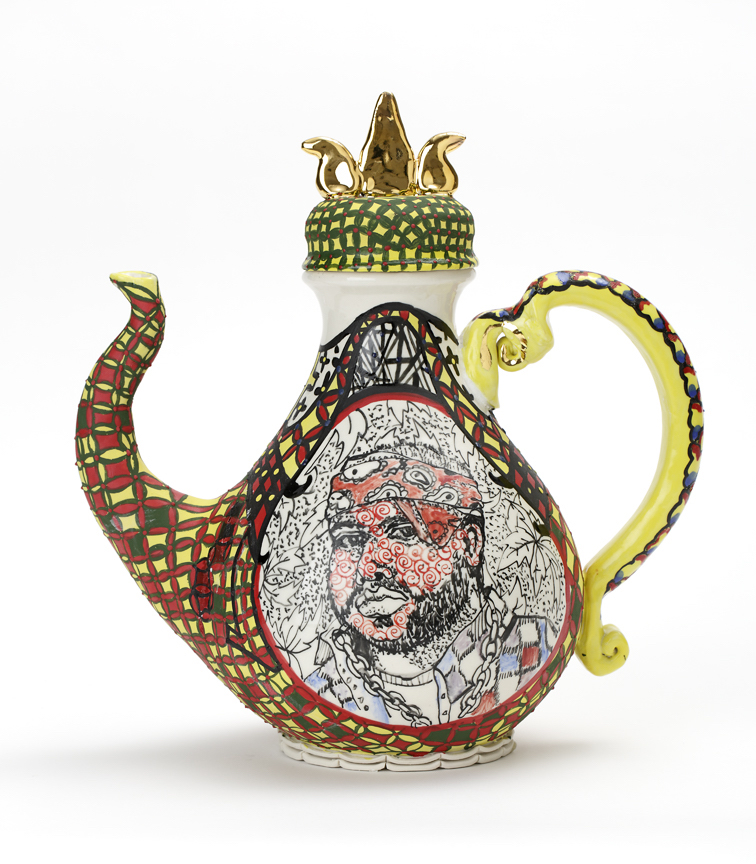
Teapot: Self Portrait, 2015

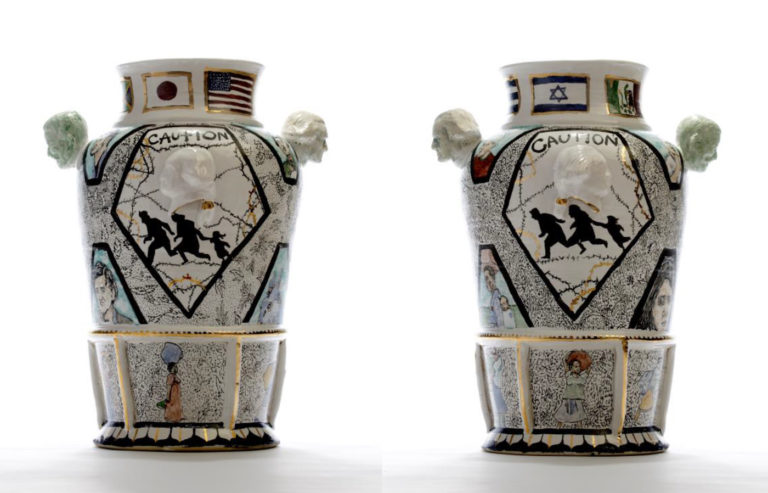
Century Vase III: American, 2015

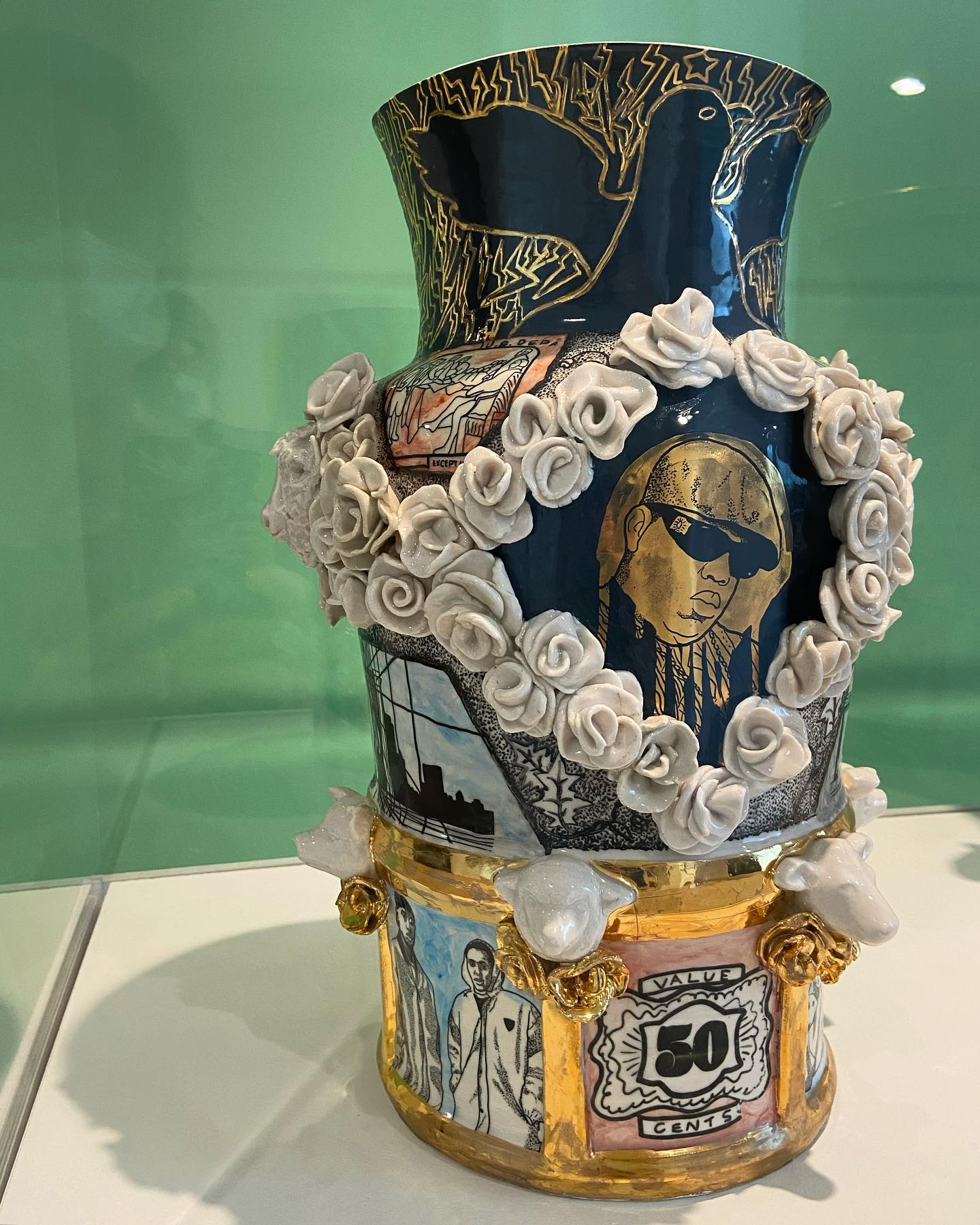

== Exhibitions ==
Lugo's work is included in the Afrofuturist Period Room exhibition Before Yesterday We Could Fly at the Metropolitan Museum of Art.

== Family ==
Roberto has two sons and lives and works in Elkins Park, Pennsylvania.
