= Richard Hutten =

Dutch designer

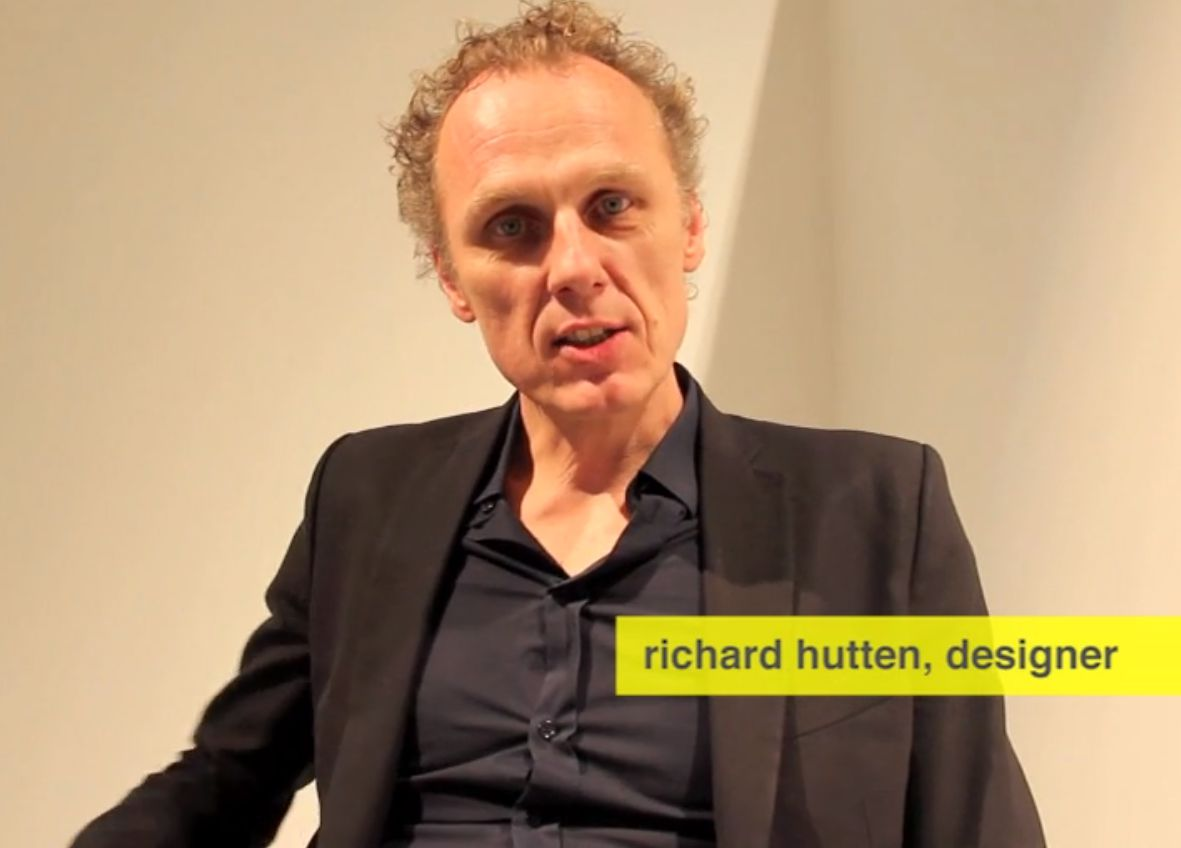
- Hutten in 2015
- Born: 30 March 1967; Zwollerkerspel, Netherlands
- Education: Design Academy Eindhoven
- Occupation: Designer
- Known for: Droog collaborations
- Awards: Dutch Furniture Award, 1996
- Website: richardhutten.com

Richard G. J. Hutten (born 30 March 1967, in Zwollerkerspel) is a Dutch industrial designer, art director, and artist who is active in furniture design, product design, interior design, and exhibition design.

== Biography ==
Hutten graduating from the Design Academy Eindhoven in 1991 and started his own design studio in Rotterdam after the same year.

Hutten has been involved with Droog Design ('Dry Design') since its inception in 1993 and has been a prominent exponent ever since.

Hutten is known for what he refers to as "No sign of design" furniture: functional furniture in a conceptual and humorous style. Hutten's "Table upon table" concept an example of this style.

He designed the seating for Schiphol Airport in Amsterdam using circular economy principles, so that all materials are either recycled, recyclable or biodegradable.

== Work ==
=== Exhibitions ===
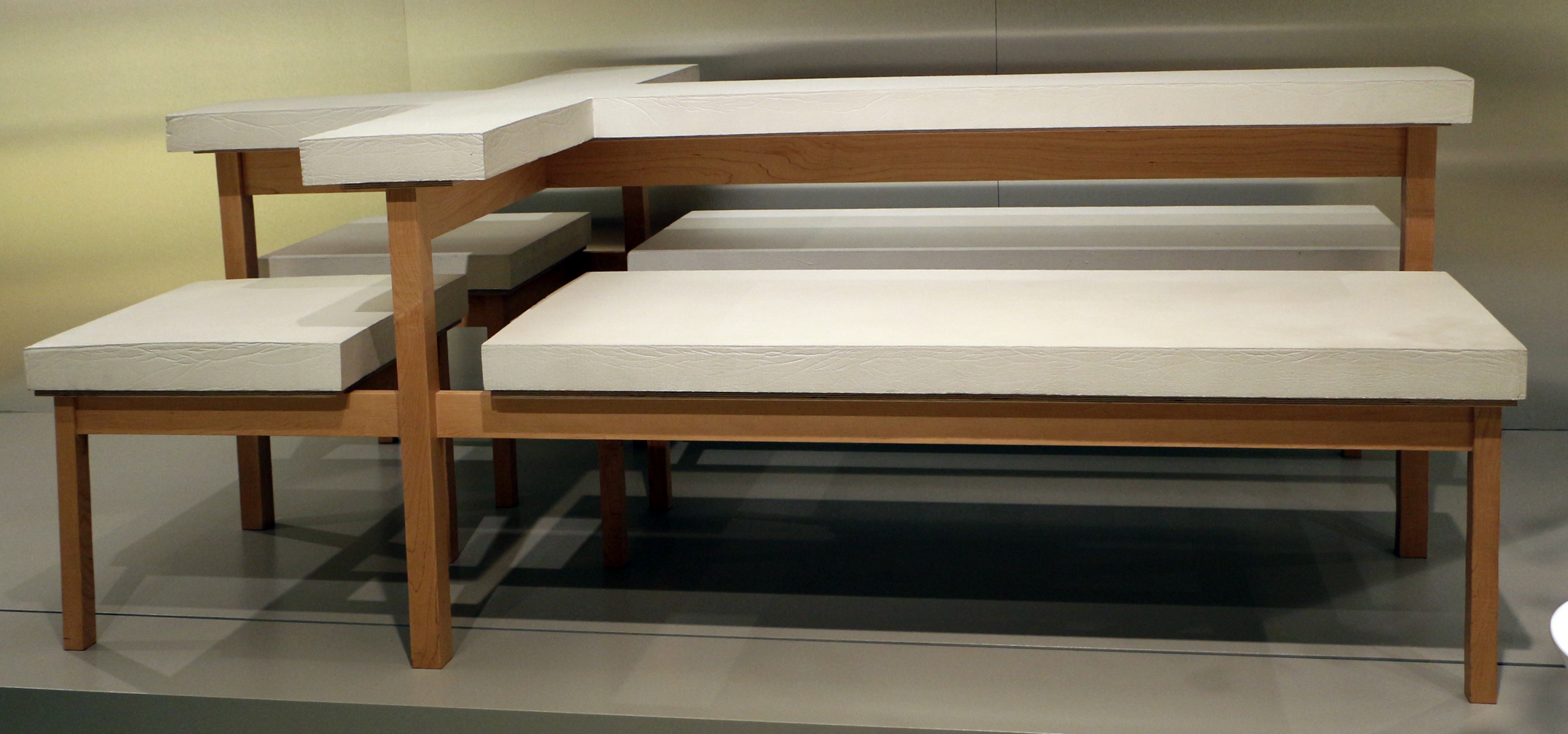
Cross table and benches 1994

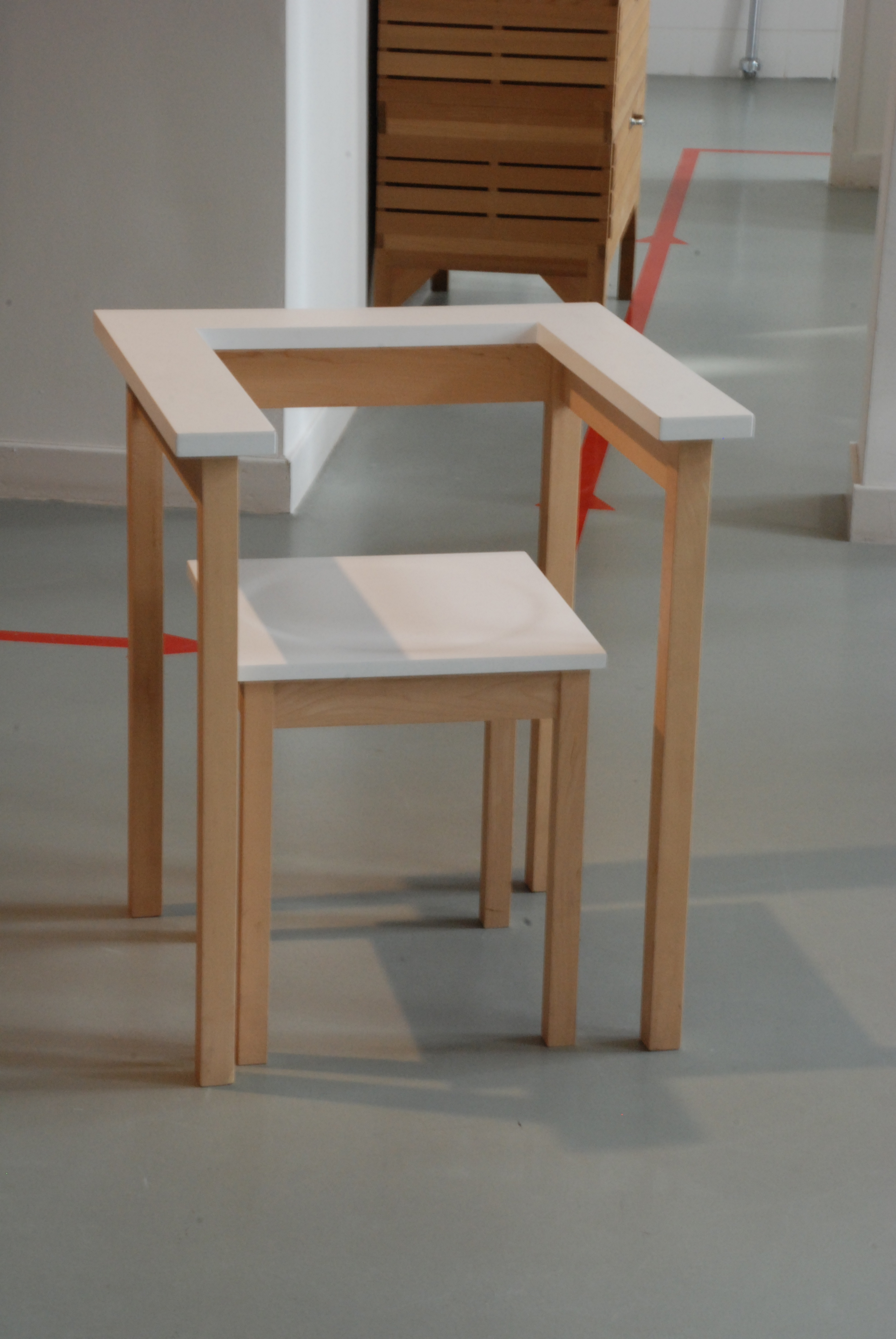
Chair (2007)

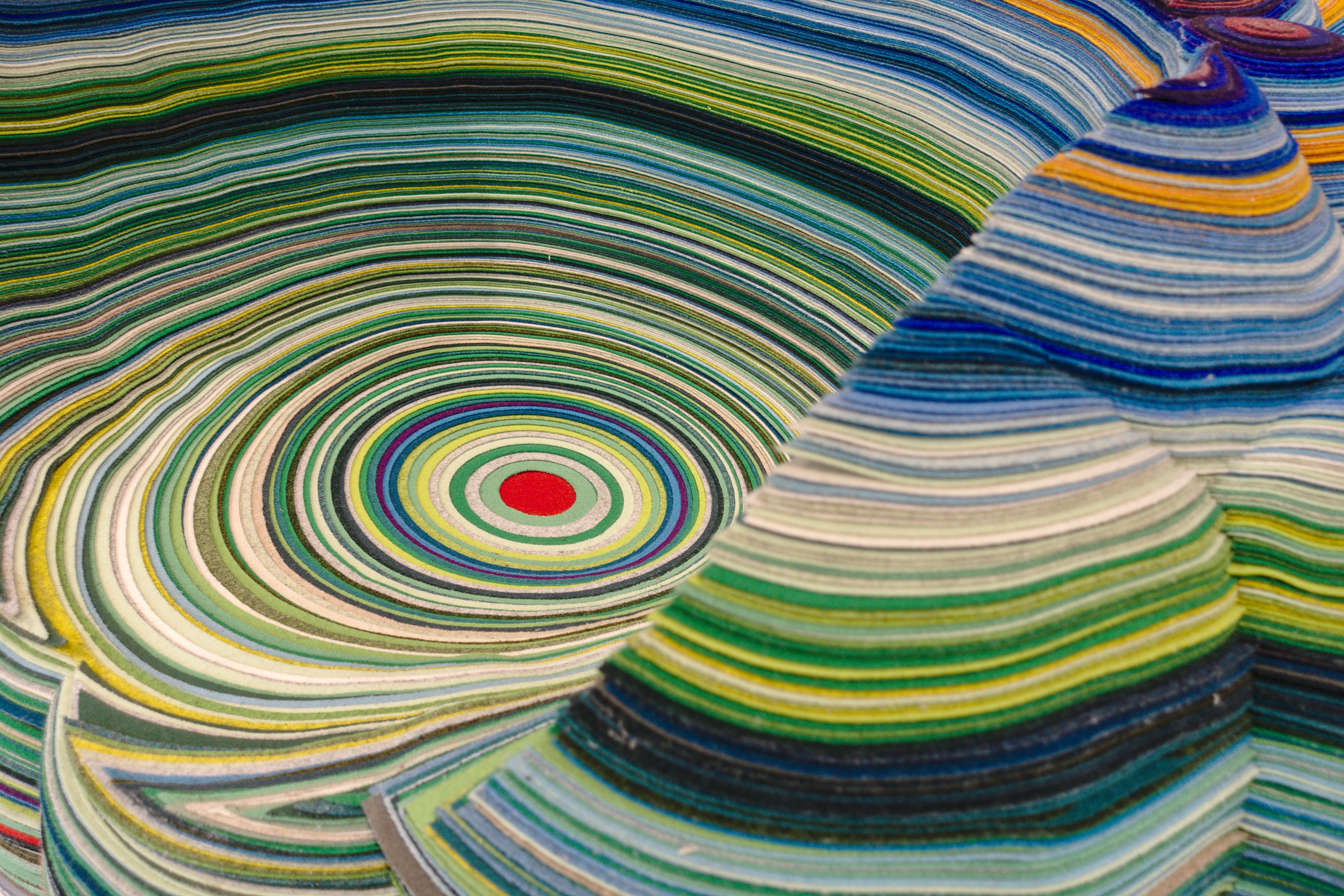
Cloud Layers chair made of layered cloth (2013) Gemeentemuseum Den Haag

The work of Hutten has also been exhibited in the Netherlands from Rotterdam (Kunsthal and Museum Boijmans van Beuningen), Amsterdam (Stedelijk Museum), Utrecht (Centraal Museum), Den Bosch (Museum het Kruithuis) to Breda (Museum De Beyerd),

In Europe there have been presentations, such as in Ghent, Belgium, in Germany in Berlin, Bremen (Ubersee Museum), Cologne, Stuttgart (Design Centre) and Weimar and further on in London, Paris, Milan, Verona (Abitare il Tempo), Copenhagen (Louisiana Museum), and Helsinki (Industry Museum & Alvar Aalto Museum).

Outside of Europe his work has been shown among other places in New York City (Museum of Modern Art), Montreal, Toronto, Tokyo (Idée, E&Y), Osaka, and San Francisco (Museum of Modern Art).

In 2016 his work was shown in the Dresden Kunstgewerbemuseum in an exhibition called Friends+Design. The show was curated by Tulga Beyerle and Maria Cristina Didero and featured works by designers including Philippe Malouin, Jerszy Seymour, Michael Young, and Bethan Laura Wood working together on specially commissioned pieces that "testify to the time, the affection and the trust that form the bond between ... very different people."

In 2021, the exhibition "Emphatic: Discovering a Glass Legacy" at Punta Conterie Gallery in Murano, Italy, included works by Hutten, as well as designers Ini Archibong, Noé Duchaufour-Lawrance, GamFratesi, Benjamin Hubert, Luca Nichetto, Elena Salmistraro, and Marc Thorpe.

In 2023, during the Milan design week, Hutten and the Maria Cristina Didero presented Droog30 – Design or Non-design, an exhibition about the Dutch design movement and its historical significance. On the occasion of the event, he said "I think Droog is the last movement in design. In the '80s, we had Memphis. In the '90s, we had Droog. And since then, there has not been any big movement in design, or in art or in architecture."

=== Collections ===
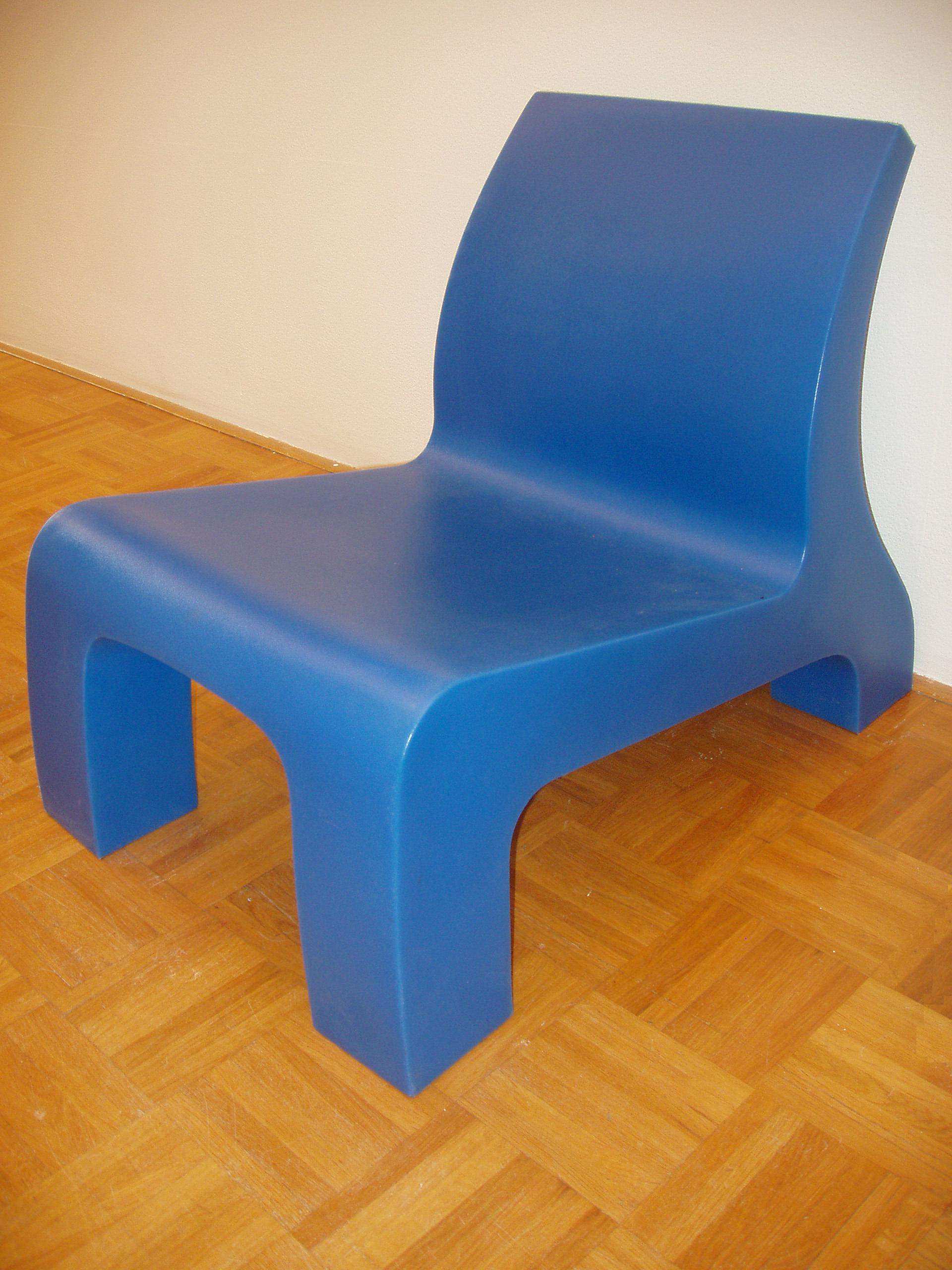
Richard Hutten: Chair 'Rhino'

Hutten's work is held in permanent museum collections in the Netherlands such as the Centraal Museum Utrecht, the Kunstmuseum Den Haag, Museum Boijmans Van Beuningen, and the Stedelijk Museum in Amsterdam. Other collections holding examples of his work include those of the Vitra Design Museum in Weil am Rhein, the San Francisco Museum of Modern Art, and the Museum of Modern Art (MoMA) in New York.

Philippe Starck used pieces designed by Hutten for the interiors of the Delano Hotel in Miami and the Mondrian Hotel Los Angeles.
