= Zwollerkerspel =

Former municipality in Overijssel, the Netherlands

Coordinates: 52.5086°N 6.0759°E

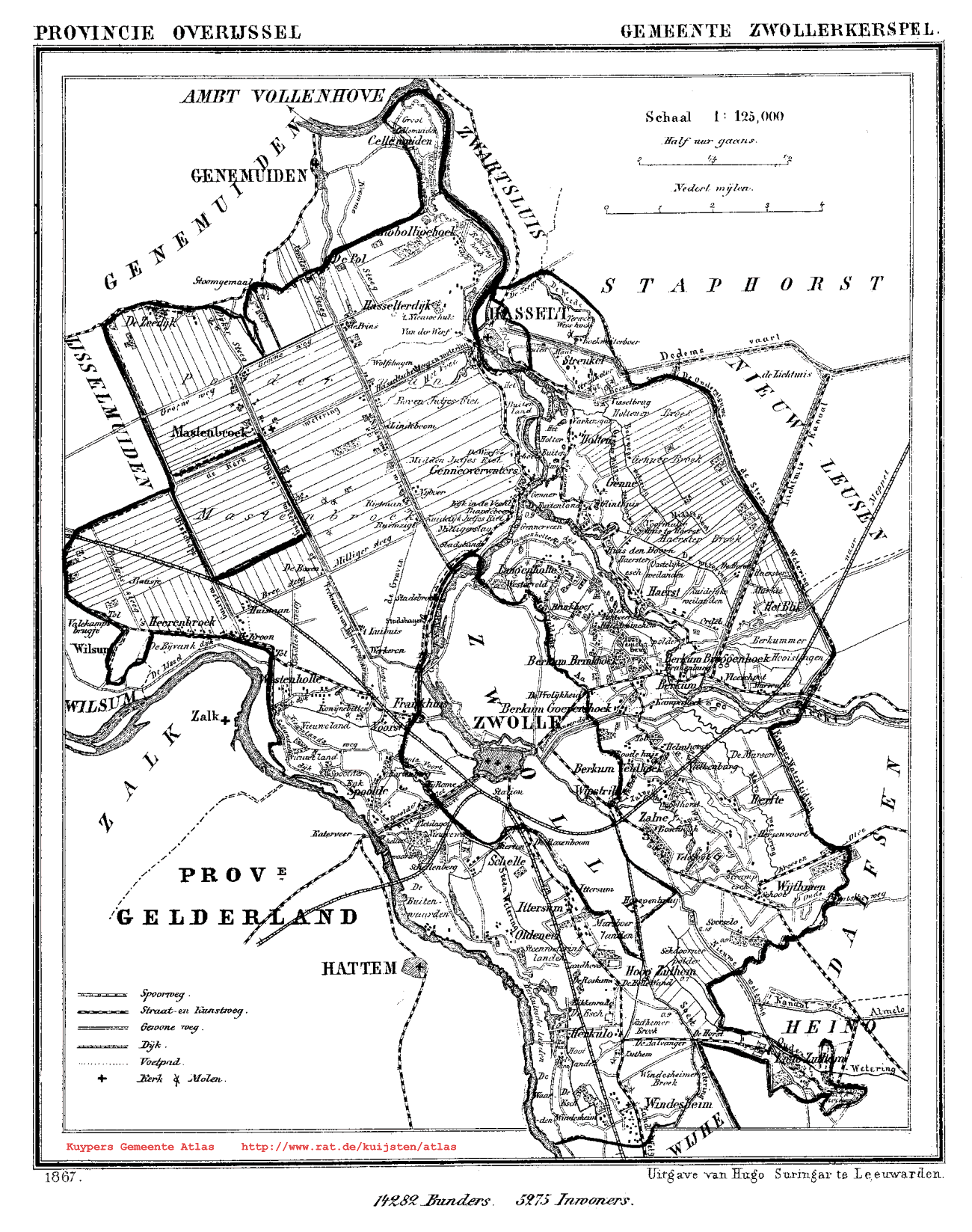
Map of Zwollerkerspel around Zwolle, 1867

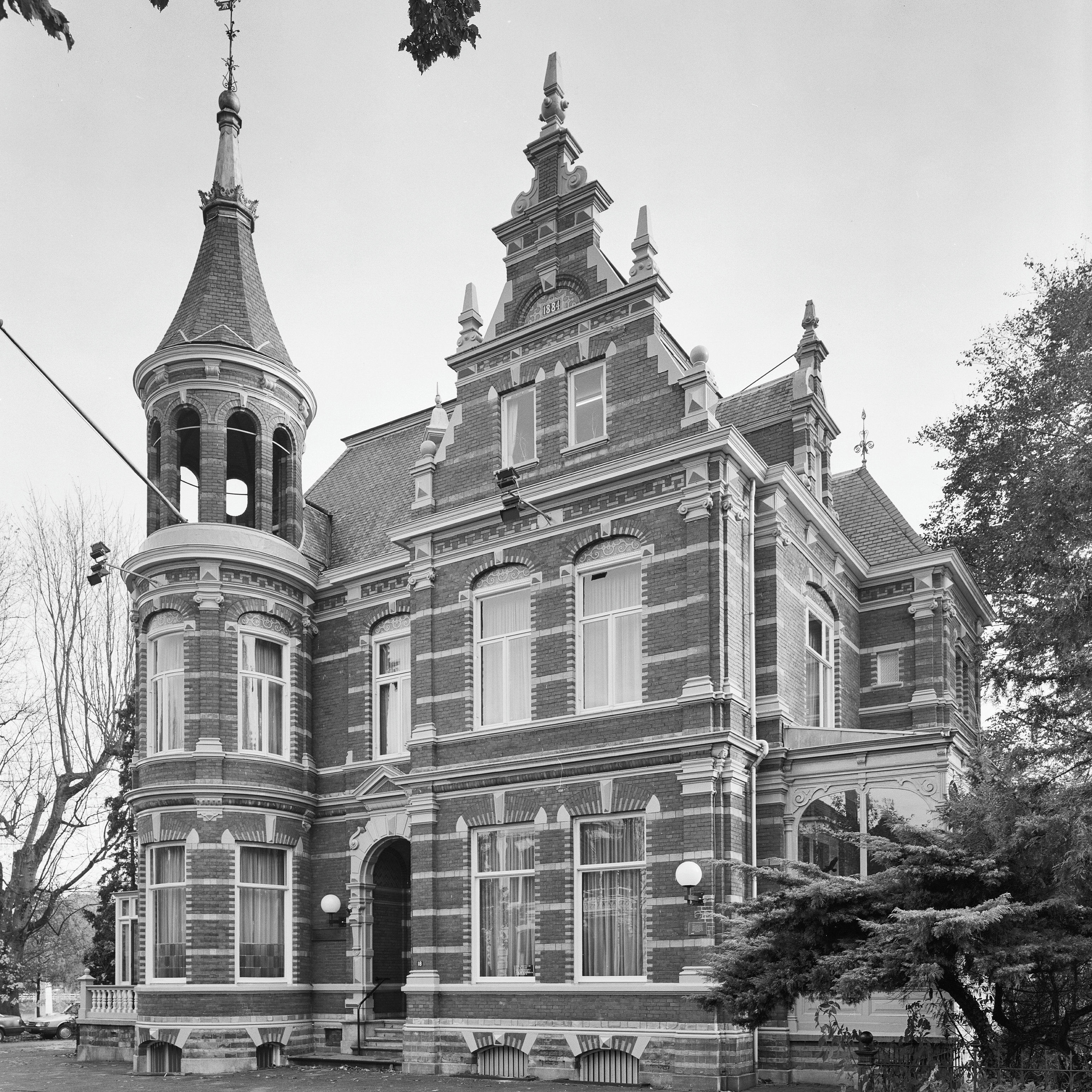
City hall (1916–1967) of the former municipality of Zwollerkerspel, in the nowadays Ter Pelkwijkpark of Zwolle

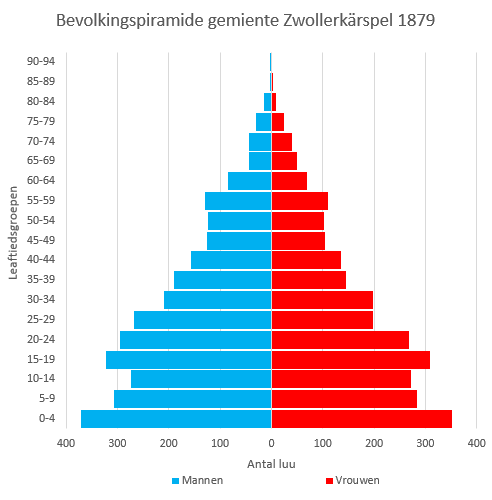
Population pyramid of the municipality on December 31, 1879

Zwollerkerspel (Low Saxon: Zwollerkärspel) is a former municipality in the province of Overijssel, Netherlands. It covered the countryside around the city of Zwolle. Zwollerkerspel was a separate municipality from 1802 until August 1, 1967, when it became a part of Zwolle, Hasselt, Heino, IJsselmuiden and Genemuiden.

== See also ==
- Richard Hutten
