= Jenn Nkiru =

Nigerian-British artist and director

- Born: Peckham
- Citizenship: United Kingdom, Nigeria
- Occupations: Filmmaker, Film director
- Website: https://www.jennnkiru.com/

Jenn Nkiru is a Nigerian-British artist and director. She is known for directing the music video for Beyoncé's "Brown Skin Girl" and for being the second unit director of Ricky Saiz’s video for Beyoncé and Jay-Z, "APESHIT" which was released in 2018. She was selected to participate in the 2019 Whitney Biennial.

== Early life ==
Nkiru was born in Peckham, South London. She studied law before moving to the United States, where she attended Howard University and graduated with a MFA in Filmmaking.

== Career ==
=== Short films ===
Her directorial debut was En Vogue, which was shot by Bradford Young and Arthur Jafa was released in 2014. In 2017, Nkiru created a film titled Celebrating Women In Art for the Tate Modern gallery that showcased female contemporary artists in celebration of International Women's Day. That same year, her second movie Rebirth is Necessary was released. This movie was featured on Nowness and won several awards including, the Canal+ Award at the Clermont Ferrand Film Festival and the Best Documentary at the London Independent Film Festival. Rebirth is Necessary was also nominated for the 2018 best short film award at Sheffield International Documentary Film Festival. Her video work is included in the Afrofuturist Period Room exhibition Before Yesterday We Could Fly at the Metropolitan Museum of Art.

=== Music videos ===
Nkiru has directed music videos for Beyoncé, Kamasi Washington and Neneh Cherry. She was the second unit director of Ricky Saiz’s video for Beyoncé and Jay-Z, "APESHIT" . In 2020 she directed the critically acclaimed music video for Beyoncé's "Brown Skin Girl", which won the Best Music Video award at the 2021 Grammy Awards.

== Works ==
- En Vogue
- Rebirth is Necessary
- Black to Techno
- "OUT/ SIDE OF TIME", commissioned for the Met exhibition Before Yesterday We Could Fly

== Awards ==
- 2018 - Voice of a Woman award at Cannes
- 2019 - Aesthetica Art Prize
- 2021- Grammy Award for Best Music Video for BROWN SKIN GIRL
