= Charleston Southern University =

Baptist university in North Charleston, South Carolina, U.S.

Coordinates: 32°58′51″N 80°4′16″W

- Former name: Baptist College of Charleston (1960–1990)
- Motto: Integrating Faith in Learning, Leading and Serving
- Type: Private
- Established: 1964; 62 years ago
- Accreditation: SACSCOC
- Religious affiliation: South Carolina Baptist Convention (Southern Baptist Convention)
- Academic affiliations: CIC
- Endowment: $29.8 million (2024)
- President: B. Keith Faulkner
- Faculty: 236 Full-time and 125 Part-time (Fall 2022)
- Administrative staff: 360
- Students: >4000 (Fall 2025)
- Postgraduates: 705 (Fall 2024)
- Location: North Charleston, South Carolina, United States
- Campus: Suburban, 300 acres (121 ha)
- Colors: Blue & gold
- Nickname: Buccaneers
- Sporting affiliations: NCAA Division I – Big South
- Mascot: Bucky
- Website: www.charlestonsouthern.edu

Charleston Southern University (CSU) is a private university in North Charleston, South Carolina, United States. It is affiliated with the South Carolina Baptist Convention (Southern Baptist Convention).

== History ==
Charleston Southern University was chartered in 1960 and became the Baptist College of Charleston, where it offered its first classes in the education building of the First Baptist Church of North Charleston.

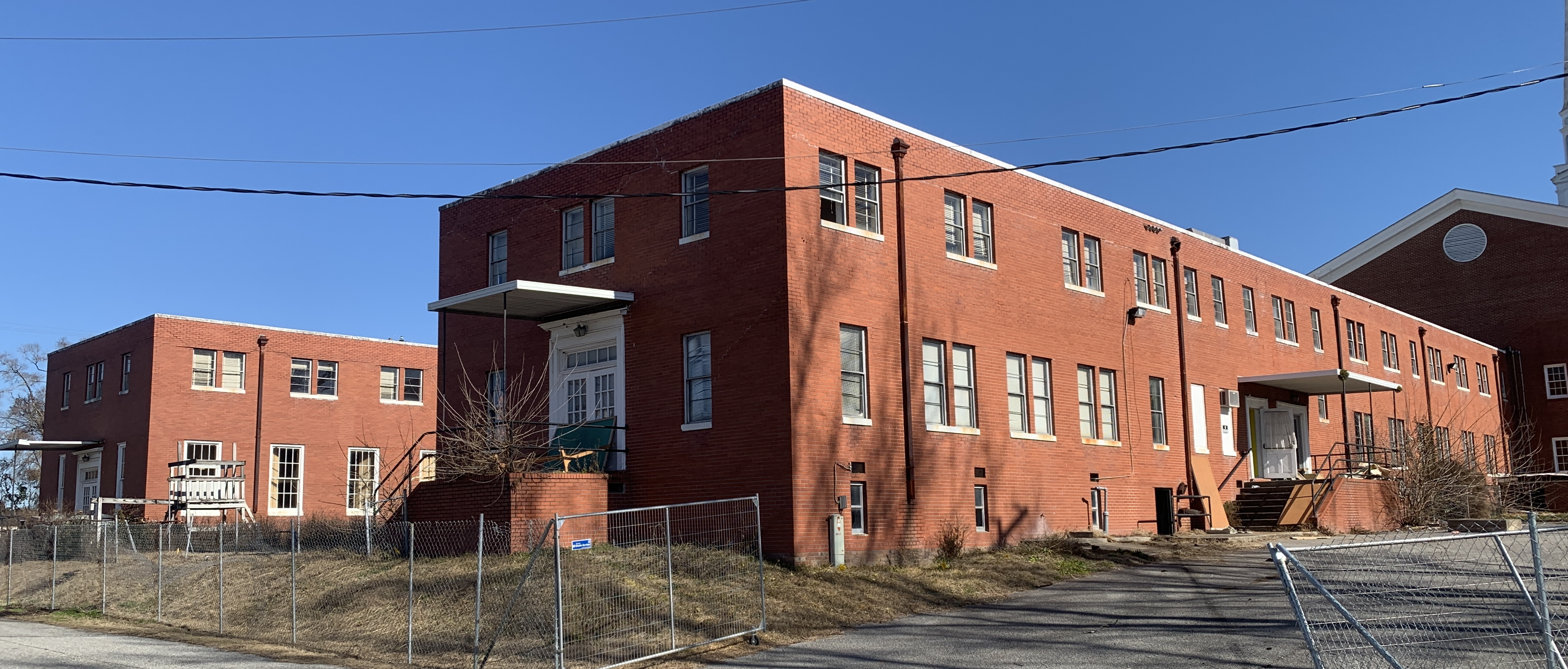
The school was started in the educational building at the First Baptist Church, 4217 Rivers Ave., North Charleston, South Carolina.

The university offered the first instruction at a post secondary level in 1965 and awarded its first degree in 1967. In 1990, the South Carolina Baptist Convention voted to change the university's name from Baptist College at Charleston to Charleston Southern University.

In 2001, the university was placed on a censure list issued by the American Association of University Professors.

== Academics ==
The university is accredited by the Commission on Colleges of the Southern Association of Colleges and Schools to award bachelor's and master's degrees. CSU students can choose from more than 50 undergraduate majors and graduate programs such as business, education, criminal justice, computer science, cyber security, Christian studies, graphic design, nursing, physical therapy, physician assistant, etc. Each degree program is combined with a comprehensive liberal arts foundation which is designed to develop problem-solving and communication skills.

== Accreditation ==
Charleston Southern University is accredited by the Southern Association of Colleges and Schools (SACSCOC) to award baccalaureate, master's, and doctorate degrees. It is affiliated with the South Carolina Baptist Convention (Southern Baptist Convention).

== Campus ==
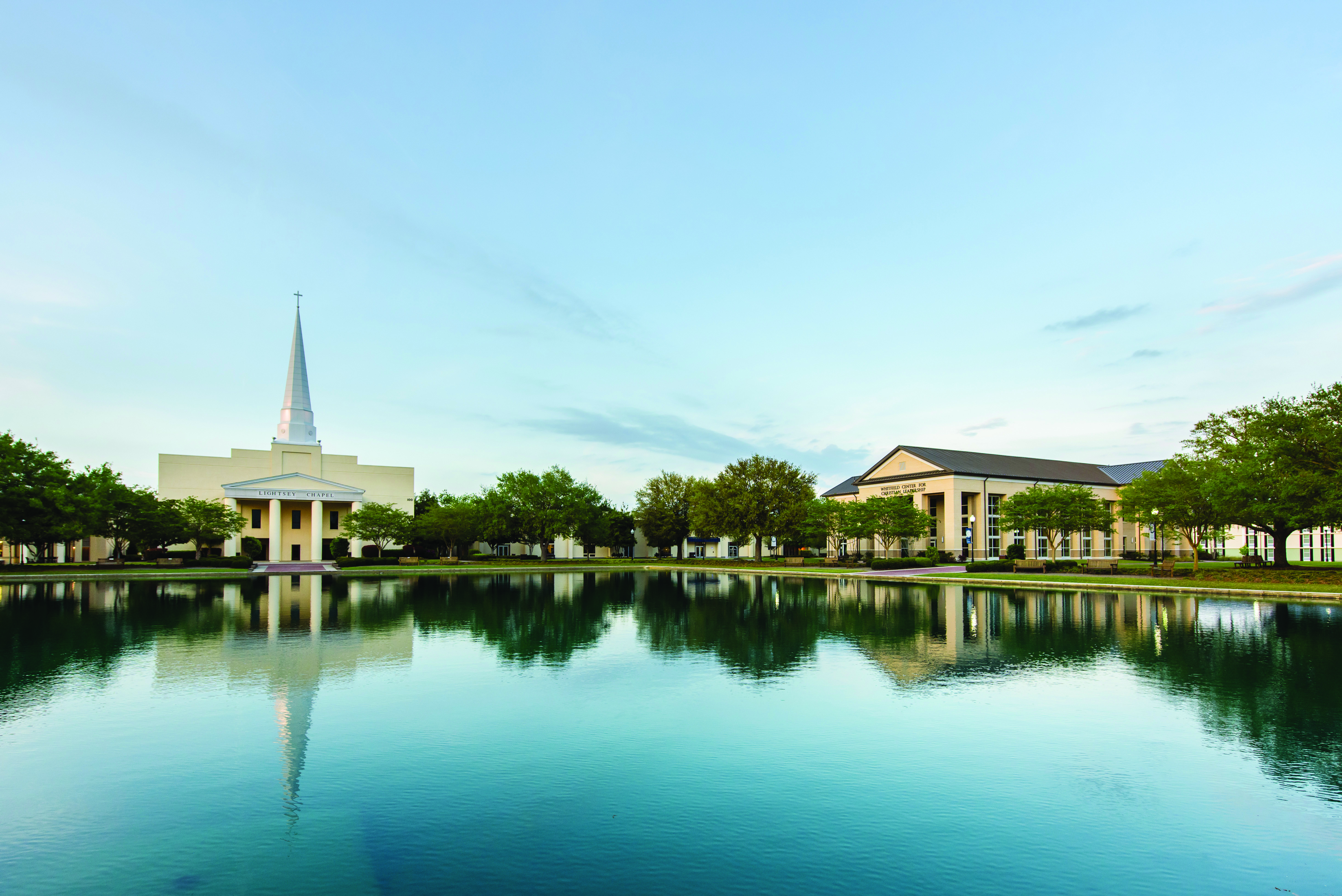
A view of the campus

Charleston Southern is located off Exit 205B on I-26 in North Charleston, South Carolina. It is situated on 300 acres (121 ha), formerly the site of a rice and indigo plantation.

== Leadership ==
=== President ===
B. Keith Faulkner is the fourth and current president of Charleston Southern University. He is the first alumnus of the school to serve as president.

- John A. Hamrick (1964–1984)
- Jairy C. Hunter Jr. (1984–2018)
- Dondi E. Costin (2018–2023)
- B. Keith Faulkner (2023–present)

== Student activities ==
Beyond the classroom, students can participate in a variety of campus activities including academic clubs, service organizations, intramural athletics and campus ministries. Intramural athletic activities include flag football, basketball, volleyball, ultimate frisbee, and more. Campus ministries include Cru, Fellowship of Christian Athletes, Campus Outreach, and Elevate.

=== Student life ===
Single students under 21 years of age are encouraged to live on campus. There are at least four dining facilities on campus; one is the dining hall located in the Student Center, another is Java City located near the library, Chick-fil-A and, the newest addition, The Buc Stop in the Student Center.

=== Athletics ===
The university offers intercollegiate athletics for both men and women, competing in the NCAA Division I Big South Conference. Charleston Southern fields teams in the following sports:

- Basketball
- Baseball
- Softball
- Football (Division I FCS (I-AA))
- Women's soccer
- Cross country
- Track and field
- Golf
- Women's tennis
- Volleyball

== Notable people ==
=== Alumni ===
- Michelle D. Commander, Associate Director and Curator of the Lapidus Center at the Schomburg Center for Research in Black Culture
- Fearghal Curtin (born 1998), Irish track and field athlete; Irish national record holder in the marathon and half marathon
- Charles James (born 1990), NFL football player and star of HBO's Hard Knocks
- Sam Gandy, Alzheimer's researcher
- Claudell Harris Jr. (born 2002), basketball player in the Israeli Basketball Premier League
- Bobby Parnell, MLB baseball pitcher
- Tim Scott, United States Senator
- Charlie Simpkins, track and field athlete; 1992 Olympic Games silver medalist in the triple jump
- R. J. Swindle, Canadian MLB baseball pitcher
- Tyler Thornburg, MLB baseball pitcher

=== Faculty ===
- Bob Gray, former soccer coach
