= Zizipho Poswa =

South African artist

- Born: December 5, 1979; Mthatha
- Alma mater: Cape Peninsula University of Technology

Zizipho Poswa (born December 5, 1979) is a South African artist and ceramicist based in Cape Town.

== Early life and education ==
Poswa was born on December 5, 1979 in Mthatha, and was educated at Cape Peninsula University of Technology. She studied textile design in college. She operates a studio called Imiso Ceramics with artist Andile Dyalvane. Imiso pots are carried by retailer Anthropologie.

== Work ==
Poswa's work expresses African womanhood and the role that Xhosa women play in contemporary life. She produces large-scale, hand-built sculptural pieces. Her iLobola series draws inspiration from the Xhosa rituals of lobola, or bride-wealth, the tradition of paying the bride's family with cattle. She has also drawn from the labor of rural women and traditional hairstyles.

== Career ==
Powsa has shown her work at Design Miami, Salon Art + Design, and Southern Guild gallery. Her work was included in the exhibition Before Yesterday We Could Fly at the Metropolitan Museum of Art. Her first solo exhibit in the United States, "iiNtsika zeSizwe (The Pillars of the Nation)" was held at New York’s Galerie56 in the Spring of 2023.

Their works are in these collections: Metropolitan Museum of Art, Los Angeles County Museum of Art, Philadelphia Museum of Art.
