= Noé Duchaufour-Lawrance =

French designer

- Born: 25 July 1974 (age 52); Mende
- Occupations: Designer, glass artist, industrial designer
- Website: www.noeduchaufourlawrance.com

Noé Duchaufour Lawrance (born 25 July 1974) is a French interior designer and product designer.

== Biography ==
Noé Duchaufour-Lawrance completed his education in furniture design at École Nationale Supérieure des Arts Décoratifs and in metal sculptures at École Nationale Supérieure des Arts Appliqués, between 1992 and 1997.

Throughout his career, Duchaufour-Lawrence has created a body of work with a narrative deeply rooted in nature. He has designed a wide range of furniture collections and completed interior design projects such as boutiques for Montblanc, Air France lounge areas, the interior of the Ciel de Paris and London-based Sketch restaurants, and private residences. More recently he initiated the project "MADE IN SITU" in a Lisbon gallery.

His product designs include designer chairs, lamps, and sofas. He has designed products for companies such as Saint Louis, Hermès, Ligne Roset, Cinna, Ceccotti Collezioni, Tai Ping and Bernhardt Design, Baccarat, and Petite Friture. For example, he created the "Hybride" chair for Cinna, the "Market" chair for Petite Friture the "Fluid" lamp for Forestier, and the "Folia" collection for Saint-Louis.

In 2021, the exhibition "Emphatic: Discovering a Glass Legacy" at Punta Conterie Gallery in Murano, Italy, alongside works by Duchaufour-Lawrance, as well as designers Ini Archibong, GamFratesi, Benjamin Hubert, Richard Hutten, Luca Nichetto, Elena Salmistraro, and Marc Thorpe.

== Awards and honors ==
- NeoCon Silver Award, Lounge Furniture Collections category, for the Modern Family Collection, Bernhardt Design
- NeoCon Silver Award, Side Tables category, for tables Chance and Clue, Bernhardt Design
- Label Via 2015 for "Ciel!" chair edited by Tabisso and the desk "Inside World" edited by Cinna
- Janus du Commerce Air France, salon business CDG, hall M
- GQ Men of the year 2012 "Best Designer"
- Red Dot Award Product design 2011 for the Bernhardt Design Corvo chair
- Best of NeoCon GOLD Award for the Bernhardt Design Corvo chair
- Laureat for the "L'Empreinte de l'Année" and Talents du luxe et de la création 2010
- Award "Elle Déco International Design Awards"
- Wallpaper Design Awards 2009 for the bed "Buonanotte Valentina" edited at Ceccotti Collezioni
- Designer of the year Scènes d'intérieur, Maison & Objet, Paris
- Time out magazine eating and drinking awards, Restaurant Sketch, Best design, London
- Hotel and restaurant Magazine, Restaurant Sketch, Best design, London
- Theme Magazine, Restaurant Sketch, Best design, London
- Tatler Restaurant Awards, Best Design: The Gallery, Restaurant Sketch, London

== Personal and collective exhibitions ==
=== 2016 ===
- Individual exhibition: "Carte blanche", exhibition of the Transmissions collection, Galerie des Gobelins, Paris
- Collective exhibition: "Design @ Farnese", exhibition of the Kinetic table, Palazzo Farnese, Rome
- Individual exhibition as part of the Grand Paris D'Days Design Festival: Exhibition of the Odyssey table at the invitation of the Manufacture of Sèvres, Galerie de Sèvres, Paris
- Collective exhibition: exhibition of the Transmissions collection, exhibition AD, Hôtel de la Marine, Paris

=== 2015 ===
- Collective exhibition: "The cabinet of curiosities" by Thomas Erber, exhibition of the Mangrove table, Galerie Molière, Paris
- Collective exhibition: "So Paper and Chenel processes", Ateliers Chenel, Vanves

=== 2012 ===
- Individual exhibition: "Passage 2006–2012 " exhibition at Sivera Wagram showroom, Paris 17eme
- "Connexions" exhibition: 6 years of collaboration with Ceccotti collezioni during the furniture fair in April, Ceccotti showroom, Milan

=== 2008 ===
- Individual exhibition: "Marée noire au clair de lune" exhibition at the Pierre Bergé gallery, Brussels, Belgium

=== 2005 ===
- VIPP- customization of a 'VIPP waste bin' for the benefit of Handicap International, Silvera showroom, Paris

=== 2004 ===
- Tokyo Designers Block, 'everything is in everything,' video, sound and smell exhibition, Tokyo
- Forum diffusion, Designers days 2004, Corian®, Five senses, one material, Paris

=== 2003 ===
- Expérimenta Design, VIA, Design France: Innovation and inspiration, Lisbon
- BETC, placenta design, Paris

== Books published ==
=== 2016 ===
- Expérimenta Design, VIA, Design France: Innovation and inspiration, Lisbon
- Le design du pouvoir, l'Atelier de Recherche et de Création du Mobilier national – editions mare & martin – Transmissions Collection
- Come on! What is the future of Design, Top 40 French Creatives, author Yen Kien Hang
- #Cloud.paris – PCA editions – E-Lounge

=== 2015 ===
- Le cabinet de curiosités de Thomas Erber – imprimerie du Marais – iPad cover with St Loup and Mangrove Table

=== 2014 ===
- Paris Designers and their Interiors – Editions Luster – Noé Duchaufour-Lawrance's main house

=== 2013 ===
- Space Plus –Sandu Publishing – Ciel de Paris
- Living in Style –teNeues Publishing – Chalet La Transhumance

=== 2012 ===
- House Design – A&C Publishing Co., Ltd éditions – Chalet La Transhumance
- Senequier – Verlhac éditions – Sénequier

=== 2009 ===
- Design and Literature –Norma éditions

=== 2008 ===
- Box Circa 40_2 – Fiera Milano editore

=== 2007 ===
- Contemporary World Interiors – Phaidon Press – Sketch
- Wallpaper City Guide Paris – Phaidon – Senderens
- Wallpaper City Guide Londres – Phaidon press – Sketch

=== 2004 ===
- Bars + Bares, Designer & Design – H Kliczowski publishing – Sketch
- Cool restaurants London – TeNeus publishing – Sketch
- Restaurant Design – DAAB publishing – Sketch
- Les plus beaux restaurants du monde, design & architecture – Pyramid publishing

=== 2020 ===
- Made In Situ Gallery opening – 'Barro Negro' exhibition
- Made In Situ Gallery – 'Burnt Cork' exhibition
