= Fabiola Jean-Louis =

Haitian artist

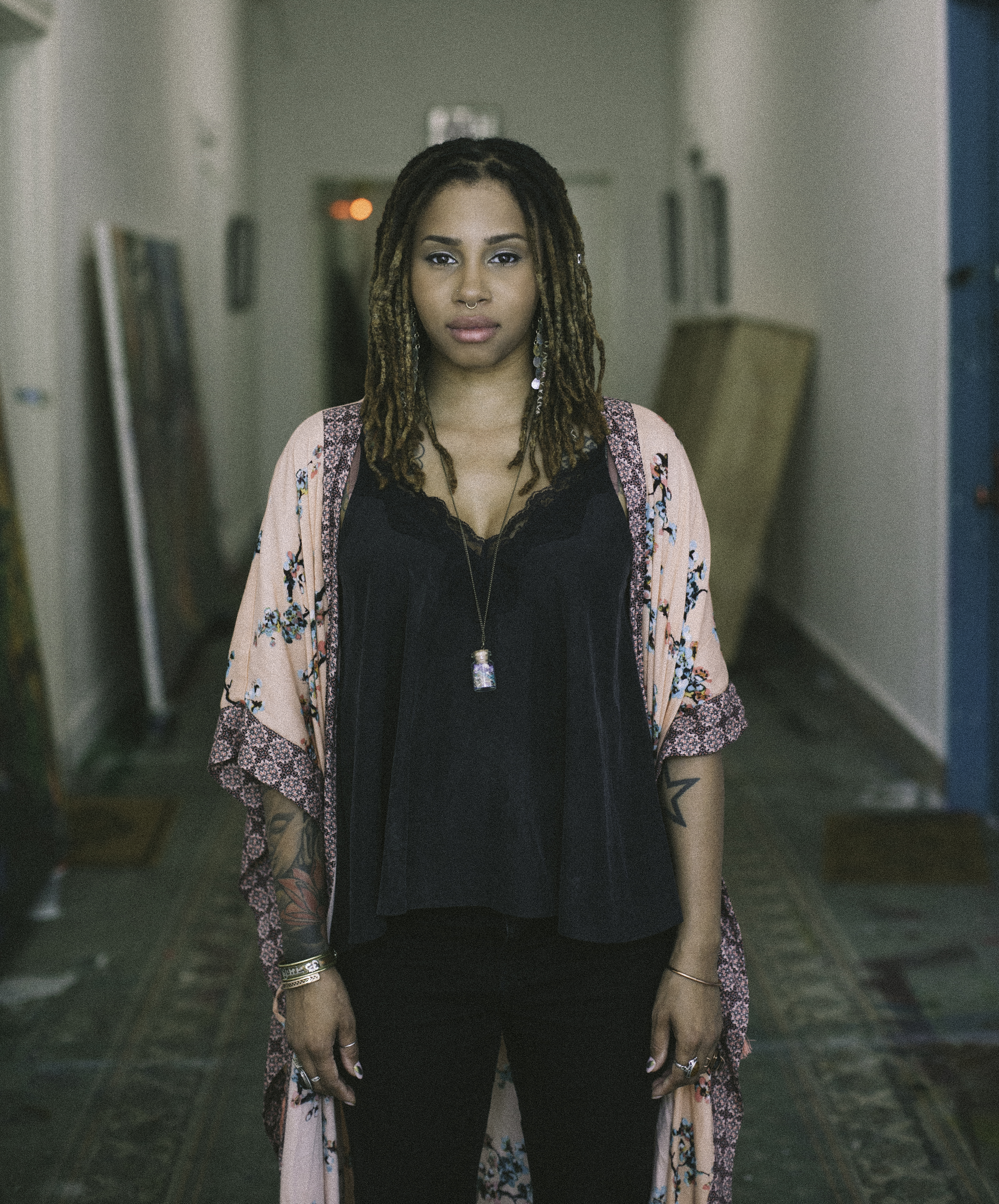
- Fabiola Jean-Louis
- Born: September 10, 1978 (age 47); Port Au Prince, Haiti
- Education: High School of Fashion Industries, City-As-School, Nova Southeastern University
- Known for: Photography, Sculpture, Haute Couture
- Style: Intersectionality, Afrofuturism
- Awards: National Endowment for the Arts
- Website: http://www.fabiolajeanlouis.com

Fabiola Jean-Louis (born September 10, 1978) is a Haitian artist working in photography, paper textile design, and sculpture. Her work examines the intersectionality of the Black experience, particularly that of women, to address the absence and imbalance of historical representation of African American and Afro-Caribbean people. Jean-Louis has earned residencies at the Museum of Art and Design (MAD), New York City, the Lux Art Institute, San Diego, and the Andrew Freedman Home in The Bronx. In 2021, Jean-Louis became the first Haitian woman artist to exhibit at the Metropolitan Museum of Art. Fabiola lives and works in New York City.

== Biography ==
Fabiola Jean-Louis was born in Port au Prince, Haiti in 1978 before relocating with her family to Harlem, New York around the age of 2. Jean-Louis is an alumna of both Fashion Industries High-school and City-As-School. She later attended Nova Southeastern University in Fort Lauderdale, Florida with plans to study medicine before dropping out three months shy of graduation to pursue a career in art. She is currently based in Brooklyn, New York.

== Career ==
Fabiola Jean-Louis is an artist who uses photography to recreate elaborate eighteenth century-inspired portraiture that centers Black women. As part of her process, Jean-Louis creates opulent dresses and other fashion accessories out of paper and then stages idealized eighteenth century scenes. She says, "My work always centralizes around the black and brown female body, and it's looking at society--our place in society." Art critic, Felicia Feaster, states, "Jean-Louis is in the business of both questioning the uniformity of our visual culture -- and its glorification of only the dominant European ruling class -- while also pondering a disturbing element of many classical paintings, which balance refined beauty against scenes of war, rape and destruction."

Jean-Louis's rise to fame began in 2014 when she started experimenting with conceptional photography by blending science, technology, art, and design with the magical, mystical, and fantastical. She used paper to recreate baroque gowns because, "As a black woman, I learned to do without, to make the best of having nothing sometimes. And fine fabric is expensive. You want to make these amazing, baroque gowns but you need to have the money for that."

In 2021, the Metropolitan Museum of Art commissioned Fabiola to make a life-size paper sculpture to be featured in their two year exhibition, Before Yesterday We Could Fly: An Afrofuturist Period Room. This made Jean-Louis the first Haitian woman to be exhibited in the museum.

== Works ==
=== ReWriting History ===
ReWriting History is a series by Jean-Louis that sheds light on the absence of Black people in historical portraiture with antithetical scenes of reappropriated history. Consisting of photographs and sculpture, Jean-Louis makes paper dresses and accessories reminiscent of garments worn by old-world nobility then photographs her subjects wearing them. The series is confounded by the mistreatment of Black bodies over centuries of enslavement, using references such as "The Whipped Back" of Gordon that features keloid scaring replicated on the dress seen in Jean-Louis' photograph, "Madame Beauvoir's Painting." In April of 2021, Beinecke Rare Book & Manuscript Library at Yale University announced the acquisition of the Rewriting History portfolio.

=== Solo exhibitions ===
- 2019: Andrew Freedman Home, Bronx, NY
- 2019: Lux Art Institute, San Diego, CA
- 2018: BRIC Gallery, Brooklyn, NY
- 2017: DuSable Museum of African American History, Chicago, IL
- 2017: Alan Avery Art Company, Atlanta, GA
- 2016: The Harlem School of the Arts, Harlem, NY

=== Group exhibitions ===
- 2022: Our Colonial Inheritance, Tropenmuseum, Amsterdam, Netherlands
- 2021: Before Yesterday We Could Fly: An Afrofuturist Period Room, Metropolitan Museum of Art, New York City, NY
- 2019: The Rest of History, Virginia Museum of Contemporary Art, Virginia Beach, VA
- 2018: Dressed, The Window Gallery at The Paul Robeson Galleries, Newark, NJ
- 2018: Bordering the Imaginary: Art from the Dominican Republic, Haiti, and their Diasporas, BRIC, Brooklyn, NY
- 2017: Visionary Aponte; Art and Black Freedom, Art of Black Miami, Little Haiti Cultural Center, Art Basel, Miami, FL
- 2017: High John the Conqueror Ain’t Got Nothing on Me: American Hoodoo and Southern Black American-Centric Spiritual Ways, Rush Philanthropic, Rush Arts Philadelphia, Philadelphia, PA
- 2016: Africa Forecast: Fashioning Contemporary Life, Spelman College Museum of Fine Art, Atlanta, GA
- 2016: The Boundless Group Exhibition, Brooklyn Historical Society, Brooklyn, NY
- 2016: Metamorphosis Group Exhibition, Arts East New York Gallery, Brooklyn, NY
- 2015: Women as Witness, TI Art Studios, Brooklyn, NY
- 2014: Sixth Annual Juried Student Exhibition, Nova Southeastern University, Fort Lauderdale-Davie, FL

=== Artist residency ===
- 2021: University of Central Arkansas, Conway, AR
- 2019: Lux Art Institute, San Diego, CA
- 2017: Museum of Arts and Design, New York City, NY

=== Selected collections ===
- Andrew Freedman Home, The Bronx, NY
- Hunter Museum, Chattanooga, TN
- New York University, New York City, NY
- Spelman College Museum, Atlanta, GA
- Yale University, New Haven, CT
