= Console television =

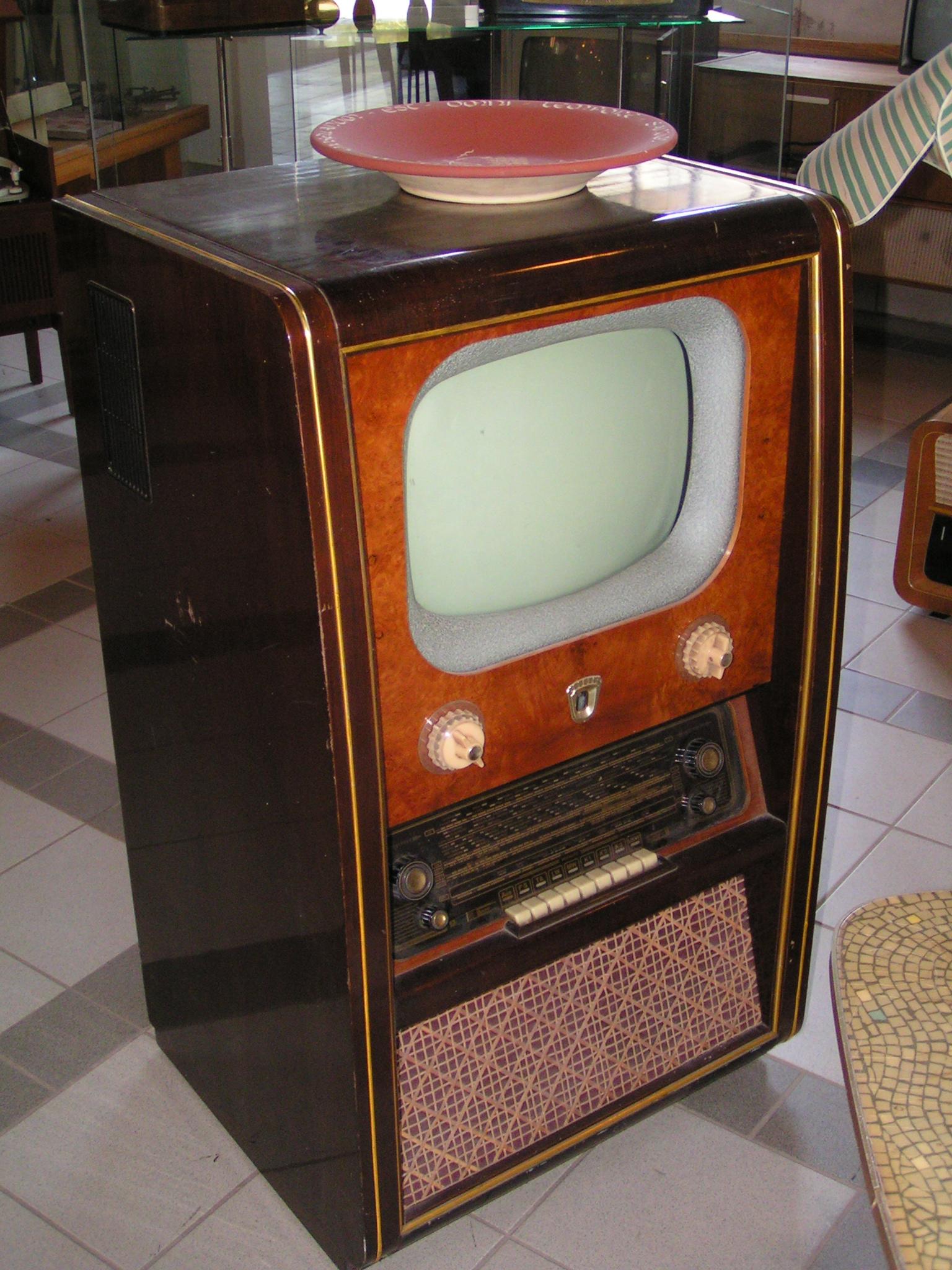
Console television set

A console television is a type of CRT television most popular in, but not exclusive to, the United States and Canada. Console CRT televisions are distinguished from standard CRT televisions by their factory-built, non-removable, wooden cabinets and speakers, which form an integral part of the television's design.

Best suited to television sizes of under 30 inches, they eventually became obsolete due to the increasing popularity of ever larger televisions in the late 1980s onward. However, they were manufactured and used well into the early 2000s.

== Description ==
Console televisions were originally accommodated in approximately rectangular radiogram style cabinets and included radio and record player facilities. However, from approximately the mid-1970s onwards, as radiograms decreased and Hi-fi equipment increased in popularity, console televisions became more cuboid in shape and contained most commonly television, and radio receiving features, and less commonly the addition of an eight track player.

== Manufacturers ==
Companies that made these types of television included Zenith, RCA, Panasonic, Sony, Magnavox, Mitsubishi, Sylvania, and Quasar.
