= Marc Thorpe =

American artist

Marc Thorpe (9 November 1946 – 24 November 2023) was an American artist and designer known for creating the Robot Wars.

== Early life and education ==
Born in San Francisco, Thorpe studied at California State University, Hayward, and the University of California, Davis.

== Career ==
Earlier in his career, in 1974, Thorpe received a National Endowment for the Arts fellowship to develop "behavioral sculptures" involving trained dolphins at Marineland in Florida. The project resulted in the documentary Betty and Eva, which showcased the synchronized swimming patterns of the trained dolphins.

From 1979 to 1990, Thorpe worked at George Lucas' Industrial Light and Magic, contributing to special effects in films such as The Empire Strikes Back, Raiders of the Lost Ark, Return of the Jedi, Indiana Jones and the Temple of Doom, Dragonslayer, Poltergeist, Howard the Duck, and The Hunt for Red October.

In 1994, Thorpe launched the first Robot Wars competition in San Francisco, which featured battles between remote-controlled robots built by amateur and professional robot-builders. The concept later expanded to other U.S. cities and inspired television specials and a UK series that ran intermittently until 2018.

After leaving LucasToys in 1994, Thorpe managed Robot Wars events until 1997, when he lost creative control to Profile Records. He later held positions on the board of directors for Public Art Works in Marin County, worked as a mechanical engineer at Electronic Arts and RunBot.

Thorpe's creation of Robot Wars inspired a series of combat competitions on British television from 1998 to 2004 and again from 2016 to 2018, as well as the American series BattleBots, which has been airing since 2000.
