= Bernhardt Design =

American furniture company

- Type: Private
- Industry: Contract Interiors: Contemporary office furniture and textiles for the contract market.
- Founded: 1983
- Headquarters: Lenoir, North Carolina; United States
- Products: Upholstered seating, wood products, tables, wall units, wood seating
- Website: bernhardtdesign.com

Bernhardt Design (a division of the Bernhardt Furniture Company) is an American modern furniture company based in Lenoir, North Carolina.

== History ==
Bernhardt Furniture Company was founded in 1889 by John M. Bernhardt.

Until the 1980s, the company was vertically integrated, having a veneer mill, lumber yard and numerous kilns as well as adhesives and particleboard plants. By 1981, Bernhardt began sourcing globally and now has offices in four Asian countries, staffed with 50 employees. The company still has a significant manufacturing operation in western North Carolina, with 12 facilities and 1500 employees.

In 1983, Bernhardt Furniture added a line of commercial furniture, Bernhardt Design which offers conservatively styled casegoods, conference and occasional tables, guest, lounge and wood guest chairs. Gradually, the product line expanded, adding more contemporary products and multi-purpose tables and seating and conference chairs.
