= Laura Levine =

American multi-disciplinary visual artist

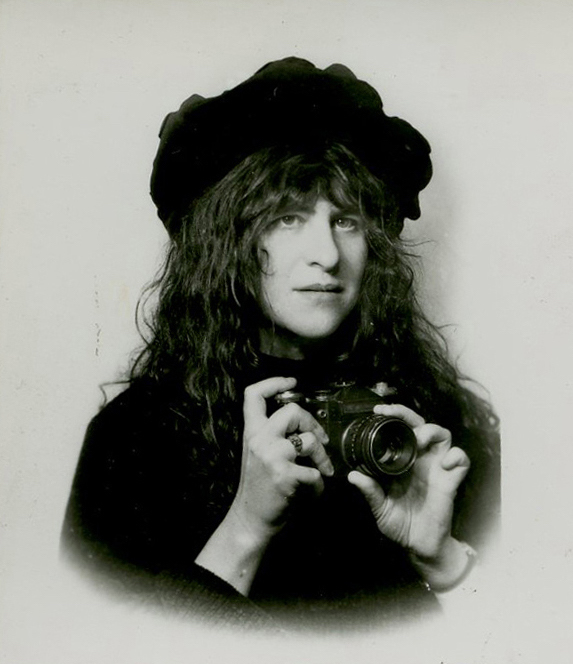
- Born: New York, New York, US
- Education: Harvard University
- Occupations: Photographer, illustrator, painter, filmmaker
- Website: www.lauralevine.com

Laura Levine is an American multi-disciplinary visual artist. She is best known for her portraits of artists from the punk, early hip-hop, New Wave, No Wave, and the early downtown New York City music scene. Levine's work includes iconic images of Björk, R.E.M., the Clash, Afrika Bambaataa, the Ramones, the Beastie Boys, Iggy Pop, and Madonna, among others.

== Early life and education ==
Levine grew up Manhattan's Chinatown. When she was fourteen, she went to a Diane Arbus exhibit at the Museum of Modern Art and developed an interest in photography. She borrowed her father's camera and signed up for after-school darkroom classes at the Henry Street Settlement and initially shot documentary-style street photographs in her neighborhood. A music fan, Levine began shooting concert performances as a teenager, sneaking her camera into venues by hiding it in her jeans. At 16, she printed a fake press pass in order to shoot Paul Simon and Patti Smith in Central Park, and after "talking herself in," she was properly credentialed as a press photographer for the first time.

Levine attended Harvard University; although she majored in anthropology, her focus in college was on photography. She shot daily new stories as the photo chairman at the Harvard Crimson, and served as a campus stringer for UPI and Newsweek. In the summer of her junior year, she interned at the Washington Post, which published more than 70 of her photos on subjects including White House press conferences, prison life, and the Goodyear Blimp.

== Career ==
=== Photography ===
After returning to New York, Levine was hired as a photo researcher at New York Magazine and interned at the Village Voice, where she was frequently assigned to shoot bands. As a photographer for the UK music magazines NME and Sounds, she was occasionally assigned to shoot British bands as they came to the United States for the first time, and notably photographed The Clash at Bond's Casino over a five-day period in 1981. Levine freelanced for Interview, the New York Times, Trouser Press, Creem, and Musician and was hired as the photo editor and chief photographer for New York Rocker in 1980. In addition, Levine independently set up shoots with bands she was interested in and did early sessions with artists such as R.E.M., the B-52s, the Bangles, and the Dream Syndicate, and provided images for album artwork for releases by artists including X, The Replacements, Robyn Hitchcock, and Joan Jett. Levine's photos were frequently shown in downtown New York galleries.

In 1994, she stopped shooting, stating that it was because of the way the circumstances changed. In a 2011 interview, she said: "Portrait sessions were becoming fashion shoots; often the styling and makeup seemed more important than the artist. I sometimes found myself on huge soundstages, often with ten or fifteen people in the room, each with an opinion about what the artist or I should be doing. I missed the intimacy and authenticity of one-on-one sessions. I was losing control of my images and what I wanted to accomplish. I could see where the industry was headed, packaging and marketing artists, and it lost its appeal to me."

In 2010, Levine's photographs were featured in Who Shot Rock & Roll: A Photographic History, 1955 to the Present, which originated at the Brooklyn Museum. In 2011, Steven Kasher Gallery signed Levine to their roster of artists presented Musicians, Levine's first solo gallery exhibition. The exhibit featured more than 35 vintage and modern photographs from Levine's archives, included one-of-a-kind gelatin silver prints.

=== Painting, illustration, and animation ===
Although her primary emphasis was on photography, throughout her career Levine has worked in other mediums, including painting, illustration, and animation. While she was shooting, she focused on the visual arts, and illustrated Shake, Rattle & Roll: The Founders of Rock & Roll: The Founders of Rock & Roll, a children's book, with words by Holly George-Warren. She then painted a series of portraits of pioneers of country music, which she adapted for the children's book. Honky Tonk Heroes and Hillbilly Angels: The Pioneers of Country & Western Music. Levine's first picture book was Wig!, a collaboration with the B-52s.

Levine's style as a painter and illustrator was described as "naif" by Kirkus Reviews. Her illustrations, which appeared in Time and New York Magazine, in addition to other publications, were similarly praised.

The illustrations Levine created for Shake, Rattle & Roll were exhibited nationally at galleries and museums including the Rock & Roll Hall of Fame and Museum in Cleveland, EMP Museum in Seattle, Yard Dog Folk Art in Austin, and the Buddy Holly Center in Lubbock, Texas. Her paintings of rock and roll pioneers are in the permanent collection of the Rock and Roll Hall of Fame and Museum.

=== Film and video ===
Levine directed several music videos, and worked with R.E.M. and other Athens, Georgia musicians on the Super-8 underground film, Just Like A Movie. She produced and directed two documentaries: Peekaboo Sunday, which was screened in competition at the Sundance Film Festival and Digging for Dutch, which won the New York City Film Project's 2001 Torchlight Award for Best Feature-Length Film.

== Personal ==
Levine lives in Soho. She owns and runs The Mystery Spot, a vintage store in Phoenicia, New York.

== Collections ==
- The Rock & Roll Hall of Fame and Museum
- The National Portrait Gallery / Smithsonian Institution
- Museum of Fine Arts, Houston
- The House of Blues
- The Experience Music Project, Seattle
- The Buddy Holly Center, Lubbock, Texas

== Selected exhibitions ==
=== Solo ===
- Musicians, Steven Kasher Gallery, New York City (2011)
- Duncan Miller Gallery, Los Angeles, California (2007)

=== Group ===
- American Cool, The National Portrait Gallery / Smithsonian Institution
- Looking at Music 3.0, The Museum of Modern Art, New York City (2012)
- Backstage Pass: Rock & Roll Photography, The Currier Museum of Art, Manchester (2012)
- Who Shot Rock and Roll: A Photographic History, The Annenberg Space for Photography, Los Angeles, California (2012)
- Open for the Stone, Volume 2, Harper's Books, East Hampton, New York (2012)
- Women Who Rock: Vision, Passion, Power, The Rock and Roll Hall of Fame, Cleveland, Ohio (2012)
- Fifty Years of Rock n' Roll: Women Who Made Rock, Adris Gallery, Rovinj, Croatia (2011)
- Vivienne Westwood 1980-1989, The Museum of FIT, New York City (2011)
- Hip-Hop, A Cultural Odyssey, The Grammy Museum, Los Angeles, California (2011)
- From Her To Eternity: The Women Who Photograph Music, Wabash Arts Corridor, Chicago (2023)

== Awards ==
- Aperture Award from Rave Magazine
- "Forty Top Magazine Covers" from the American Society of Magazine Editors
- Torchlight Award for Best Feature Length Film

== Bibliography ==
- Honky-Tonk Heroes and Hillbilly Angels: The Pioneers of Country & Western Music published by Houghton Mifflin (2006)
- Shake, Rattle & Roll: The Founders of Rock & Roll published by Houghton Mifflin (2001)
- Wig! published by Hyperion (1995)
