= Giulio Cappellini =

Italian design entrepreneur

- Cappellini sitting backwards on an S-Chair (2023)
- Born: 1953 (age 72–73); Milan
- Notable work: Cappellini S.p.A.
- Awards: Compasso d'Oro (Associazione per il Disegno Industriale)

Giulio Cappellini is the founder and art director of the eponymous Italian furniture company Cappellini based in Milan. In 2004 the Company became part of the Poltrona Frau Group. In 2021, it was acquired by the American office furnisher Haworth Inc.

== Biography ==
Cappellini studied architect at Polytechnic University of Milan.

His company's collections are "known for tapping new trends and far-flung talents" and have included sofas, kitchen sinks, shelving and light fixtures "displayed in an industrial hangar far from the gold-plated shopping district along the Via Monte Napoleone."

Described as a "tutti-frutti affair, with minimalism offered up alongside pop fashion, computer tech and amoebic forms", Cappellini's collections have included works by Jasper Morrison, Tom Dixon, Marc Newson, Marcel Wanders, Erwan & Ronan Bouroullec, Elena Salmistraro, Nendo, Michael Young, Satyendra Pakhale, Inga Sempé, Alessandro Mendini, Dror Benshetrit, Patricia Urquiola, and Shiro Kuramata.

In 2022 Cappellini was the recipient of a Compasso d'Oro Career Award conferred by the Associazione per il Disegno Industriale (ADI) in Milan.

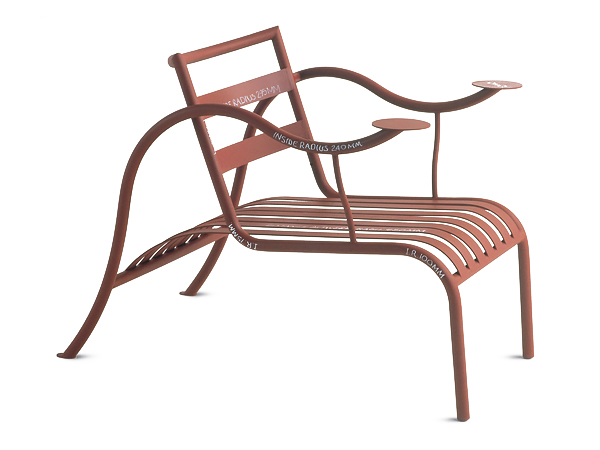
Thinking Man's Chair by Jasper Morrison (Aram version from 1987–1988 pictured)

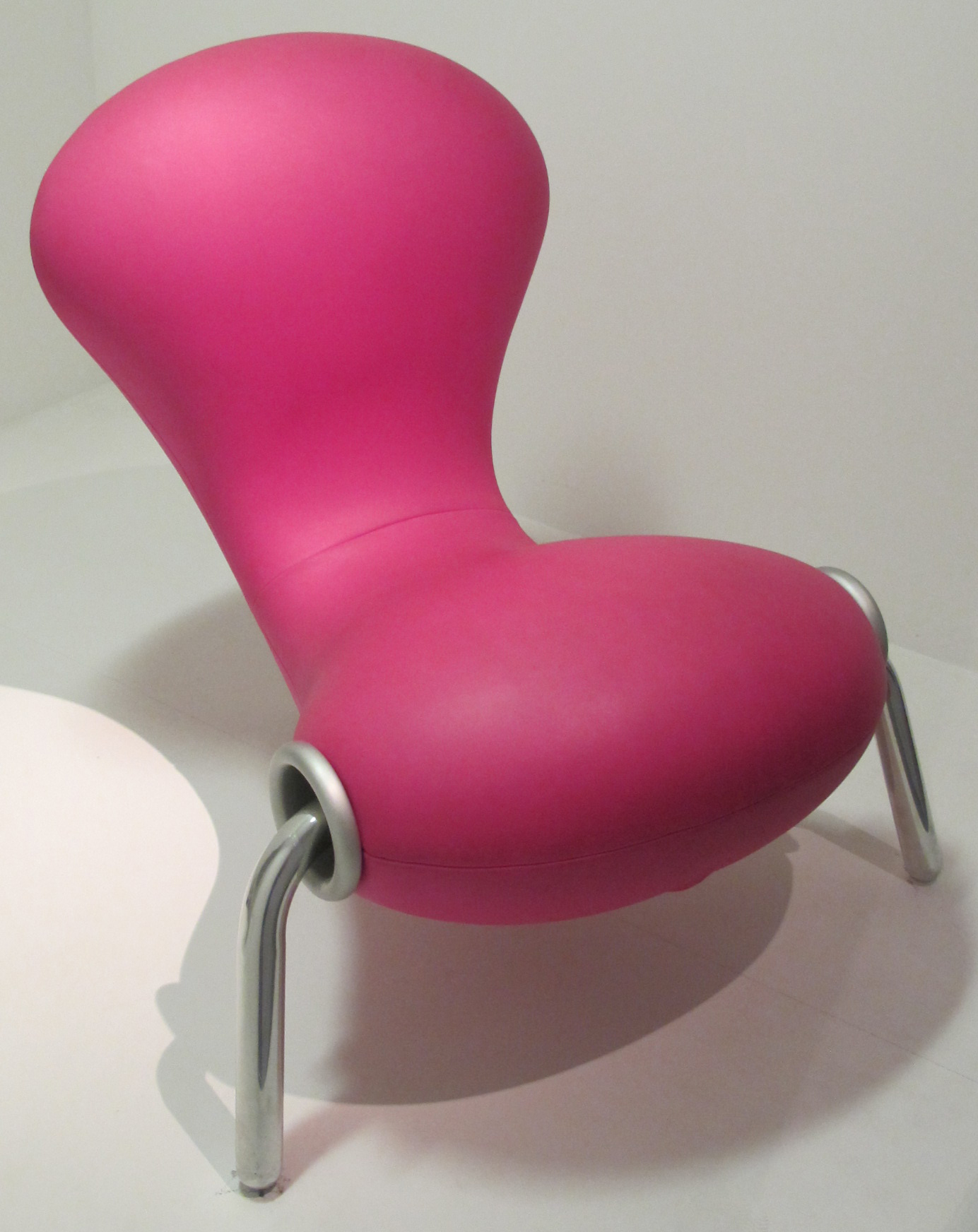
Embryo chair by Marc Newson

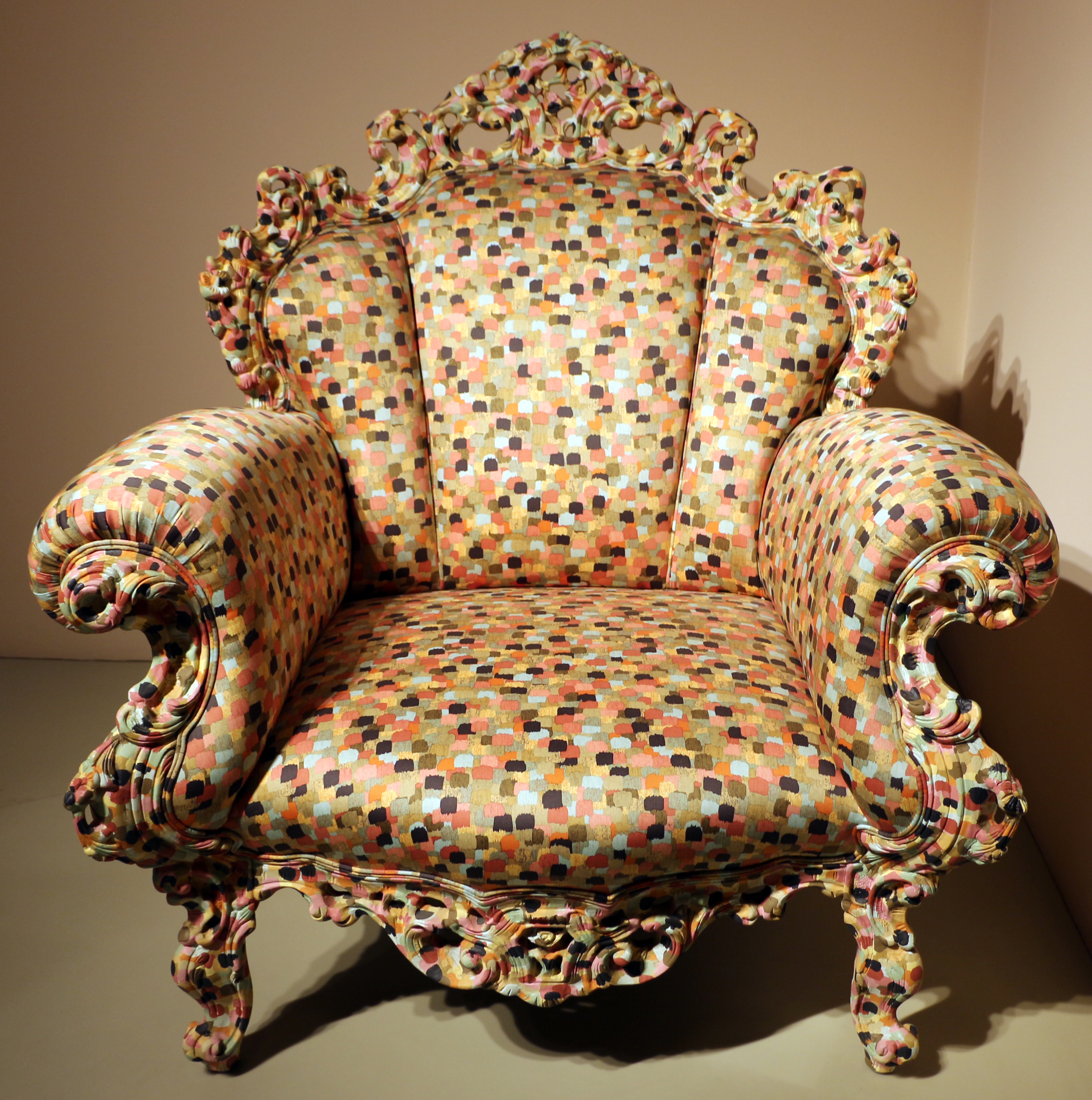
Proust chair by Alessandro Mendini
(Original, 1978; Cappellini edition, 2003)

S-Chair by Tom Dixon

Progetti Compiuti by Shiro Kuramata (Original, 1970; Cappellini edition, 1980s)

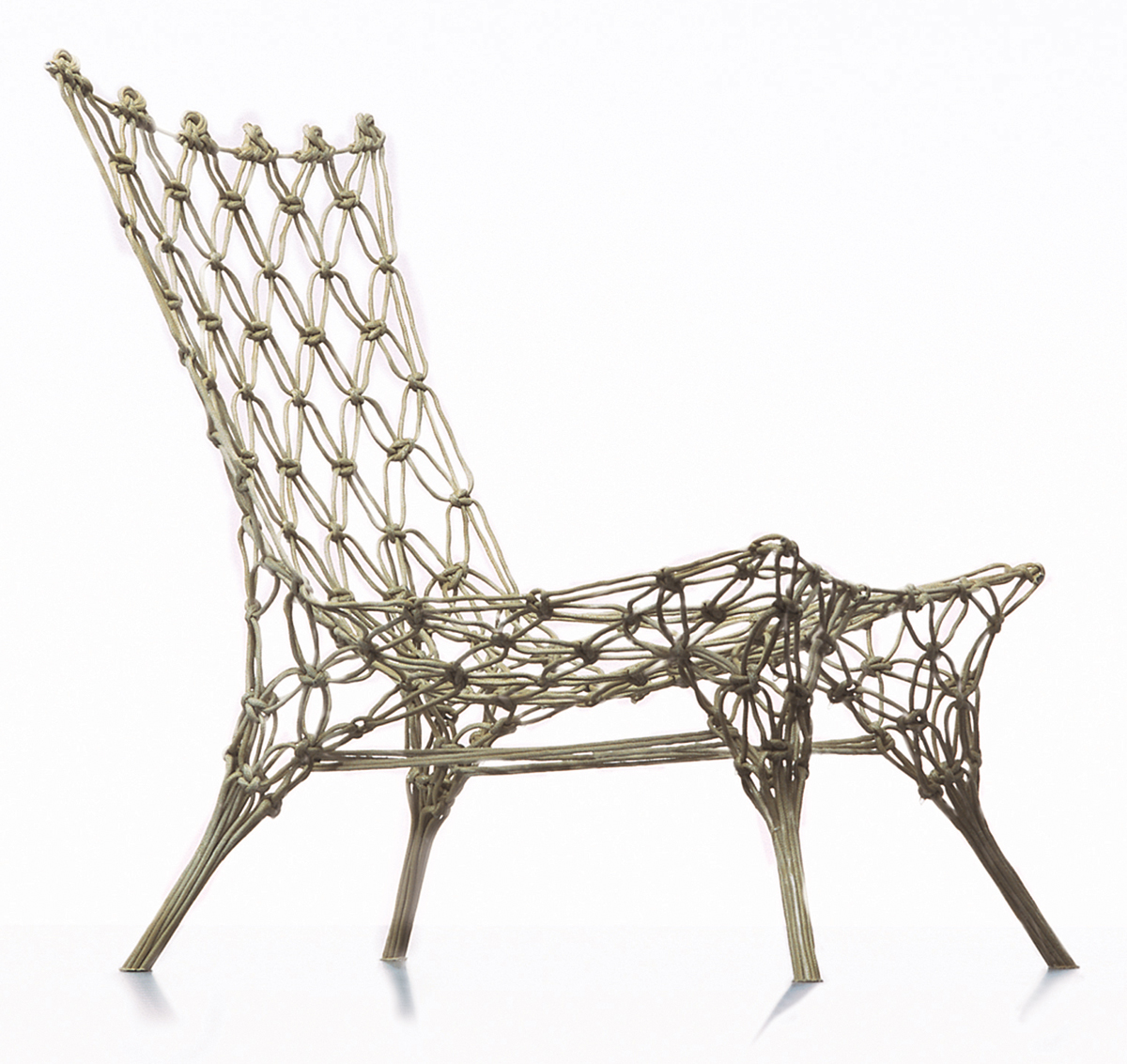
Knotted chair by Marcel Wanders

== Publications ==
- Serrazanetti, Francesca (2017). The Cappellini method: a performing dream. Richard Sadleir (1 ed.). Milan, Italy: Electa. ISBN 978-88-918122-8-5. OCLC 1017722625.
