= Tom Dixon (industrial designer) =

British designer and creative director

Tom Dixon CBE
- Dixon with a little white dog (2013)
- Born: 21 May 1959 (age 67); Sfax
- Occupations: Businessperson, creative director, designer, musician, welder
- Awards: Officer of the Order of the British Empire (2001, Elizabeth II); honorary doctor of the Birmingham City University (2004); honorary doctor of the University of Arts of London (2007); London Design Medal (2019); Commander of the Order of the British Empire (2025, Charles III)
- Website: tomdixon.net

Tom Dixon On Design (brief film)

Thomas Dixon (born 21 May 1959 in Sfax, Tunisia) is an autodidact British design entrepreneur. He is the creative director of the lighting, furniture, and household accessories brand "Tom Dixon.” The company's products are sold worldwide and shown at events such as the Milan Furniture Fair, Maison&Objet, and the London Design Festival. Dixon also spent 10 years as the head of design at Habitat. His architectural practice, “Design Research Studio” has designed restaurants, clubs, retail spaces and galleries, installations, hotels, and residential projects. Dixon's work is in many private and public collections including the Museum of Modern Art, Vitra Design Museum, Centre Georges Pompidou, and the Victoria and Albert Museum. In 2025 he was appointed CBE for services to British Design.

== Career ==
Prior to becoming a designer, Dixon was the bass guitarist for the Brit funk band Funkapolitan, appearing on Top of the Pops and touring with the Clash, Rita and Ziggy Marley, and Simple Minds. In 1981 Funkapolitan supported the Clash on their US Tour as one of only three British bands that opened for them at Bonds International Casino in New York (the other two were the Slits, and the Equators).

A series of motorbike accidents and a broken arm curtailed Dixon's musical career and led him to experiment with making welded objects. He describes welding as “a magic glue” that allowed him to “turn scrap metal into gold”, and credits his discovery of the welding torch and "the joy of metalwork and resolving problems", which sparked this experimental phase of his creative development, as the reason he became a designer.

Although by the mid-1980s Dixon was becoming increasingly well known in England and beyond, he was described at the time as "the talented untrained designer with a line in welded salvage furniture". Dixon himself readily and wryly admitted that his "only qualification [as a designer] is a one-day course in plastic bumper repair." Paul Smith, the British tailor and founder of the eponymous fashion house, who is an early client and the godfather of Dixon’s daughter, said that, "[Tom] understands the use of materials, the process of manufacturing and the importance of thinking about how something will ultimately be used.”

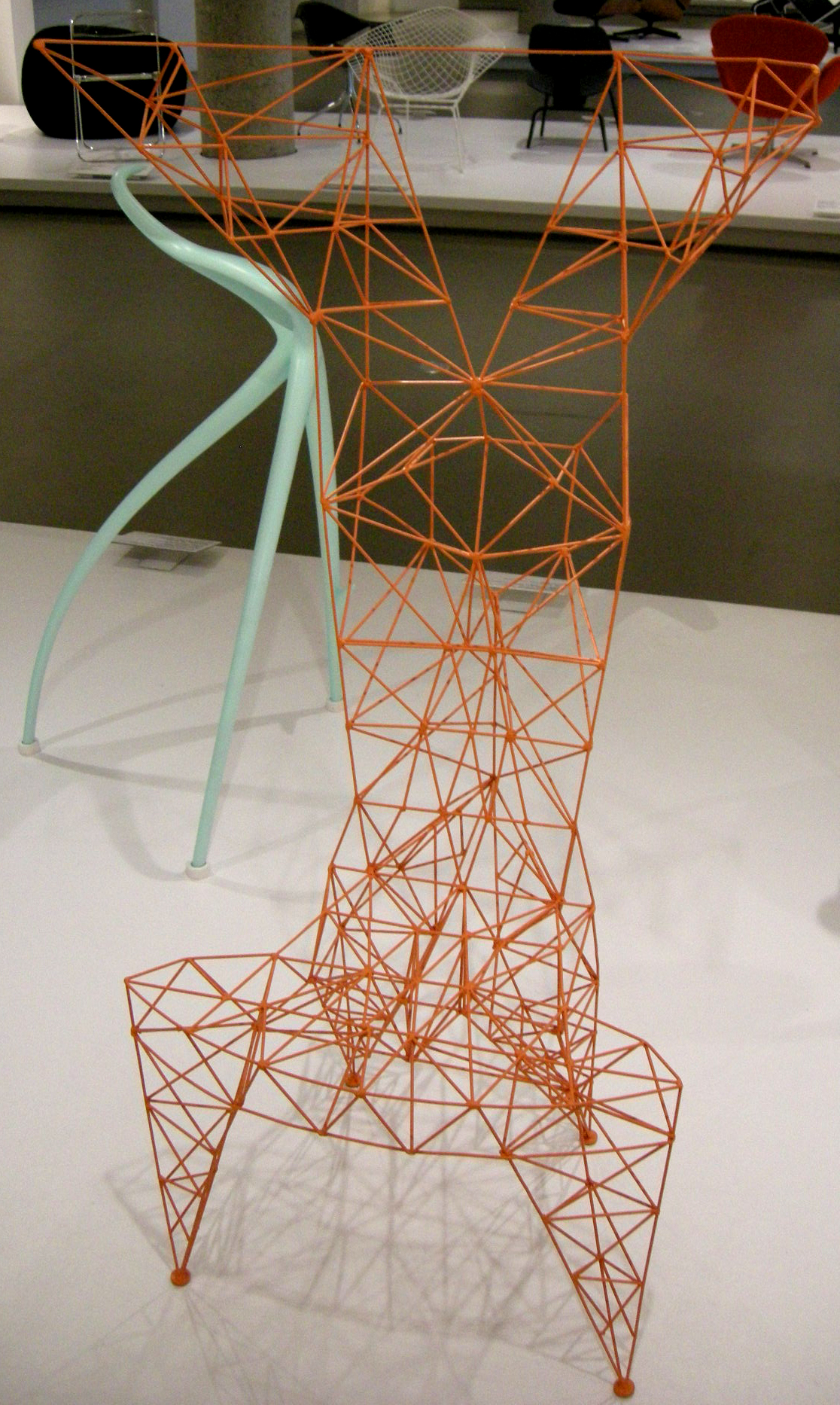
Pylon chair in the National Gallery of Victoria (1991)

His studio, which was then called Creative Salvage, became a think-tank for Dixon and other young designers such as Michael Anastassiades, Mark Brazier-Jones, Thomas Heatherwick, Nick Jones, and Michael Young, all of whom either worked with or for Dixon at the time. Recollecting on this period of his career, Dixon observed,

I do think that the punk movement definitely did liberate a whole generation of people from feeling that they had to a.) conform, or b.) even be any good in a formal way to produce. The most important thing became attitude and uniqueness and not a polished outcome.

The V&A collection's curatorial notes describe the studio as "Untrained and underground, Creative Salvage was the furniture equivalent of punk". By the late 1980s, he was collaborating with the Italian design impresario Giulio Cappellini, whose company still manufactures and distributes a number of Dixon's designs such as his S-Chair and Pylon chair.

S-Chair for Cappellini (late 1980s)

Dixon's work was included in the 1993 exhibition In the Swim organized by the British European Design Group and Helmut Diez in Bremerhaven, Germany. The show was described in Der Spiegel as the "greatest exhibition of British furniture design of the 20th century". Unique examples of his work from this period have been exhibited by Friedman Benda and other international galleries and museums, and are held in many private and public collections around the world such as the Victoria and Albert Museum in London and the National Museums Liverpool in the UK; the Vitra Design Museum in Weil am Rhein, Germany; the M+ museum in Hong Kong; National Crafts Museum in Japan; the National Gallery of Victoria in Australia; and the San Francisco Museum of Modern Art, Denver Art Museum, Cooper Hewitt, and Museum of Modern Art in the US.

In 1994, Dixon established his own gallery and shop called "Space", and in 1996 he launched a new brand called "Eurolounge". The company made a rotationally moulded polyethylene object dubbed “Jack” for which it became well known. The design, which Dixon described as a "sitting, stacking, lighting thing", won the 1997 Millennium Mark Award for Great British Design.

Dixon was hired by Habitat in 1998 to lead its design department. He soon became the public face of the creative team that was responsible for rejuvenating the brand, and he was subsequently promoted to the role of Creative Director. Dixon credits his decade working at Habitat with enabling him to learn the business side of design. He left the company in 2008.

While at Habitat, in 2002 Dixon also established his own brand called simply "Tom Dixon.” which he based in Kings Cross, London. He also served as Creative Director of the Finnish brand Artek for several years beginning in 2004, and later worked with the Swedish investors Proventus to expand the Tom Dixon. brand under a holding company for design and product development which oversees his various companies. New collections of Dixon's lighting and furniture designs have since been launched at regular intervals during the Milan Furniture Fair, the London Design Festival, and other trade and public events. In 2012 the company launched its first accessories range at Maison&Objet in Paris. In 2017, "Super Texture", the first Tom Dixon. branded textile collection was launched. It featured three sets of cushions, two of which were commissioned from British textile artist Josephine Ortega – Paint and Abstract. Her designs were urban-inspired, with bright colours and varying textures. A third set called Geo used hand and machine embroidery to create the impression of layered rocks and sediment.The company's products are sold internationally in 65 countries.

In 2007 Dixon expanded his West London Studio by creating the Design Research Studio for interior and architectural design. Design Research Studio has worked on the design and development of high-end restaurants such as Jamie Oliver’s London restaurant, Barbecoa, and "Restaurant" at The Royal Academy in London. The studio also designed the private members' club Shoreditch House in East London for the Soho House group. In 2014, Design Research Studio completed their first hotel project, renovating Sea Containers House for the Morgans Hotel Group, and has also designed cruise ship interiors, corporate offices, and private residential spaces. In 2016, Dixon and Revolution Precrafted developed a design for a prefabricated house, aptly named HOME. In 2017 he designed a bed for Ikea.

In 2025, Dixon was among 35 UK designers to sign a letter to the Department for Science, Innovation and Technology secretary Peter Kyle urging the government to reconsider its plans to allow artificial intelligence companies to train their models on copyrighted works without permission.

Dixon opened a Tom Dixon. shop in New York's SoHo in 2026. At the time, he said that he doesn't "act like a designer" and that he is "interested in entrepreneurship, the communication of ideas, the sculpture of an object, the engineering to bring it to market, and the craft involved in the process." He concluded that "Luckily, design allows me to activate all of these disparate threads in my own brand" and also commented in Domus magazine that "designers should stop making ridiculous objects for rich people."

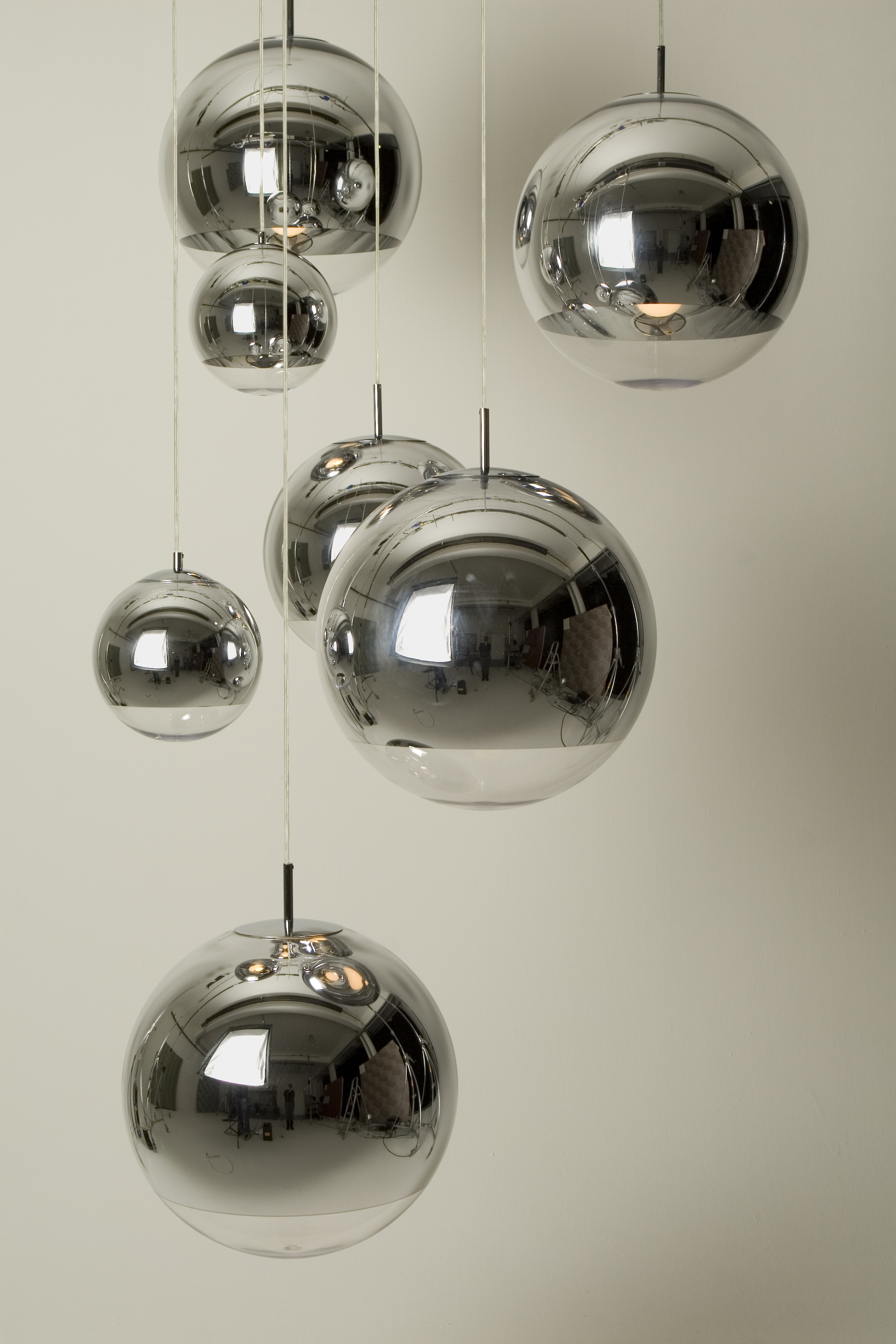
Mirrorballs pendant lamps

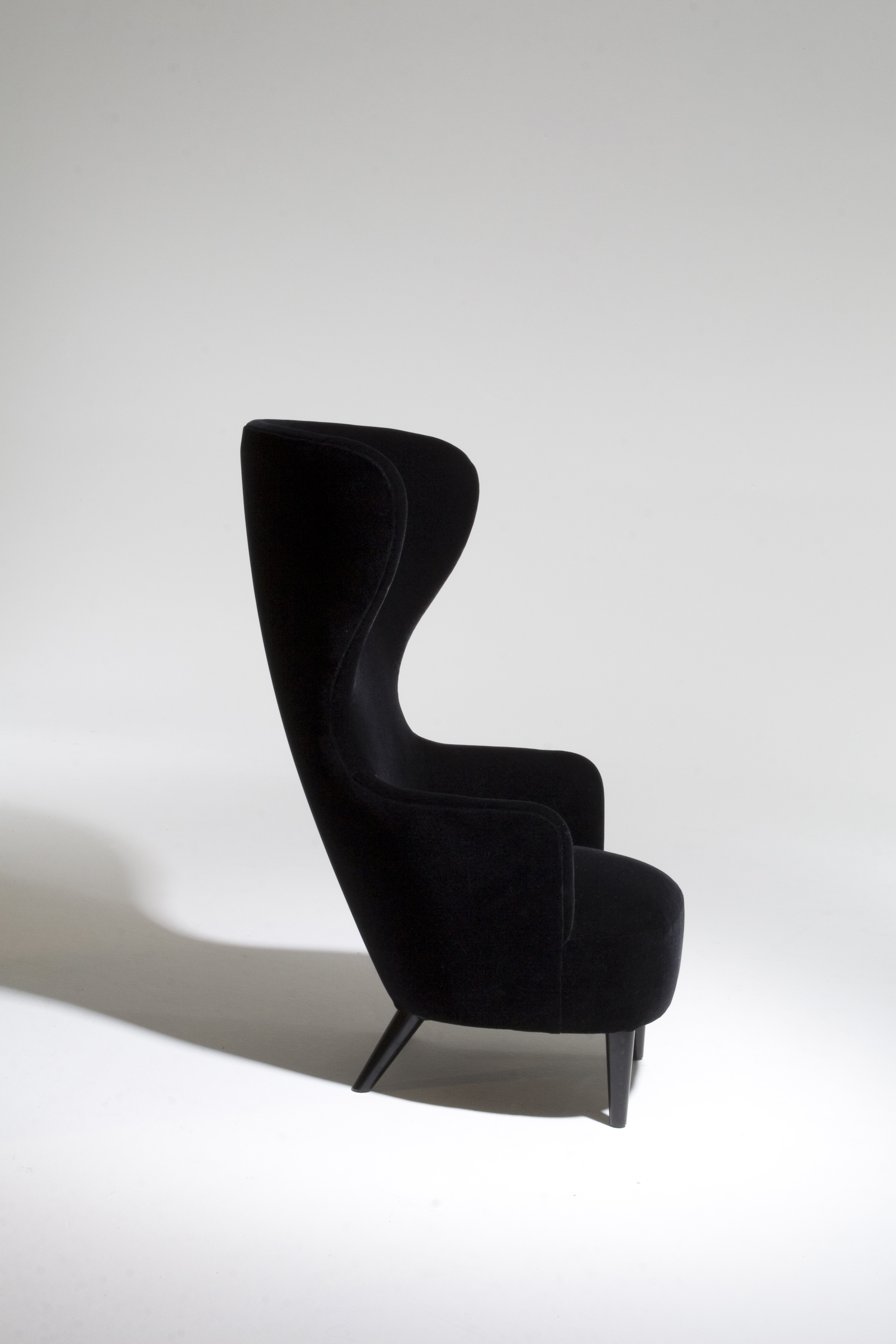
Wingback chair for George Smith

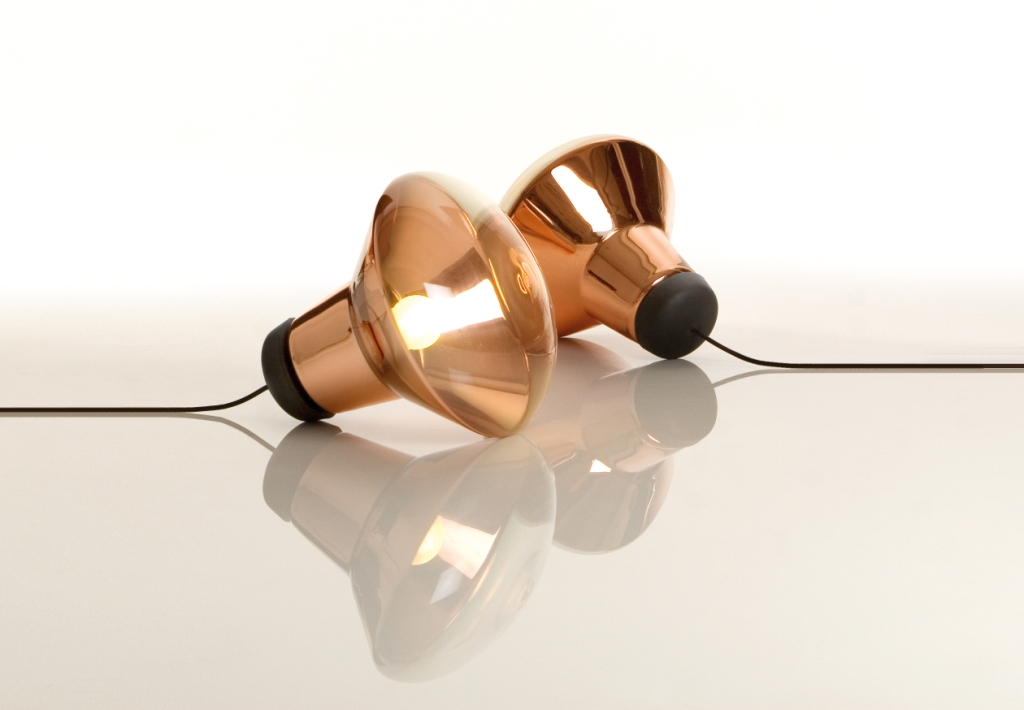
Copper Blow light

== Awards and recognition ==
In 2001 Dixon was appointed an OBE for services to British Design.

He holds Honorary Doctorates from Birmingham City University (2004) and University of the Arts London (2007).

Dixon was named "Designer of The Year" at Maison&Objet, Paris, in 2014.

In 2019 he won the silver award at the Chelsea Flower Show, and the London Design Medal at the London Design Festival.

He was made a CBE in King Charles III's 2025 New Year Honours list.

== Publications and further reading ==
- Tom Dixon. Phaidon Press. 1991. ISBN 978-1-85454-842-9.
- 1000 Chairs. Taschen. 1997. p. 595. ISBN 978-3-8228-7965-8.
- The Interior World of Tom Dixon. Octopus Publishing Group. 2008. ISBN 978-1-84091-519-8.
- Tom Dixon: Minimum Design. 24 Ore Cultura. 2011. ISBN 978-88-6648-003-7.
- Dixonary. Violette Editions. 2013. ISBN 978-1-900828-42-0.
- The Product Design 100. Design Burger. 2026. pp. 80–81. ISBN 978-1-0369-5572-4.
