= Michael Young (industrial designer) =

British artist and designer (born 1966)

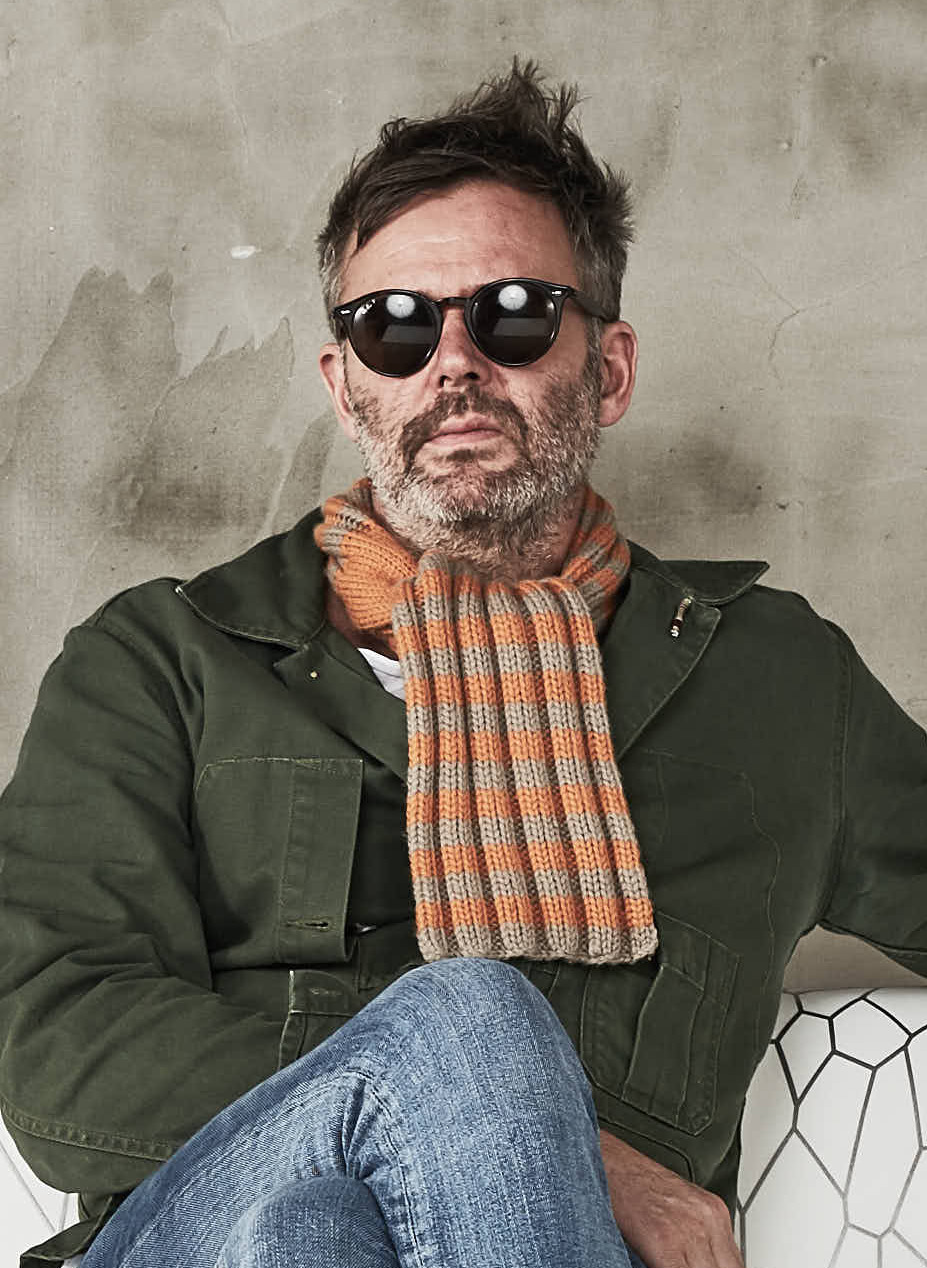
- Young in 2018
- Born: 23 August 1966; City of Sunderland, Sunderland
- Alma mater: Kingston University
- Occupation: Industrial designer, designer, product designer, creative director, visual artist
- Works: Moke
- Awards: Good Design Award; Red Dot Design Award; iF product design award
- Website: michael-young.com

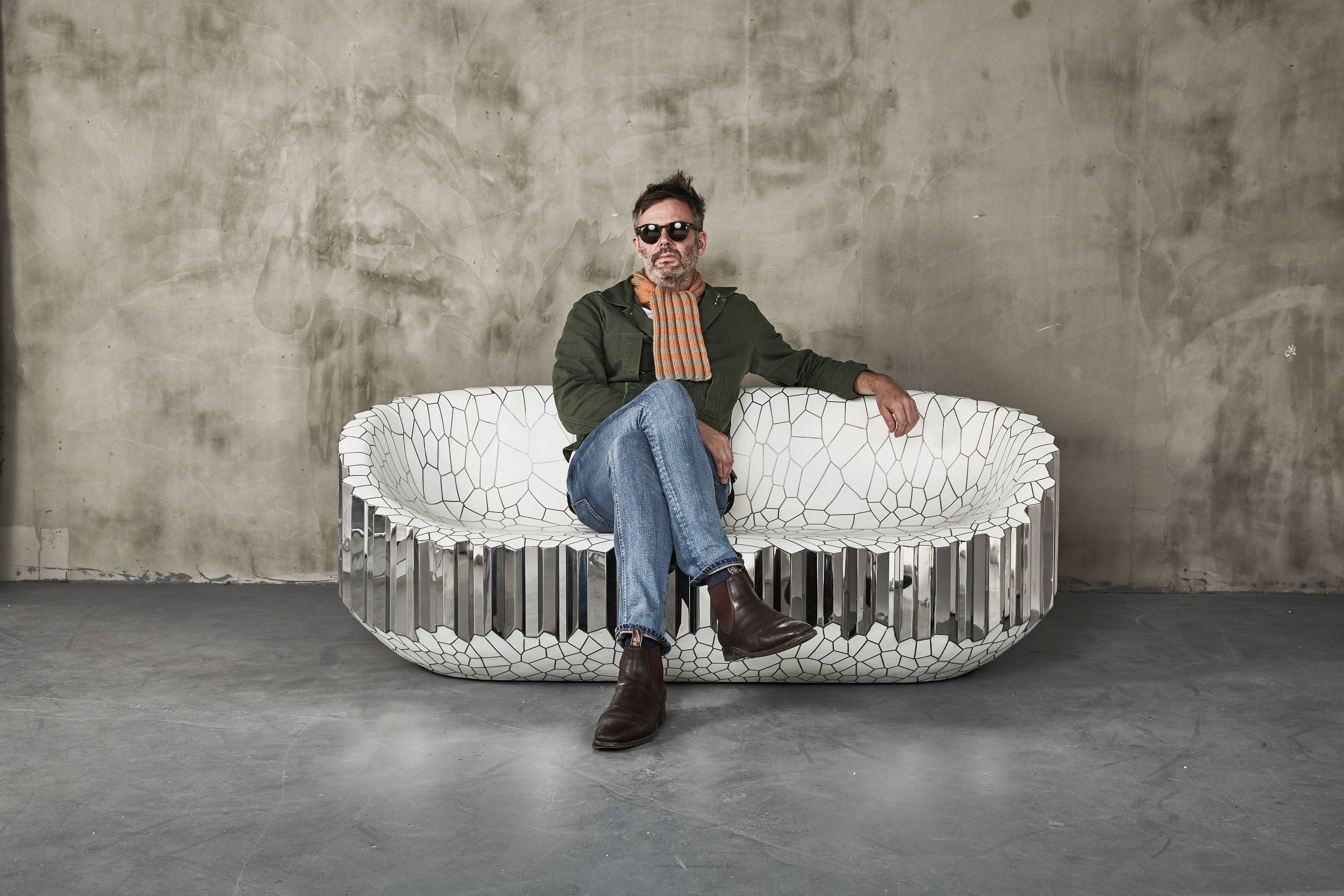
MY Sofa, Gallery ALL (2018)

Michael Young (born 23 August 1966) is a British industrial designer and creative director with offices in Hong Kong, Tokyo, and Milan. He works in the areas of product, furniture and interior design with studios in Hong Kong and Brussels. He is known for unconventional use of materials and manufacturing processes, and collaborations with brands such as Brionvega, Cappellini, KEF, La Manufacture, and MOKE International. He is interested in "how disruption in society always has a design response, because it usually creates a need for things that perform."

== Life and career ==
Young was born in Sunderland, England. He studied at Kingston University and graduated in 1993. Early in his career, he worked with the designer Tom Dixon in London. A grant from the Crafts Council in 1994 enabled him to produce his first collection. In 1997 he was selected by Sir Terrance Conran as the "Most Inspirational British Designer".

In 1994 he started his own studio and operated in England, Iceland, Taiwan before settling in Hong Kong in 2006 to avoid becoming a "European design casualty, wandering from trade fair to trade fair." Young has been the creative director for 100% Design Shanghai (2010, 2011, 2012), prior to which he was the creative director for 100% Design Tokyo (2008), and creative director of the Asian Aerospace show (2009). He is a frequent public speaker, panellist, and design award jury member.

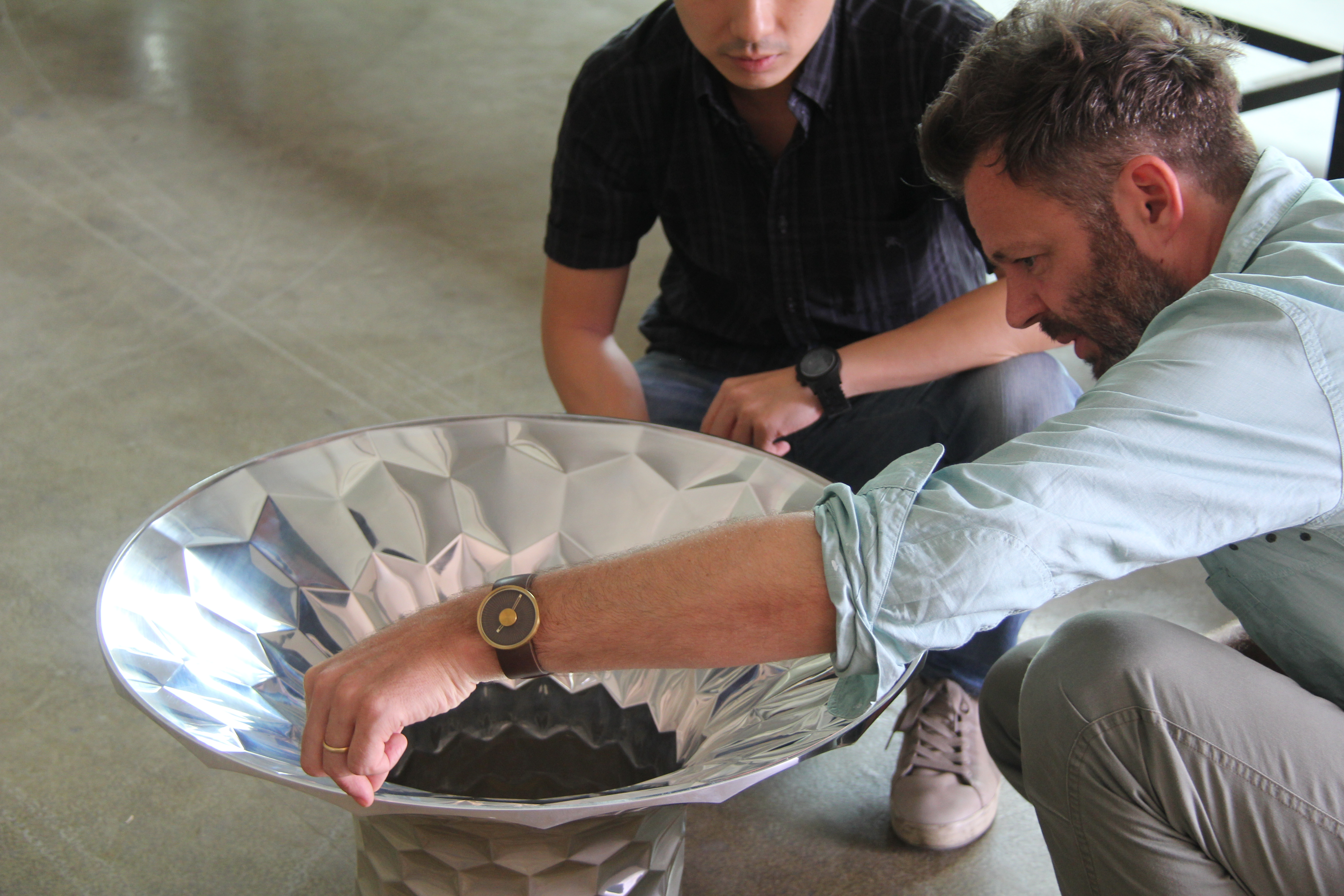
Hex table prototype verification (2014)

Young has designed a wide variety of objects such as headphones, glassware, watches, bicycles, furniture, lighting, suitcases, as well as limited edition experimental furniture. He is interested in combining design with technical abilities of the local industry and often works directly with Chinese manufacturers and industrialists. Throughout his career, he worked with clients such as Bacardi, Brionvega, Cappellini, Cathay Pacific, Coalesse, Coca-Cola, CS Rugs, Emeco, Giant Bicycles, Gufram, M2O, Magis, Georg Jensen, KEF, Trussardi, Schneider Electric, Steelcase, Swedese, and WonderGlass. The historian and curator Maria Cristina Didero described "his continuous testing of new technologies to push boundaries" as "a means [...] not an end", saying that "Michael is special in everything he does."

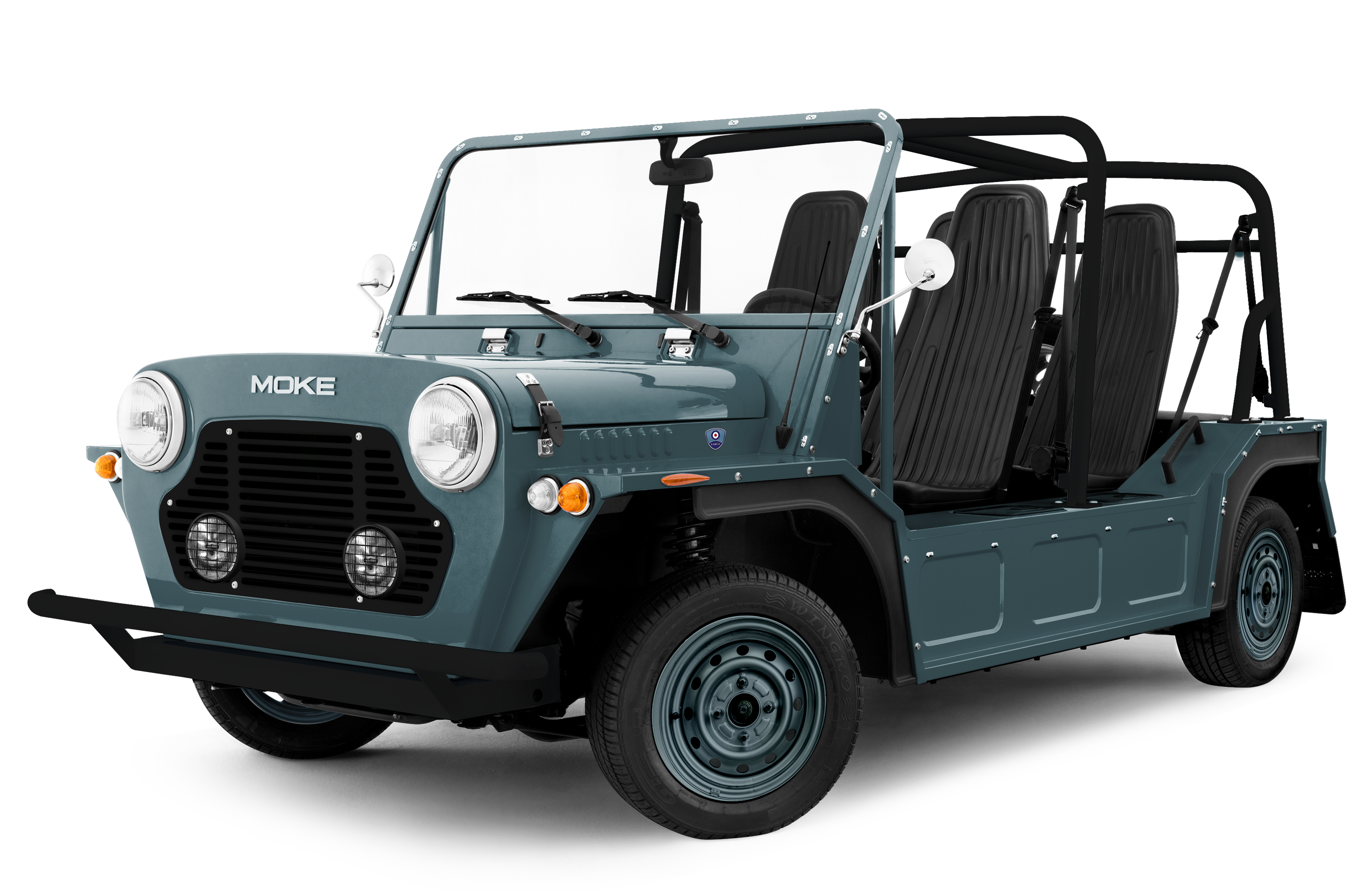
MOKE recreational vehicle designed by Young (c. 2022)

In 2012, Young was approached by Chery subsidiary MOKE International to design a 21st-century version of the Moke (styled MOKE). Young has said he considered this project a "call of duty". In 2018 Young re-engineered a continuation model, which is also used as the basis for the Electric Moke.

His work has been exhibited the Design Museum in London, the Pompidou Centre, and the Louvre Museum in Paris, as well as in solo exhibitions in Kyoto, Miami, Hong Kong, Milan, Paris, and at Belgium's Grand-Hornu—which hosted his 2016 exhibition called Al(l) Projects with Aluminum at the Centre d'Innovation et de Design (presented by Maria Cristina Didero). His work also was included in Didero's 2016 exhibition called Friends+Design at the Dresden Kunstgewerbemuseum. The show was co-curated by Tulga Beyerle and featured works by Tomás Alonso, Mathias Hahn, Richard Hutten, Philippe Malouin, Jerszy Seymour, and Bethan Laura Wood working together on specially commissioned pieces that, according to Didero, "testify to the time, the affection and the trust that form the bond between ... very different people."

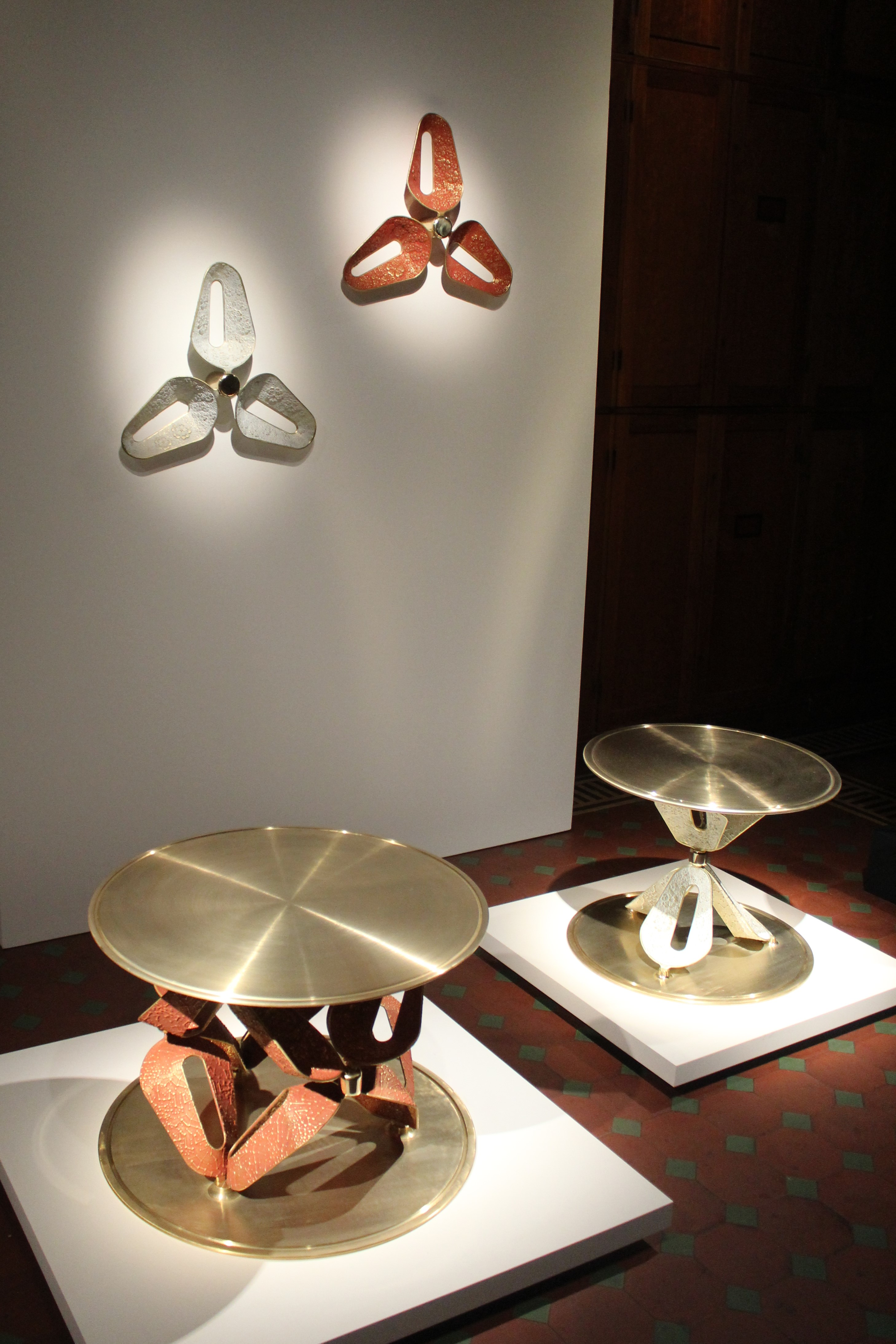
Blossom Links by Nambu Tekki, Prince Consort Gallery, V&A (2024)

In 2024, Young's collaboration with Japanese master craftsmen Nambu Tekki was included in an exhibition at Kudan House in Tokyo called Craft x Tech Tohoku Project (also curated by Didero). The work, titled Blossom Links, was described as an exploration of "heritage and contemporary technology [with a] history dating back centuries", the pieces in the exhibition seek to "[bring] Japan’s traditional crafts to a new, contemporary audience." The show included works by Sabine Marcelis, Studio Swine, Ini Archibong, Yoichi Ochiai, and Hideki Yoshimoto. The work was subsequently exhibited at Design Miami Art Basel, and then at the V&A's Prince Consort Gallery during the London Design Festival.

Also in 2024, Young's extruded aluminium Totem light sculptures were exhibited at Gallery ALL in Shanghai.

In 2025 he released a collection of 3D printed titanium eyewear.

== Legacy ==
Pieces designed by Young are in the collection of the Design Museum and the V&A in London, the San Francisco Museum of Modern Art, and the M+ museum in Hong Kong, which includes 14 of his works.

The Hanger Tree by Katrin Olina Petursdottir and Michael Young was featured on a series of Icelandic postage stamps celebrating contemporary design.

== Personal life ==
Young has spoken openly about growing up with dyslexia and how this impacted his education and career, stating "Dyslexia very much prevented me from becoming an academic. Every day in class I was left in my own imagination. I didn't really absorb any information from mathematics, English, geography, history […] I made my own universe and kind of built my own way."

He has 3 sons, Freddy Mars, Jasper Wilde, and Ruben Michael.

== Awards ==
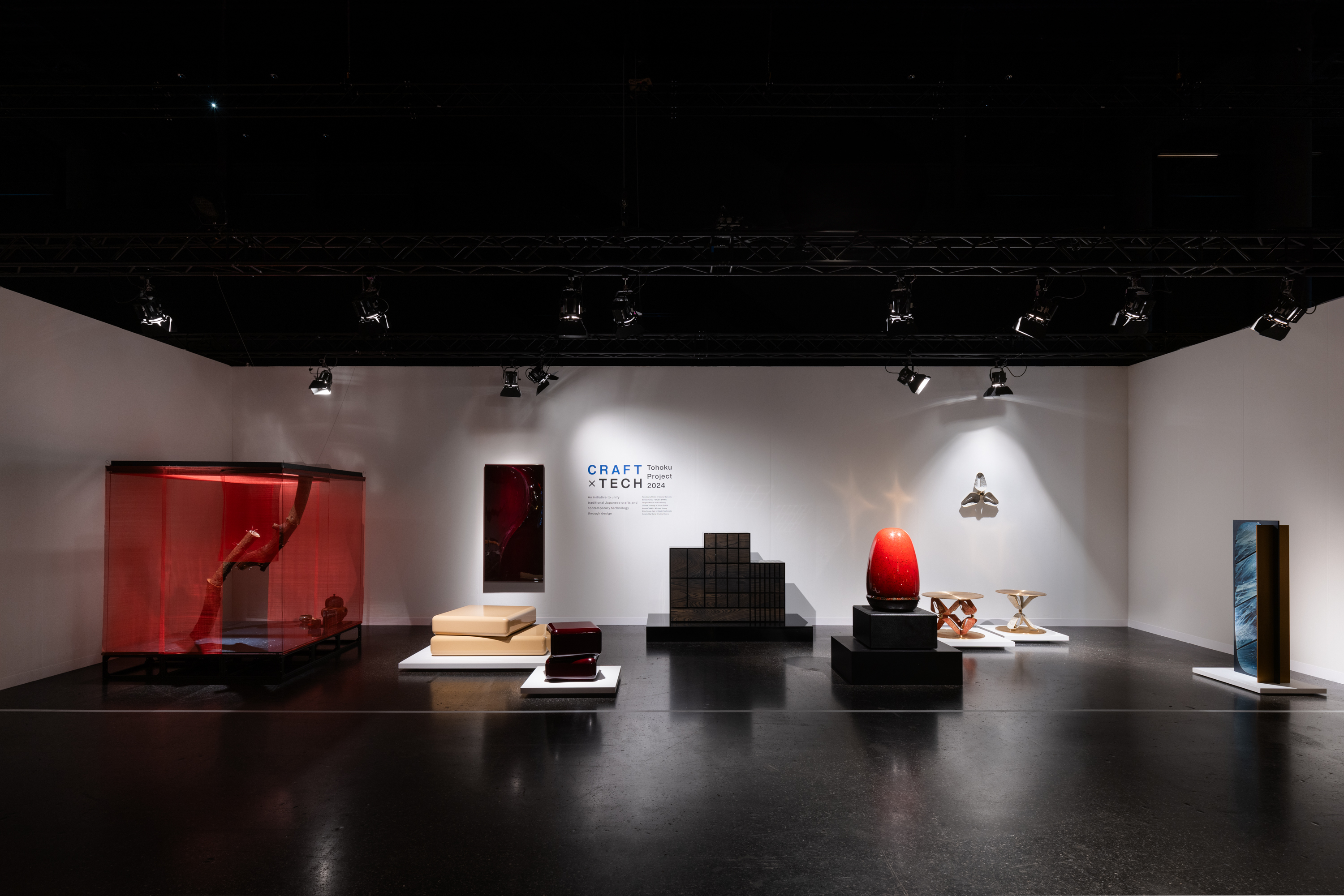
Craft x Tech Tohoku Project at Design Miami Art Basel (2024)

- 2008 Winner of Eurobike Awards
- 2009 Best of dining chair by Wallpaper Design Award
- 2009 Red Dot Award
- 2010 Red Dot Award
- 2011 Japanese Good Design Award
- 2012 Red Dot Design Award, Oregon Scientific RA9000
- 2014 Silver Award at the 2014 NeoCon World's Trade Fair for the LessThanFive chair, manufactured by Coalesse
- 2013 D&AD Award, Product Design, EOQ
- 2015 Red Dot Design Award, Winner, TST Sofa
- 2016 Red Dot Design Award, Winner, Jougor MY Faucet
- 2017 iF Design Award, Gold Award, Master Series Michael Young Watch
- 2017 iF Design Award, Gold Award, LessThanFive Chair
- 2017 Good Design Award, Gold Winner, Clipsal Iconic
- 2017 Red Dot Design Award, Winner, LessThanFive Chair
- 2019 Design Anthology Awards, Finalists, Templates Watch
- 2019 German Design Award, Winner, Templates Watch
- 2022 Good Design Award, Winner, Omura Series X
- 2022 Design Guild Mark Award, Joseph Collection for EOQ
- 2024 DESIGN MIAMI.BASEL Best Curio Presentation: Craft x Tech

== Publications ==
- Al(l) Projects in Aluminium by Michael Young (Stichting Kunstboak, 2016). Borka, Max; Chen, Aric; Didero, Maria Cristina; Pok, Marie. ISBN 978-90-5856-540-2.
- 100 Best Bikes (Laurence King Publishing, 2012) ISBN 978-1-78067-396-7.
- Works in China by John Heskett (2011)
- 1000 New Designs and Where to Find Them (Laurence King Publishing, 2010) ISBN 1-85669-466-6.
- The International Design Yearbook (Laurence King Publishing, 2007) ISBN 978-1-85669-516-9.
- Design Now! (TACHEN, 2007) ISBN 978-3-8228-5267-5.
- Desire, the Shape of Things to Come (Gastalen, 2008) ISBN 978-3-89955-218-8.
- Modern Furniture, 150 Years of Design (Trandem Verlag GmbH, 2009; H.F. Ullmann. 2012) ISBN 978-3-8480-0030-2

== Gallery ==
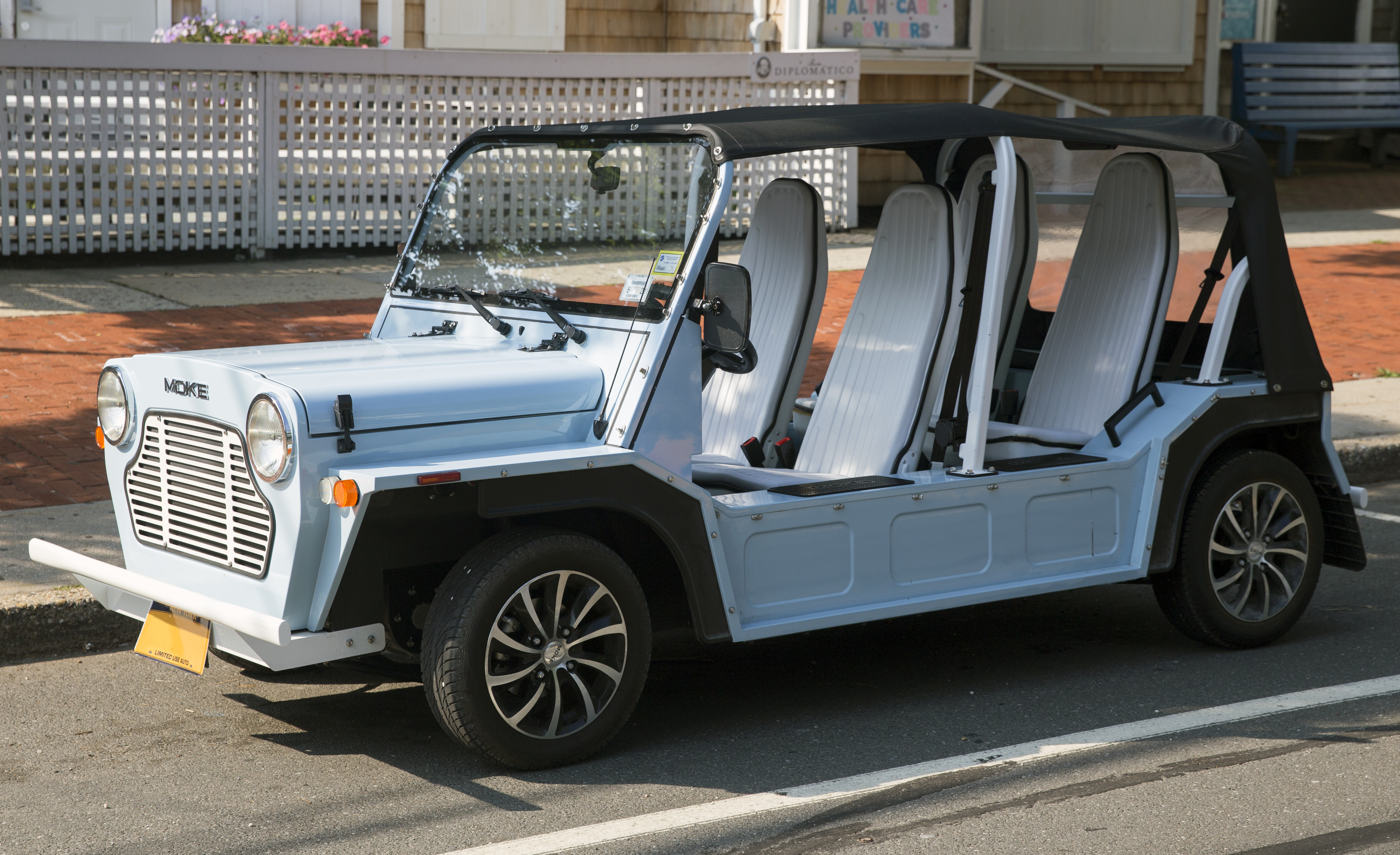
2019 Moke America eMoke, front left (Amagansett)

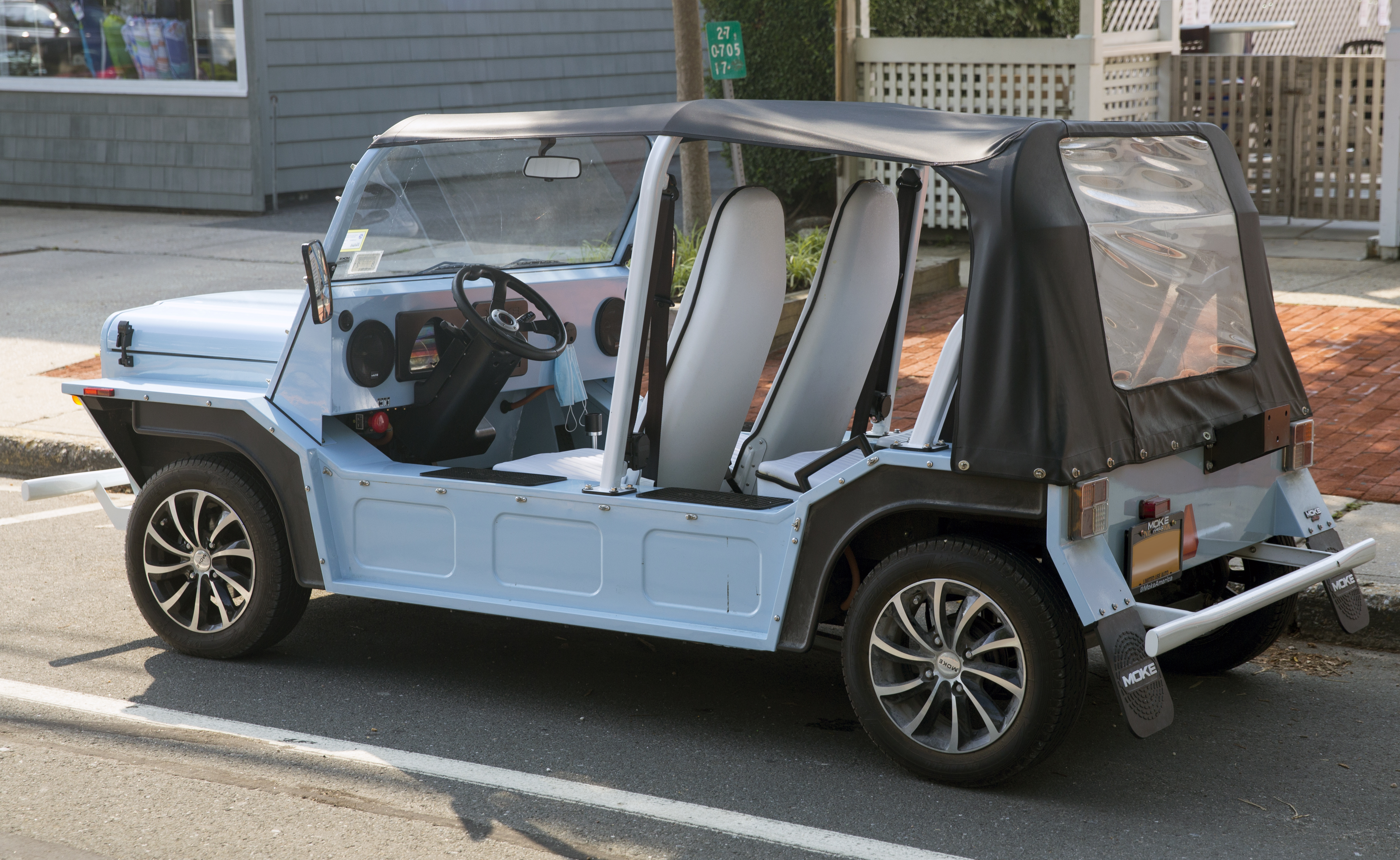
2019 Moke America eMoke, rear left (Amagansett)

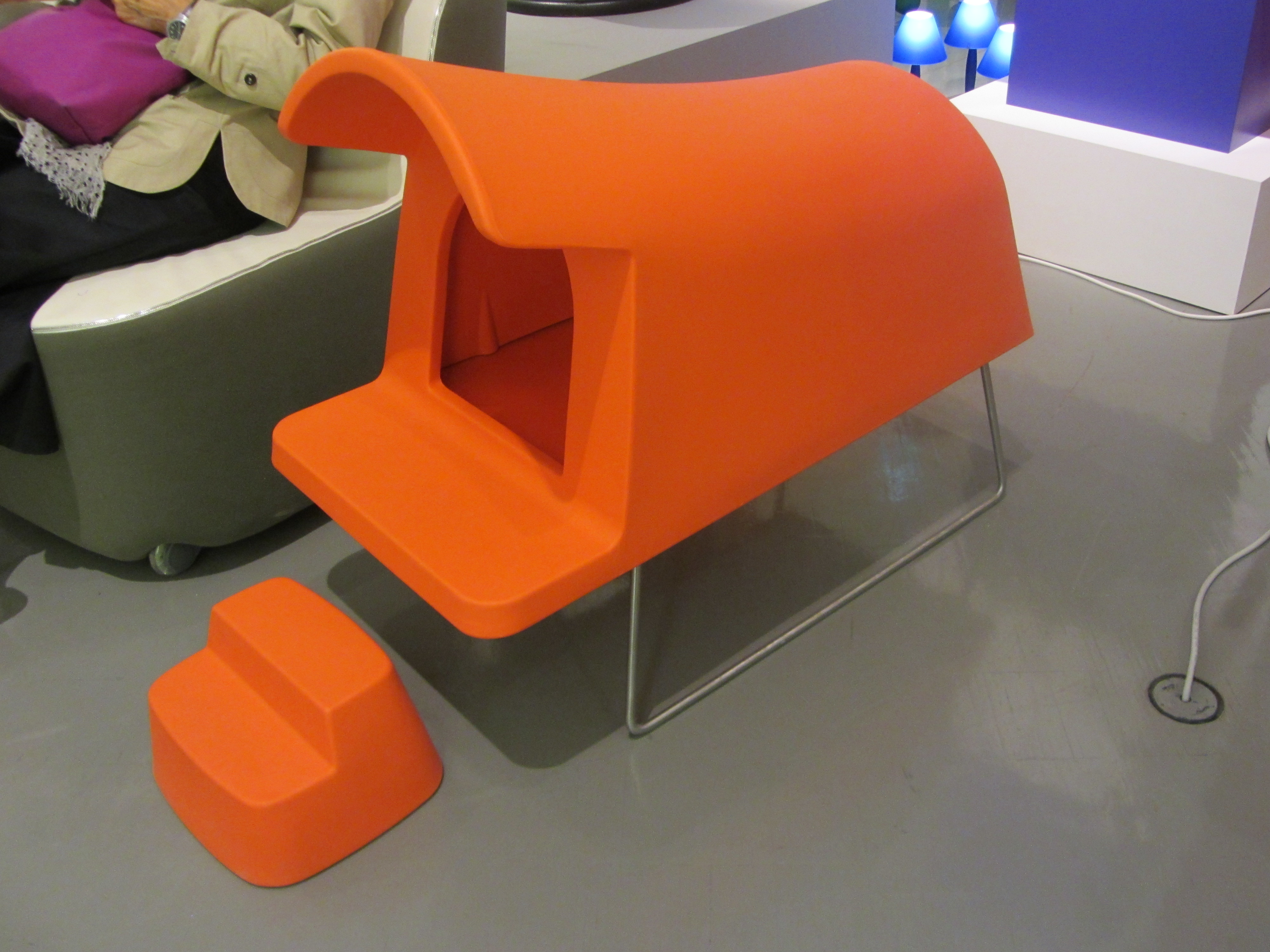
Dog House – Magis – Michael Young 1

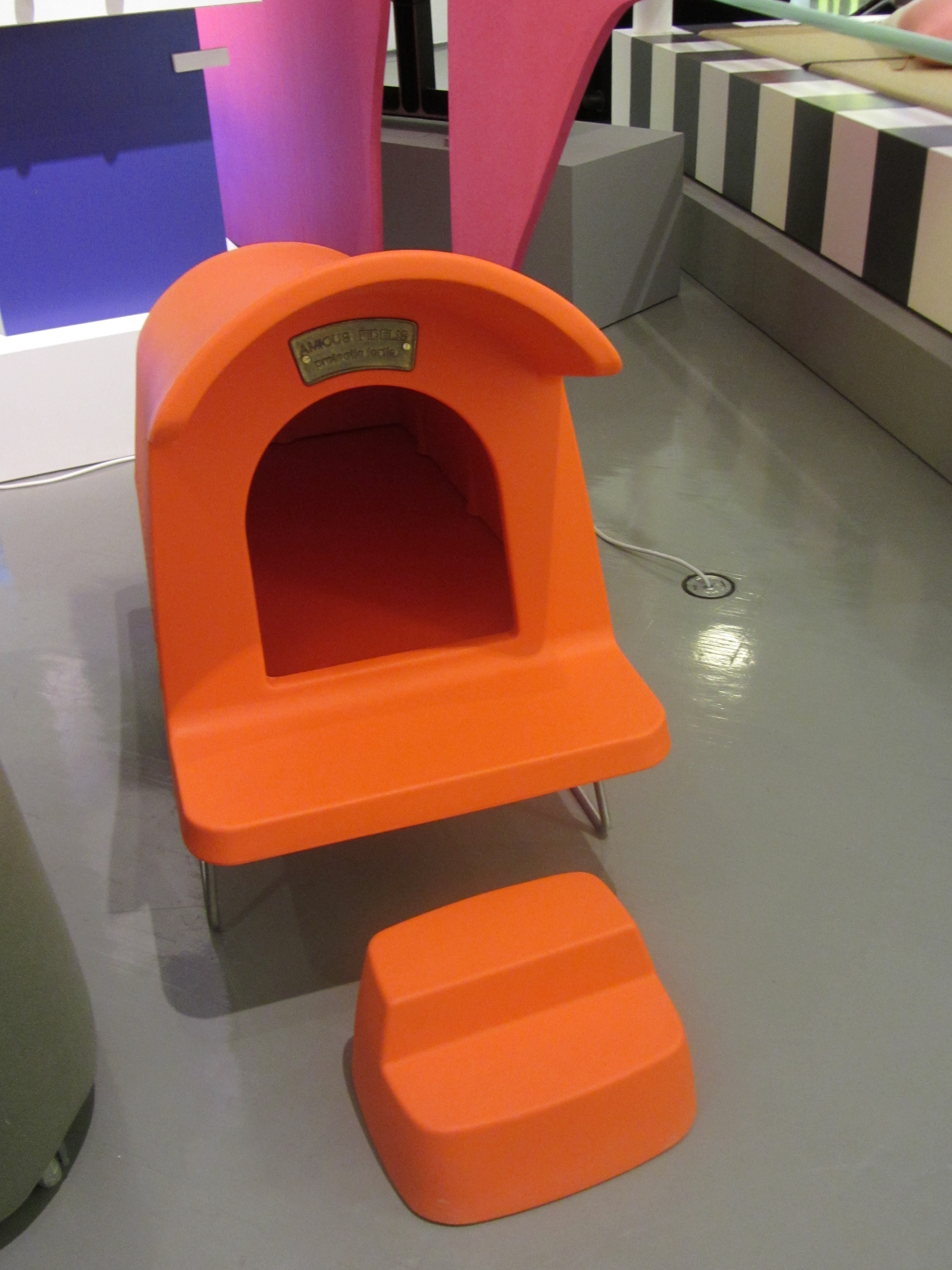
Dog House – Magis – Michael Young 2

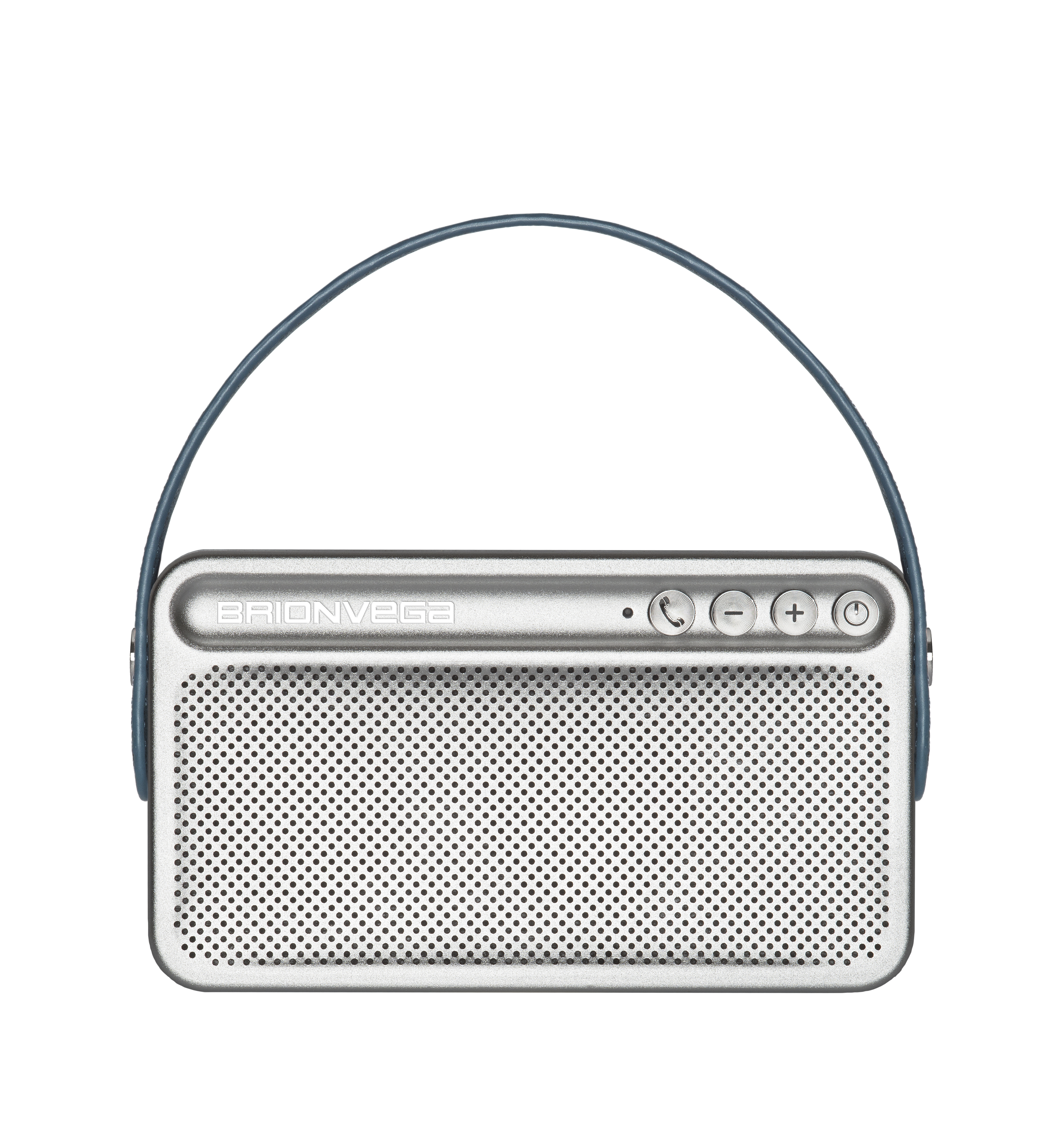
Brionvega WearIT TS217 bluetooth speaker

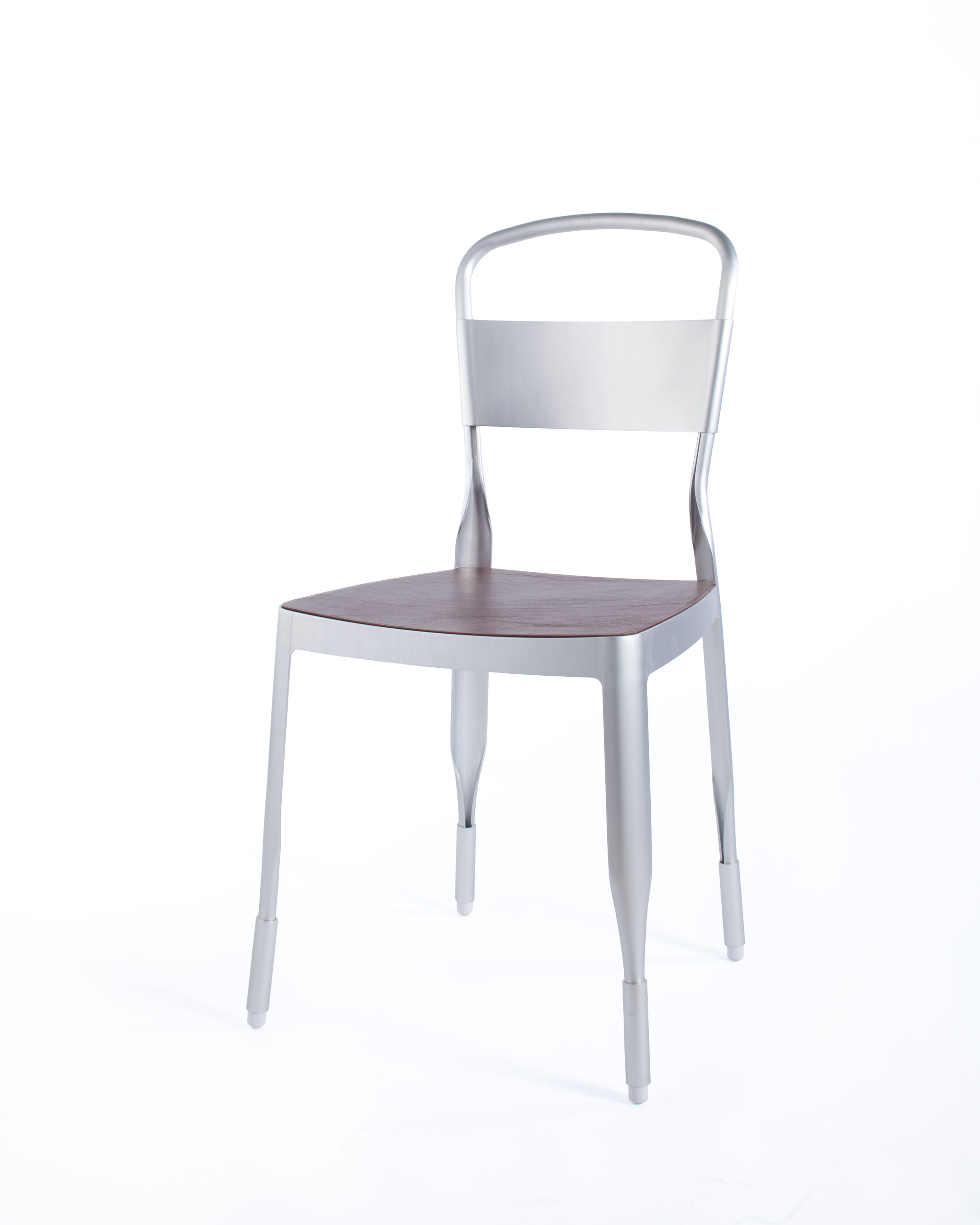
Chair-4a for Works in China collection (2009)

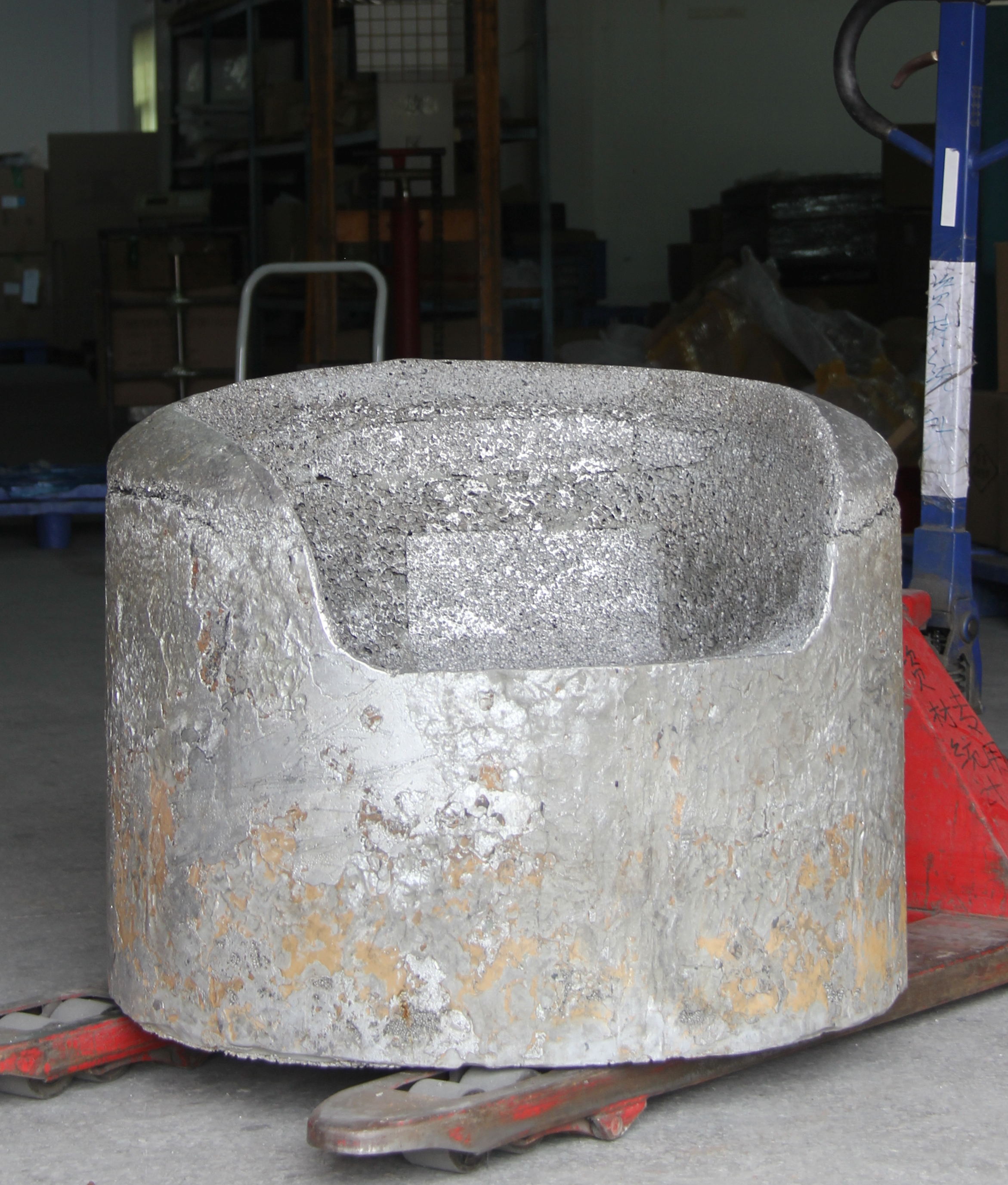
MYS Oxygen Chair prep 2 2014

MY Coalesse lessthanfive Sanding1

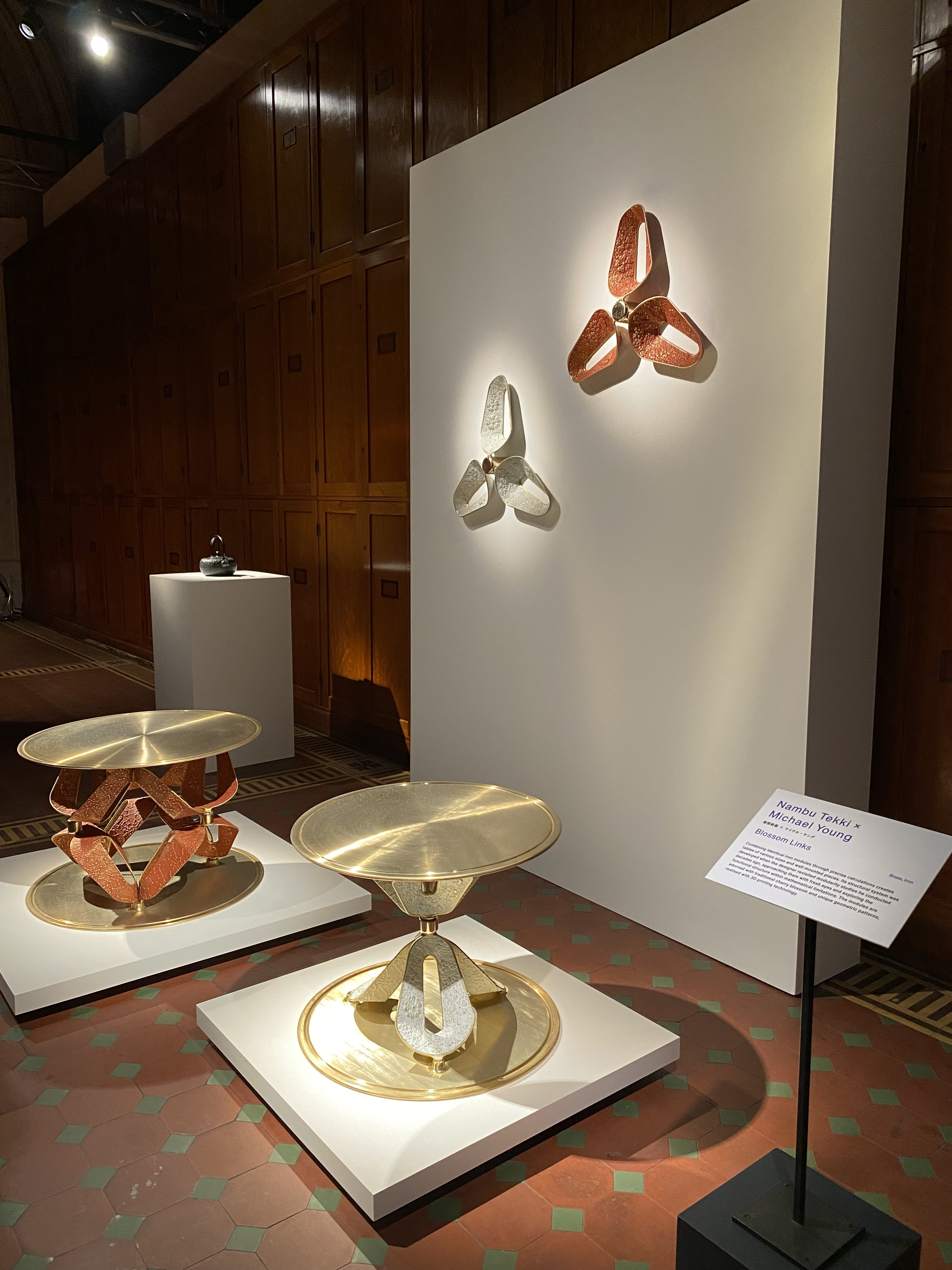
Nambu Tekki by Michael Young – Blossom Links

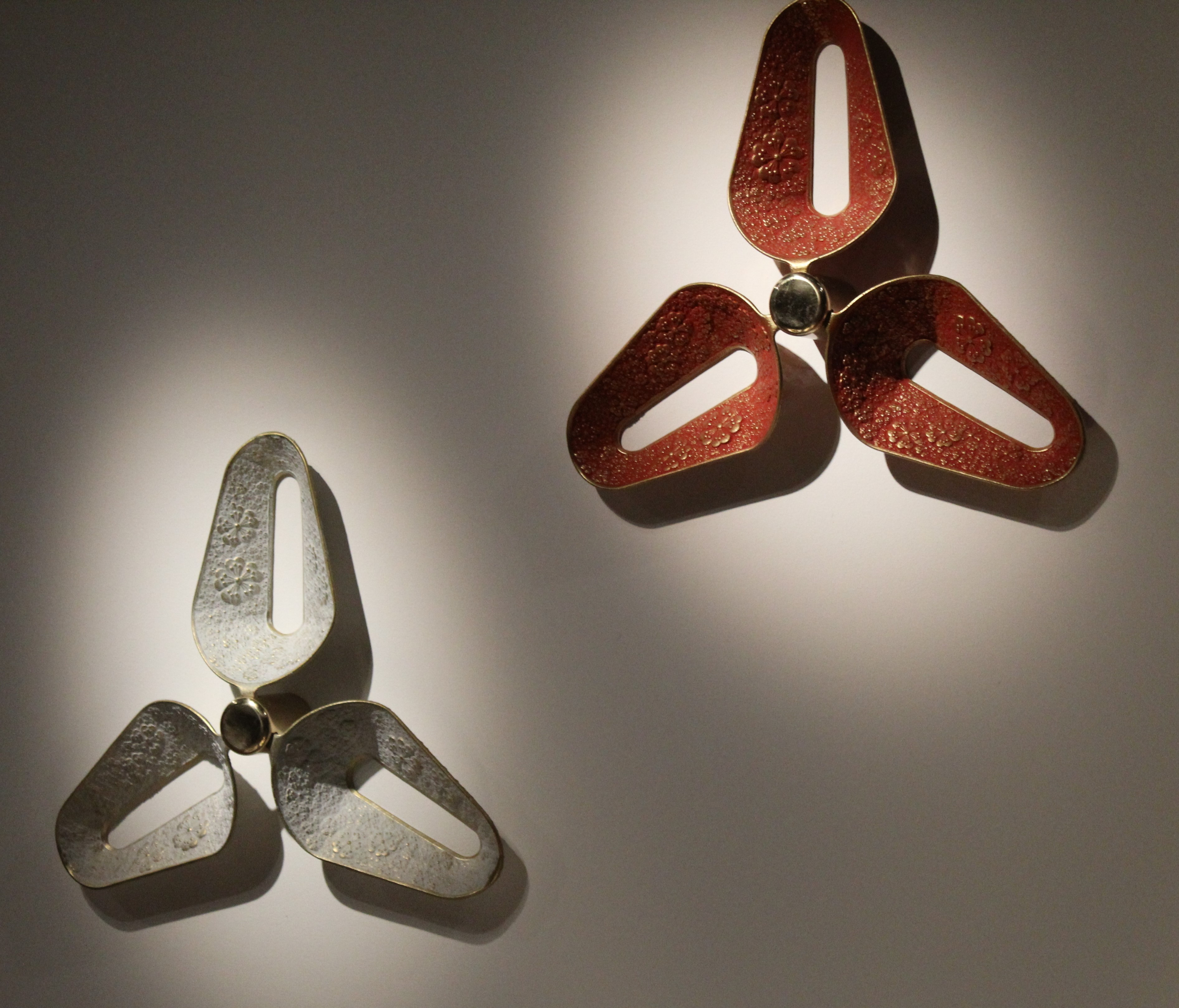
Blossom Links by Nambu Tekki x Michael Young
