= Funkapolitan =

Britfunk band

- Origin: London
- Genres: Britfunk
- Years active: 1980–82
- Labels: London
- Past members: Nick Jones; Toby Andersen; Kadir Guirey; Sagat Guirey; Guy Pratt; Simon Olivierre; Tom Dixon; Greg Craig; Doria Craig Terry President

Funkapolitan was a British soul band active in the 1980s.

== Overview ==
The band was formed in 1980, by lyricist Nick Jones and musician Toby Andersen, in Andersen's bathroom, where he kept a Vox organ, with the aim of "forming a hard funk outfit which would render current disco obsolete." Jones and Andersen chose the name by portmanteauing the band Funkadelic and the magazine Cosmopolitan. Percussionist Greg and backing dancer Doria Craig were siblings of Mikey Craig of Culture Club, and guitarists Kadir and Sagat Guirey were White Russian royalty.

The band's first gig was at Kensington Market later in the year and, with the band earning high-profile support slots with The Clash and Simple Minds, as well as coverage from Peter York in Harpers & Queen, the band signed to London Records, which teamed them with August Darnell as producer, and Roxy Music stylist Antony Price as tailor.

The band's first single, "As Time Goes By", penned by Andersen and Jones, was released in July 1981. In September, despite the single only being at number 47 in the UK Singles Chart, the band was invited to perform the playout on Top Of The Pops, although the publicity was not enough to send the single into the top 40.

London released two more singles and a self-titled album in 1982, but none reached the charts, and the band broke up. Two members formed Loansharks and bassist Tom Dixon became an industrial designer who was awarded the MBE. Andersen continued as a songwriter and co-wrote all of the tracks on the Curiosity Killed The Cat album Keep Your Distance.

== Discography ==
=== Albums ===
- Funkapolitan, 1982

=== Singles ===
Year	Single	Peak chart positions
Year	Single	UK
1981	"As Time Goes By"	41
1982	"In The Crime Of Life"	–
1982	"Run Run Run"	–
"—" denotes releases that did not chart.
