= Shiro Kuramata =

Japanese artist and designer (1934–1991)

- Born: 29 November 1934
- Died: 1 February 1991 (aged 56)
- Occupations: Designer, furniture designer, interior architect
- Website: e-daylight.jp/interior/designers/shiro-kuramata/

Shiro Kuramata (倉俣 史朗, 29 November 1934 – 1 February 1991) is one of Japan's most important designers of the 20th century.

== Biography ==
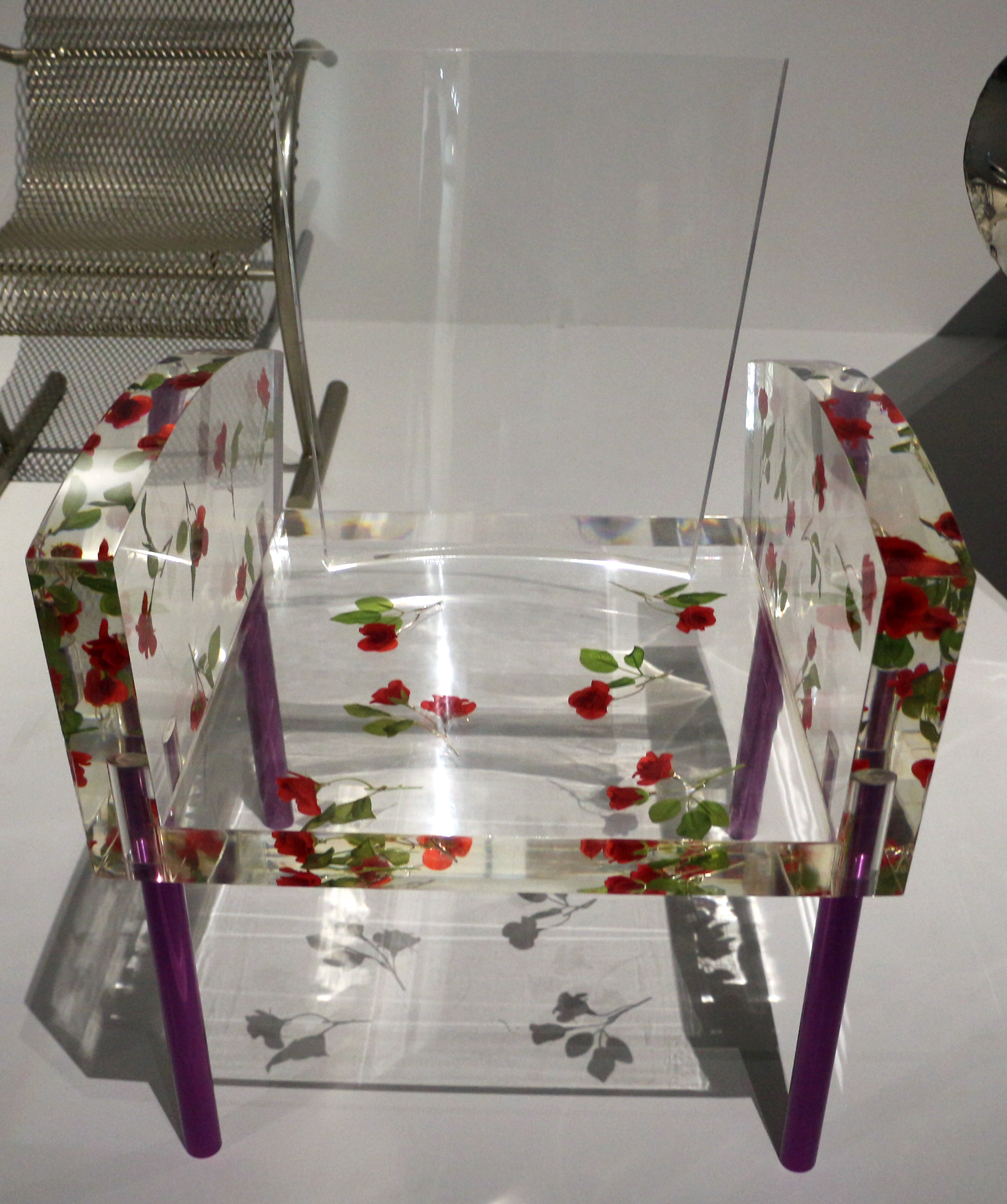
Miss Blanche chair by Kuramata, 1988, in the collections of many museums such as the Museum of Modern Art in New York and San Francisco Museum of Modern Art.

Kuramata was born in 1934. He was part of a generation of Japanese creatives born just before the outbreak of Second World War, who are considered to have transformed the way Japan was viewed by the outside world.

This generation included Kuramata's friends and collaborators who were famous members of the Japanese design and architecture circle at the time, including Issey Miyake, Yokoo Tadanori, Isozaki Arata, and Tadao Ando.

Kuramata studied architecture at the Tokyo Technical College before 1953 and was trained as a cabinet maker at the Kuwasawa Institute of Design in Tokyo in 1954, after which he worked for multiple companies such as the furniture producer Teikoku. In 1965, he established Kuramata Design Office in Tokyo and in 1981 received the Japanese Cultural Prize for design. From the mid‑1960s onwards, Kuramata began exploring materials and forms through his unique designs. His work merged popular culture, Japanese aesthetic concepts, and the Western avant‑garde.

In 1981 Kuramata was invited by Ettore Sottsass to be a founding member of the Italian design collaborative Memphis Group.

In 1990 the French government awarded Kuramata the distinguished Ordre des Arts et des Lettres in recognition of his outstanding contribution to art and design.

== Works ==
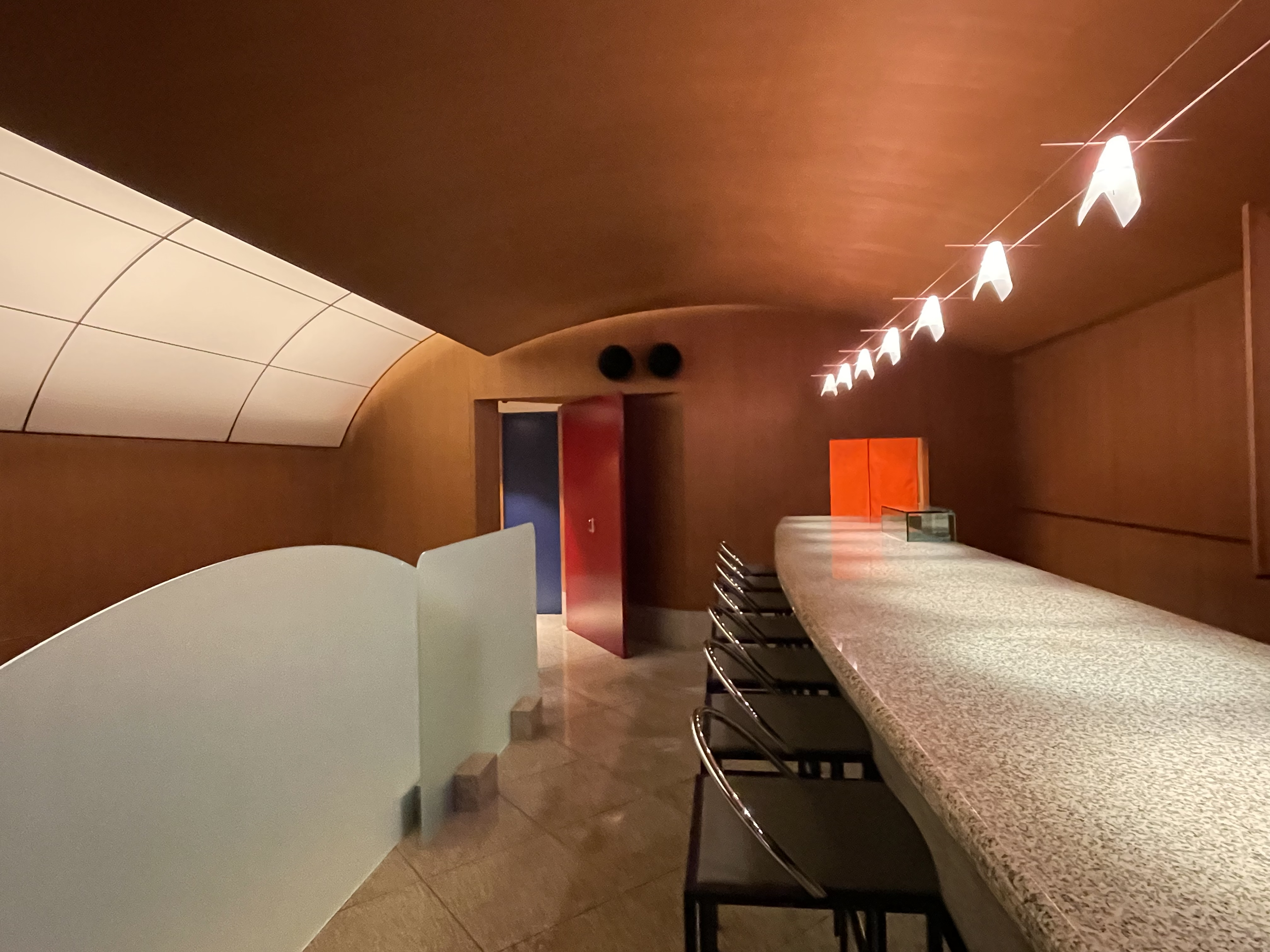
Kiyotomo Sushi Bar at M+, 2021

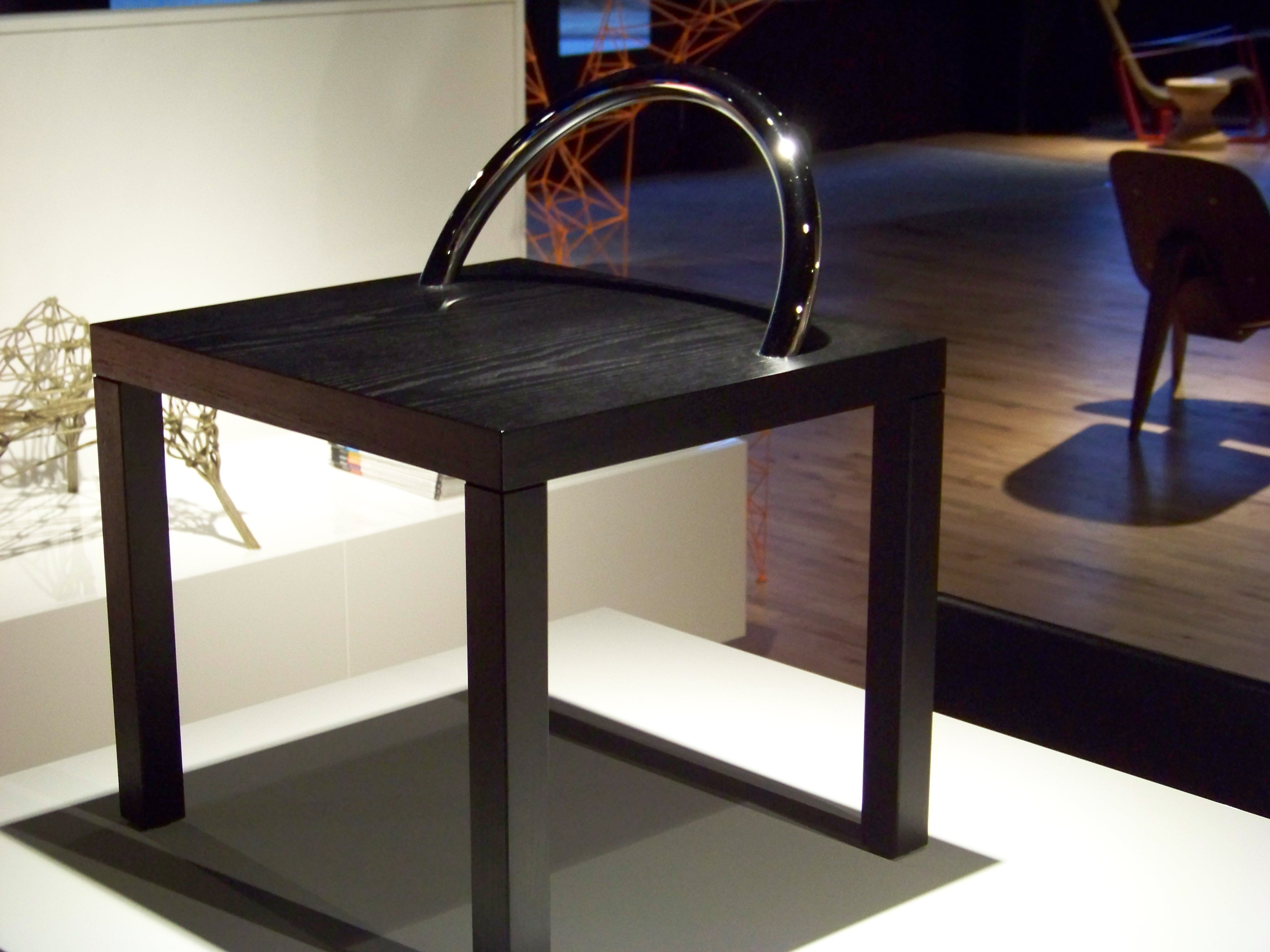
Table-chair

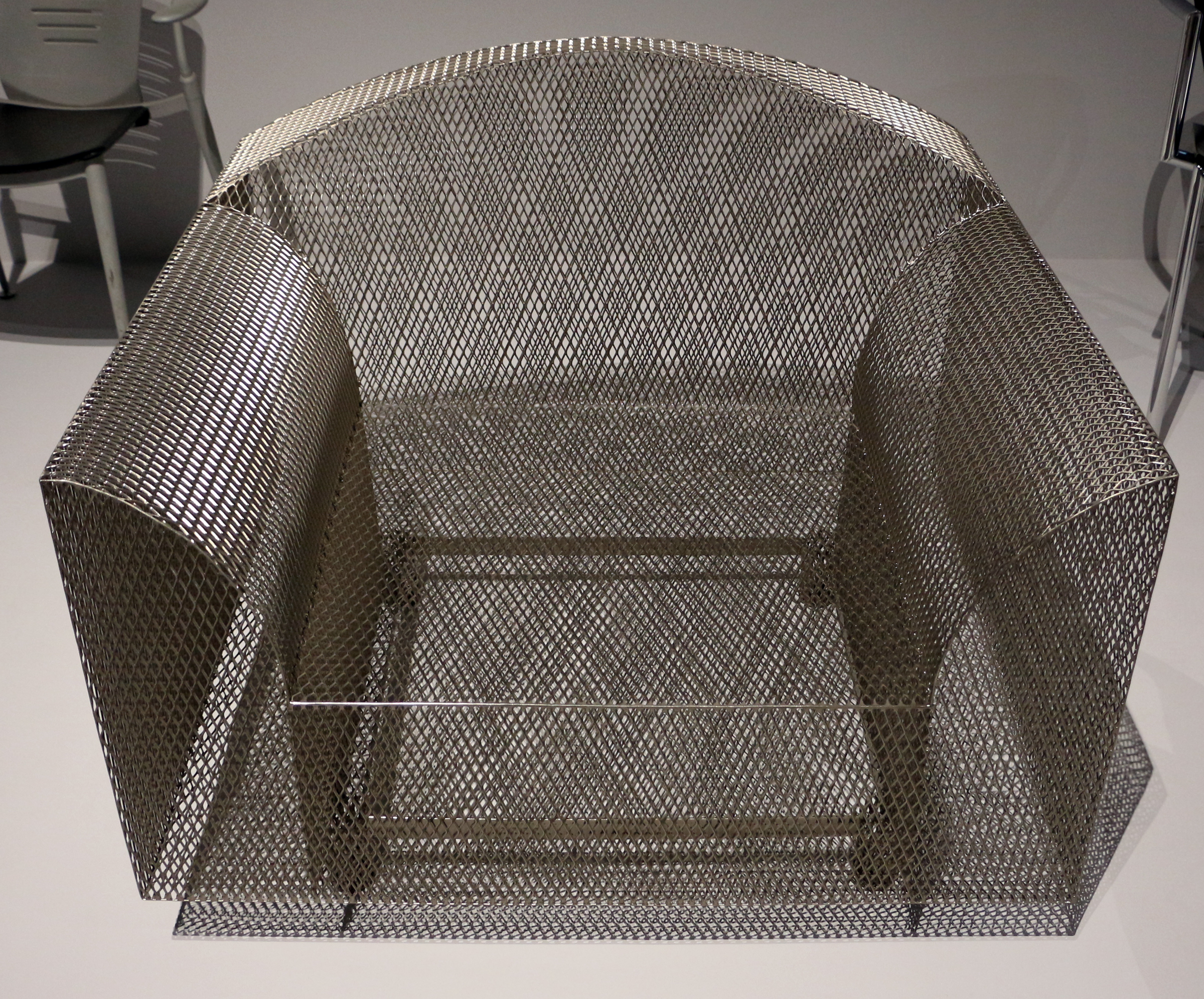
How High the Moon, 1986–1987

Cappellini Progetti Compiuti by Shiro Kuramata, 1970

Kuramata was mainly known for his use of industrial materials such as wire steel mesh and plexiglass to create architectural interiors and furniture. Revolutionary pieces such as the "How High the Moon" chair (1986)] reflect the emerging dynamism and maturing creativity of postwar Japan, or his Ikebana, lead crystal free hand blown vase, realized by the Vilca from Colle di Val d'Elsa (province of Siena, Italy), an example of fusion between oriental and occidental cultures.

Kuramata's "Miss Blanche" chair from 1988 is one of his most iconic works, named after the central female character in Tennessee Williams's drama A Streetcar Named Desire and inspired by corsage worn by Vivien Leigh in the film adaptation. As reference to the dreamlike world of illusion in which Blanche lives, the roses were poured by hand into a mold with liquid acrylic resin. The appearance of transparency and airiness contrasts sharply to the fact that the chair weighs at seventy kilos, as a result of the acrylic glass. An edition of this chair was sold at Christie's in London for GBP 46,000.00 (USD 86,000.00) in October 1997, lot 108.

A "How High the Moon" two seater was sold for GBP 12,650.00 (US$24,000.00) at Bonhams London in May 1998. This ranks Kuramata amongst the most desirable of artists/designers of the 20th century. Kuramata's many works can be found in the permanent collections of museums around the world, such as the Museum of Fine Arts in Boston, Hara Museum of Contemporary Art in Tokyo, the Metropolitan Museum of Art in New York, and Philadelphia Museum of Art.

Kuramata's architecture and interior designs are less well known as there are few remaining examples. Some of his most visually striking interiors were designed for Issey Miyake's boutique shops. He designed multiple sushi restaurants in Tokyo. One of these, the Kiyomoto Sushi Bar, was collected in its entirety by British collector Richard Schlagman. It now sits in the collection of M+ in Hong Kong.

== Bibliography ==
- Seki, Yasuko. Kuramata Shiro Ettore Sottsass. Tokyo: 21_21 Design Sight, 2010. | ISBN 9784903348216
- Kuramata, Shiro. Shiro Kuramata 1934–1991. Tokyo: Hara Museum of Contemporary Art, 1996.
- Sudjic, Deyan. Shiro Kuramata. London; New York, NY: Phaidon, 2013. | ISBN 9780714845005
- Picchi, Francesca, and Todd Eberle with essays by Tadao Ando, John Pawson and Issey Miyake. Kuramata's Tokyo. Domus, no. 858, April 2003.

== Sources ==
- Exhibition information from the San Francisco Museum of Modern Art.
- Shiro Kuramata at "Paul Hughes Fine Arts".
