= The Clash at Bonds International Casino =

Live album recorded in New York in 981

The Clash performing at Bonds, June 1981. From left to right: Paul Simonon, Joe Strummer, Mick Jones. Unseen: drummer Topper Headon

The Clash played a series of 17 concerts at Bonds International Casino in New York City in May and June 1981 in support of their album Sandinista!. Due to their wide publicity, the concerts became an important moment in the history of the band. Some of the nights were professionally recorded either for CBS records or for FM broadcast. The 9 June performance appears on countless bootleg records and several songs have appeared on From Here to Eternity: Live or other official Clash releases.

The site of the concerts was formerly Bonds department store which had been converted into a large second-floor hall. Promoters kept the name because there was a large Bonds sign on the outside of the building. As The Clash had not yet broken out into mass popularity, eight shows were originally scheduled: 28, 29, 30, 31 May and 1, 2, 3 and 5 June 1981. However, given the venue's legal capacity limit of 1750, the series was blatantly oversold (3500) right from the first night, leading the New York City Fire Department to cancel the Saturday, 30 May performance. In response, the band condemned the brazen greed of the promoters while demonstrating unprecedented integrity to each and every ticketholder by doubling the original booking with a total of 17 dates extending through June.

Strict interpretation of the fire laws meant that audiences were relatively small, resulting in a sense of intimacy between the band and the audience. Audience members clambered onto the stage to join in singalongs. New York musicians, including Pearl Harbor, assisted and overseen by Andy Dunkley, provided disc jockey services as the audience entered and gathered.

The concert captures The Clash on the verge of their major American market breakthrough with the release of Combat Rock a year later. The concert also displayed the band on the cusp between being a cult band and their major market penetration. As always with The Clash, ticket and merchandise prices were set relatively low. Prices were $10 per ticket and $5 per ticket for matinee shows.

The band had a new opening act every night, including The Fall, Grandmaster Flash and the Furious Five, Dead Kennedys, Bad Brains, Kraut, Lee "Scratch" Perry and many more. Of a half dozen or so British bands that were scheduled to appear, only the Slits, Funkapolitan, and the Equators were able to do so. Many of the hip-hop groups that opened were either picketed or booed off the stage, which prompted Joe to chide the audience as soon as The Clash came on stage afterwards. Melle Mel later said that when they tried to perform the section of "Beat Street" with the, "Say Ho!", the audience members would yell, "Fuck you!".

== Setlist ==
1. "London Calling"
2. "Safe European Home"
3. "The Leader"
4. "Train in Vain"
5. "(White Man) In Hammersmith Palais"
6. "This Is Radio Clash"
7. "Corner Soul"
8. "Guns of Brixton"
9. "The Call Up"
10. "Bankrobber"
11. "Complete Control"
12. "Lightning Strikes (Not Once But Twice)"
13. "Ivan Meets GI Joe"
14. "Charlie Don't Surf"
15. "The Magnificent Seven"
16. "Broadway"
17. "Somebody Got Murdered"
18. "Police & Thieves"
19. "Clampdown"
20. "One More Time"
21. "Brand New Cadillac"
22. "The Street Parade"
23. "Janie Jones"
24. "Washington Bullets"
