= Prince Consort Gallery =

Exhibition venue in the Victoria and Albert Museum

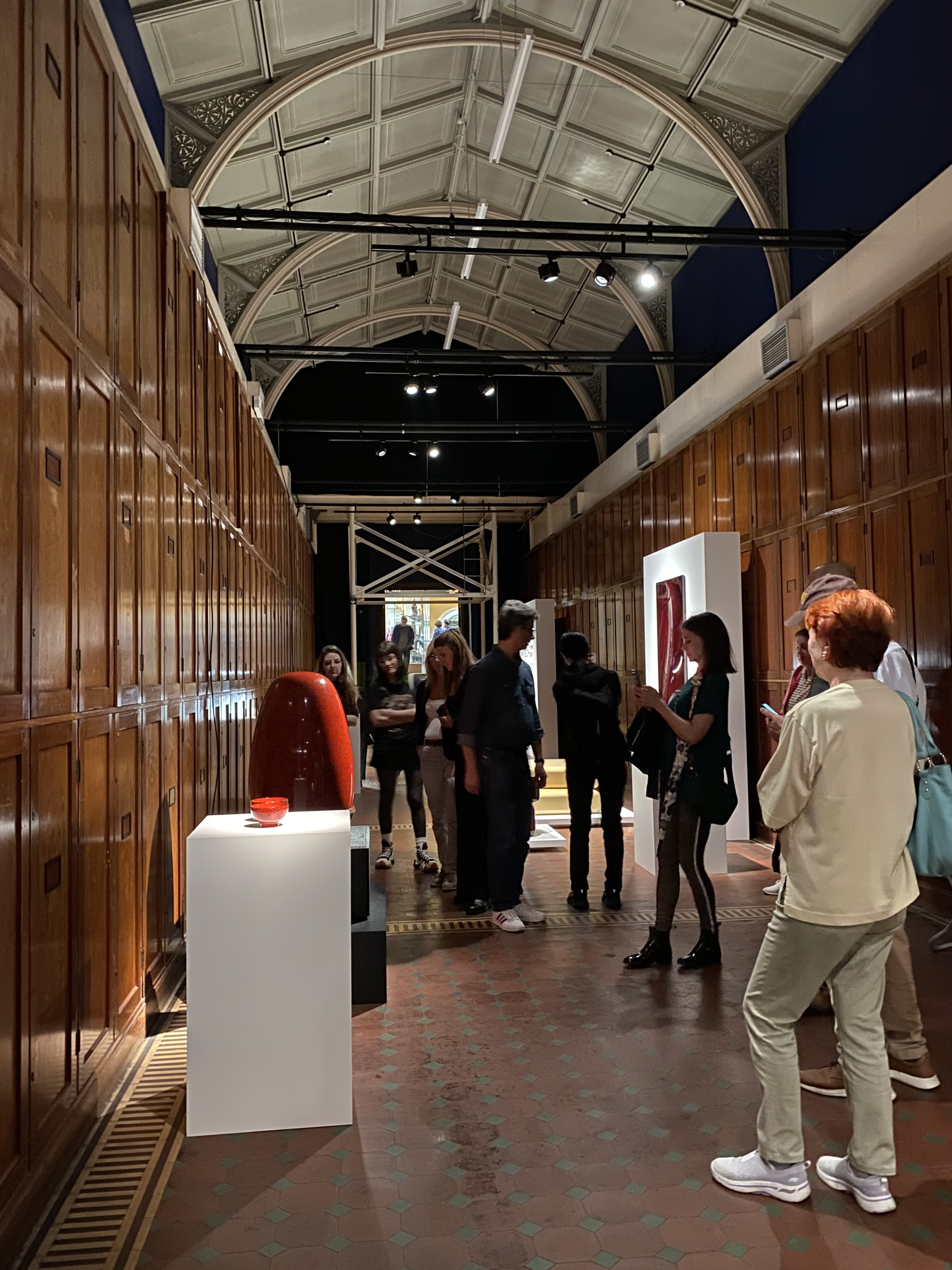
- View showing the gallery's 1950s mahogany cabinets and 1860s architectural features (pictured in 2024)
- Building: Victoria and Albert Museum
- Location: South Kensington, London
- Country: UK
- Coordinates: 51°29′50″N 00°10′17″W
- Area: c. 140 m²
- Named for: Prince Albert
- Architect: Francis Fowke

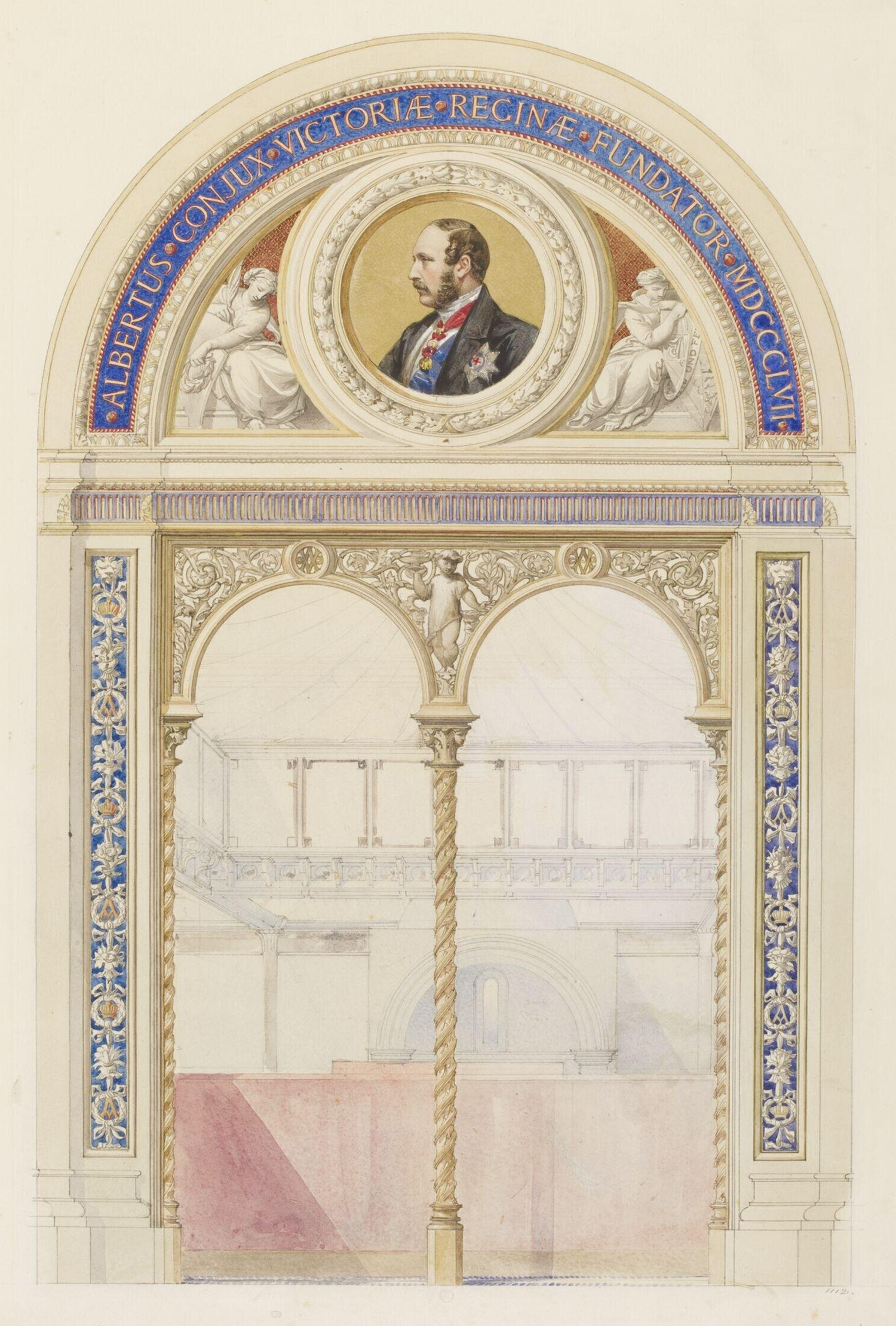
Architectural details of the gallery including a mosaic portrait of the Prince Albert designed by Godfrey Sykes (1880s)

The Prince Consort Gallery (V&A Gallery 110; Room 110) is an exhibition venue in the Victoria and Albert Museum (V&A) in London. It was constructed during the Victorian era as a showcase for what were then some of the South Kensington Museum's most valuable possessions. Subsequently, the space was reconfigured and used to store parts of the V&A's textile archive. The gallery is now used for special events and exhibitions, and occasionally, as a lunchroom for school groups and museum staff.

== History and function ==
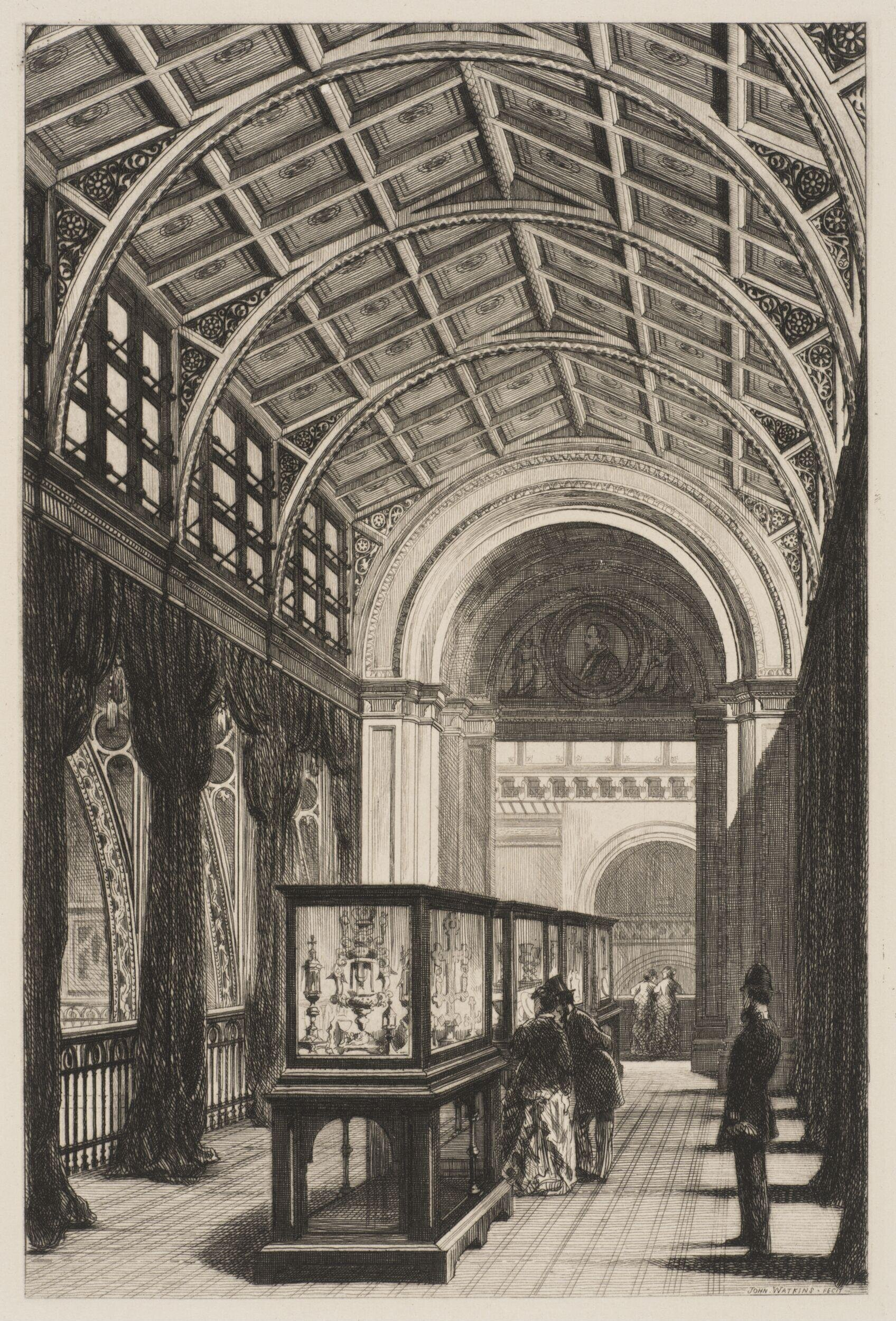
John Watkins etching of the "Prince Consort's Gallery" (1876–1881)

The V&A was a "pet project of Prince Albert" intended to improve the quality of British-manufactured goods. After its construction in the second half of the 19th century, the Prince Consort Gallery originally displayed "many of the most interesting and costly possessions of the Museum, in enamel, gold, and silversmith's work, jewellery, watches, clocks, &c." The objects displayed in the South Kensington Museum, as the V&A was then known, were "not just to delight connoisseurs, but to ... educate British designers, manufacturers and workers in good taste and technical prowess."

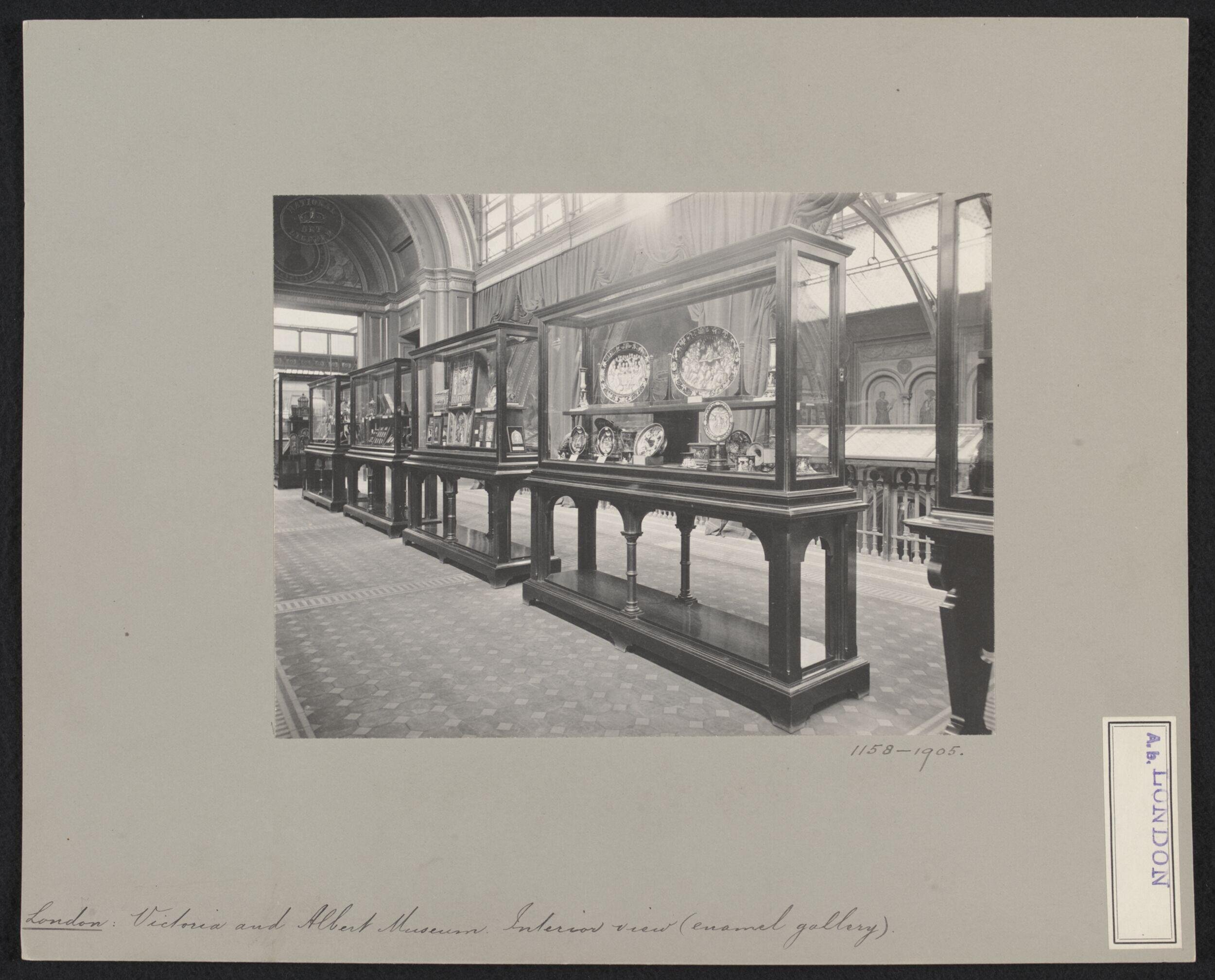
Historical photograph showing the gallery's original display cases; also visible are architectural features, detailing, and window openings that are now obscured (c. 1905)

Following the Second World War, during which many of the museum's holdings were dispersed to other locations for safekeeping, the gallery was never restored to its previous configuration. Initially, the space was closed to the public and served as a storeroom, then, in the 1950s, it was "lined with beautiful mahogany cabinets" which held fabrics and other woven pieces from the museum's textile collection. Eventually, when the textiles were transferred elsewhere, the space became a lunchroom for museum staff and large school groups.

Starting in 2012, the V&A began a redevelopment project to return the Prince Consort Gallery to its original purpose as a public gallery. (Note: "After the Second World War, Room 110 was boarded up to serve as storage space, but is currently (April 2012) part of a major redevelopment and restoration scheme intended to convert it back into a public gallery space.") More recently, it has been used as a venue for the London Design Festival (the V&A has also been described as the "true epicentre" of the festival itself), as well as events hosted by the museum such as artist in residence programmes, various special events, temporary exhibitions, and occasional private functions.

== Location and characteristics ==
Room 110 is a 35-meter long gallery, similar in proportion to the adjacent Gilbert Bayes Gallery (Room 111). It is situated between the two Leighton galleries (Rooms 102 and 107) on Level 2 of the museum. The ensemble of these galleries "were constructed chiefly of brick, somewhat profusely ornamented with terra-cotta, and were built from the designs of Captain Fowke". Architectural detailing and decorative elements by Godfrey Sykes, such as a mosaic portrait of Prince Albert (the Prince Consort from whom the gallery takes its name) can still be seen. (Note: "The mosaic portrait of Prince Albert which lent the gallery its nineteenth century name of 'The Prince Consort Gallery', may still be seen above the entrance to Room 102.")

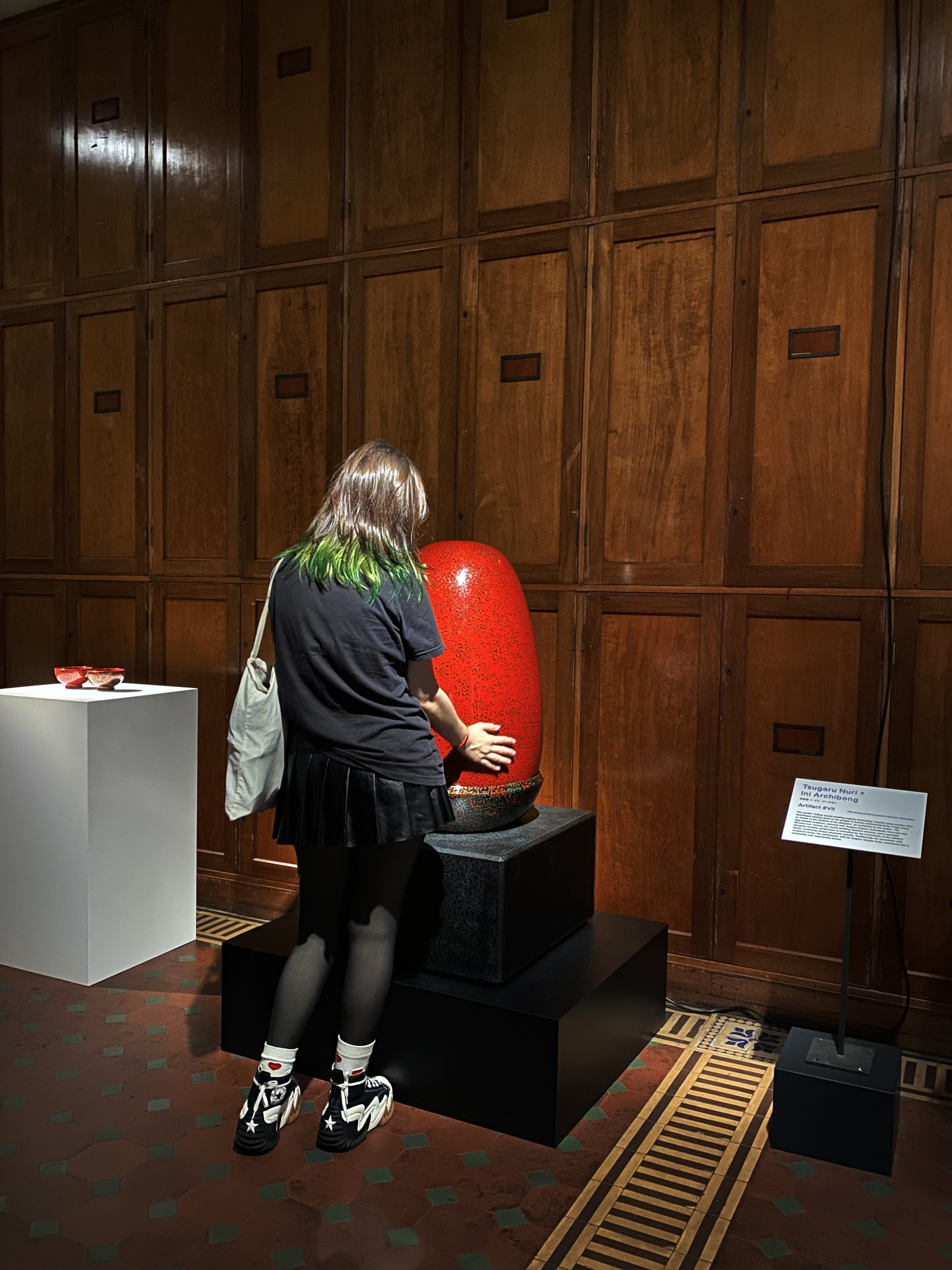
A museum visitor interacts with a Tsugaru Nuri lacquer theremin by Ini Archibong (showing 1950s mahogany cabinets and original tile floor details)

Both sides of the space are clad in 1950s wooden casework consisting of 102 tall mahogany storage cabinets that conceal most of the room's original architectural features, detailing, and window openings (some of which detail is still partially visible when certain cabinet doors are ajar). The space is covered by a Victorian era iron-framed roof structure, partially clad with coffered ceiling panels, and is entered through a partly concealed ornate barrel vaulted foyer. The original decorative motifs of the 19th-century tile floor are largely intact, though also partially concealed by the gallery's wooden cabinetry.

== Exhibitions and events ==
Since the gallery's conversion back into a public space, its use has been wide-ranging and diverse. The variety of events and exhibitions staged in the Prince Consort Gallery has encompassed everything from the display of complex experimental technologies and conceptual artworks, to avant-garde fashion and artisanal handcrafts; and from the work of well known creators, to the creations of emerging talents and underrepresented groups.

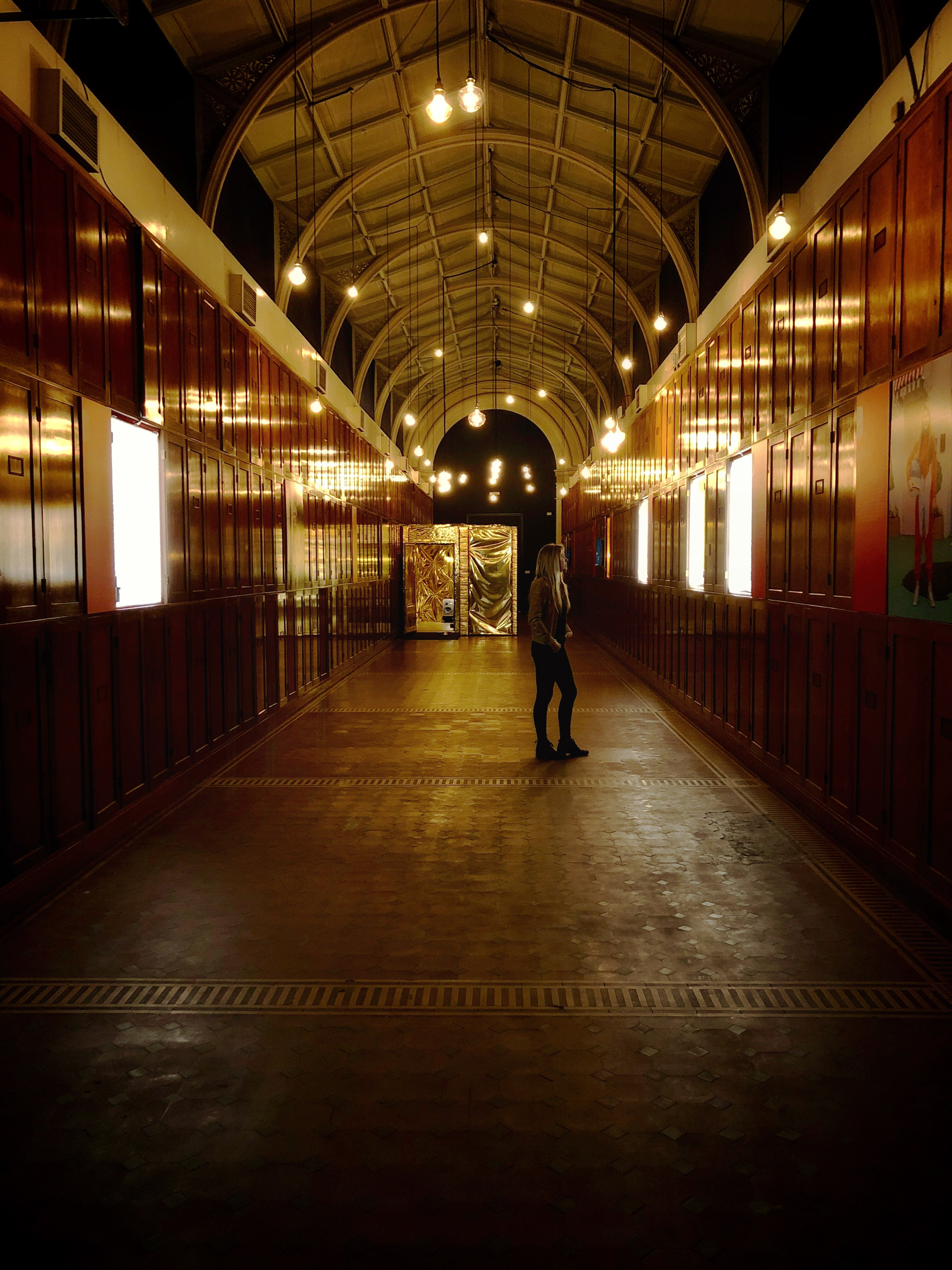
Beatie Wolfe's The Art of Music in the Digital Age

As part of the museum's ongoing residency programme, German artist and graphic designer Helmut Völter was invited in 2016 to spend six months working and studying in the museum's nearby photography archives (Rooms 100 and 101), at the conclusion of which time he presented a new work titled The Cabinets. Völter used the gallery's in-built features, including its mahogany cabinets, as part of an immersive installation that combined works from the museum's archives displayed in compositions together with his own writing, photographs, and research. The exhibition was sponsored in part by the Goethe-Institut.

In 2019, the V&A staged Behind the Curtain with British artist Francis Hamel, during which he was invited to install a temporary studio and paint in the gallery. Hamel worked on portraits of a number of well known personalities in situ, while museum visitors were invited to view his process and engage with the artist. Other interventions have included Beatie Wolfe's "series of world-first designs" titled The Art of Music in the Digital Age, and an immersive transformation of the space into an installation by the Canadian artist and lighting designer Flynn Talbot which he called a Reflection Room (2018 and 2017 respectively).

During the 2019 London Design Festival (LDF), the Sony Design Studio installed an interactive autonomous robotic AI pendulum called Affinity in Autonomy which explored the evolving relationship between technology and humans. In 2023 the gallery displayed multi-disciplinary hand-crafted works titled Unstruck Melody by Nirbhai (Nep) Singh Sidhu, made in collaboration with the arts collective Without Shape Without Form. In 2024 the V&A hosted the Craft x Tech Tohoku Project, an exploration of how traditional "aesthetic sensibilities embedded in Japanese craft" can be reinterpreted through the lens of contemporary technology. The exhibition featured works made by traditional artisans from the Tohoku region of Japan in collaboration with artists and designers including Ini Archibong, Sabine Marcelis, Yoichi Ochiai and Studio Swine amongst others.

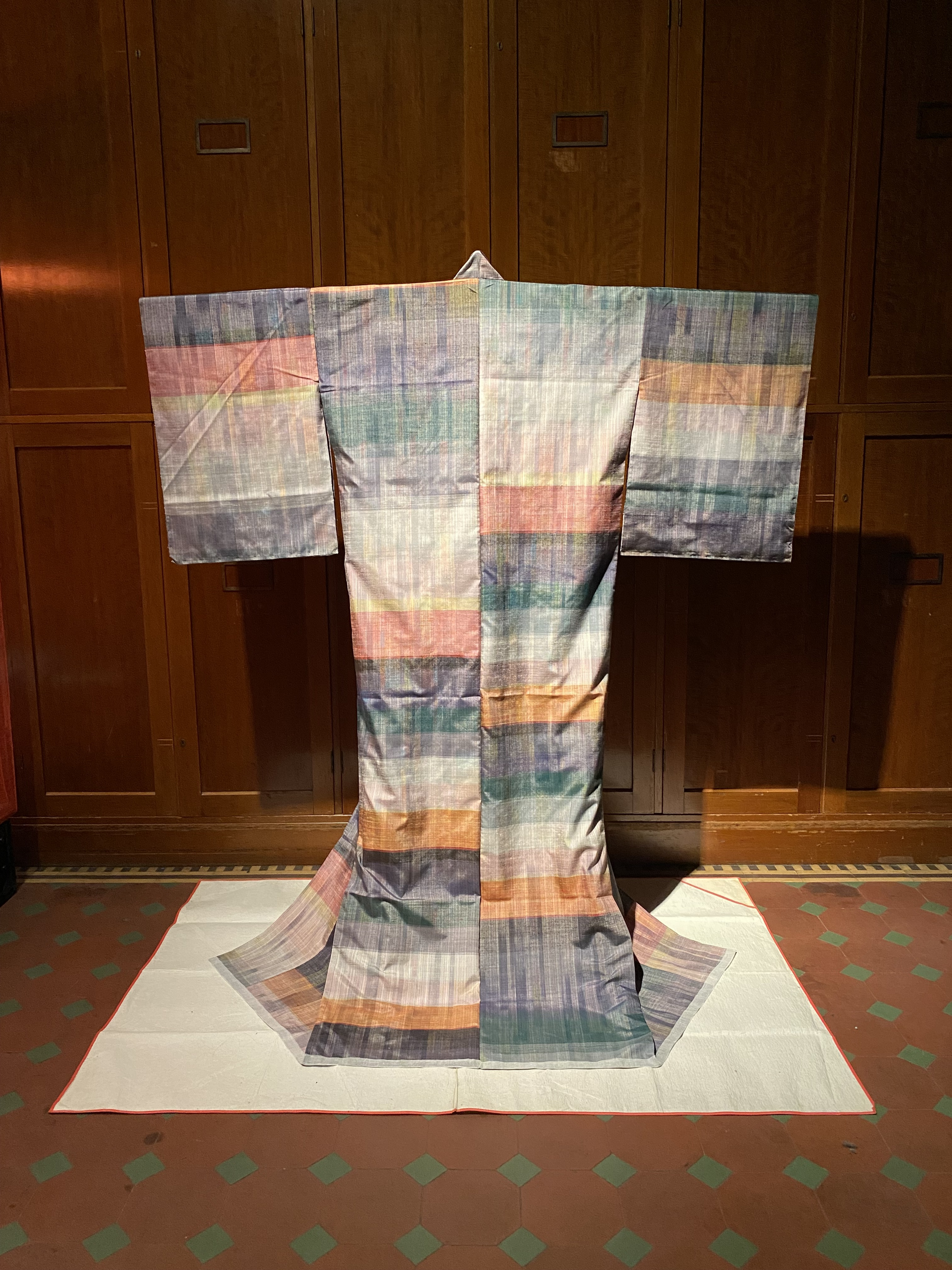
Oitama Tsumugi kimono by Gentaro Nitta pictured in the Craft x Tech Tohoku Project exhibition (2024)

The 2025 edition of the LDF used the space to exhibit a series of "futuristic garments, combining symmetrical forms with complex curves" by Ryunosuke Okazaki. The show was the European debut of JOMONJOMON – conceptual pieces that reference the sculptural aesthetics of Japanese pottery from the Jōmon period (a dress from this series was also added to the museum's permanent collection).

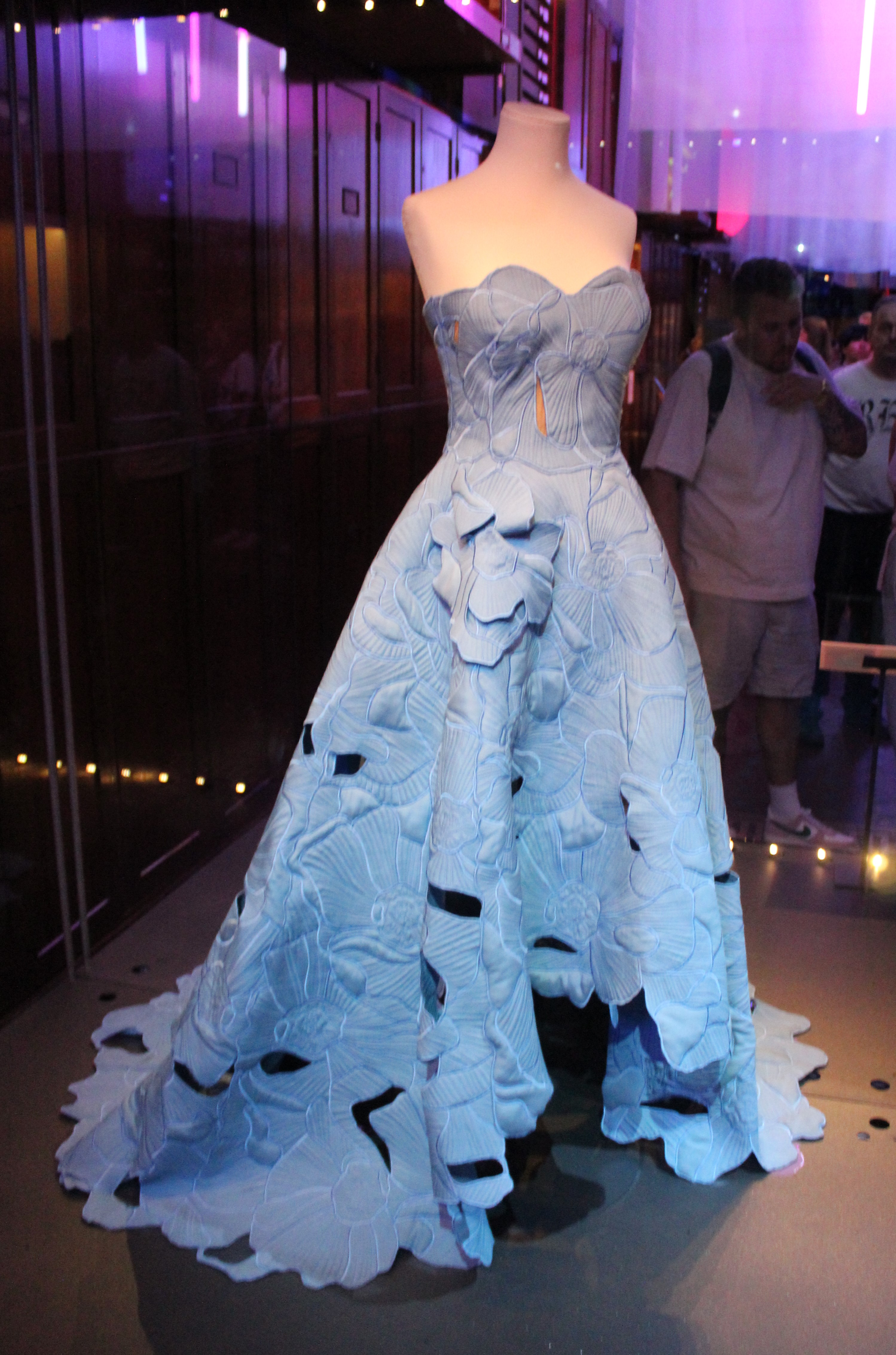
Eras Tour ballgown by Oscar de la Renta pictured in the Taylor Swift Songbook Trail exhibition (2024)

The Prince Consort Gallery was the 10th of 13 "stops" that were laid out across the V&A for the 2024 Taylor Swift Songbook Trail exhibition, and the only space in the museum dedicated exclusively to the show. In addition to a ballgown by Oscar de la Renta that Swift wore during her Eras Tour, the "Midnights" stop in the "rarely seen" gallery also included costumes worn for the video of the song Bejeweled (which featured Laura Dern, Jack Antonoff, and Dita Von Teese).

== See also ==
- Cast Courts – Galleries in the Victoria and Albert Museum
- Daylit Gallery – Exhibition space in the Victoria and Albert Museum
- List of design museums
- Prince Consort's Library – Building by Francis Fowke in Aldershot, England
