= Godfrey Sykes =

English painter

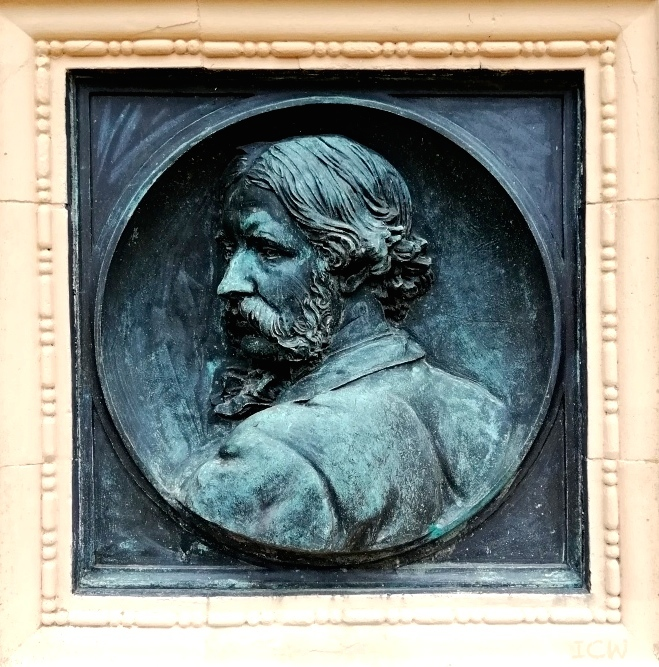
- Godfrey Sykes, detail upon his Memorial Column in Weston Park, Sheffield
- Born: 1824
- Died: 1866 (aged 41–42)

Godfrey Sykes (born Malton, North Riding of Yorkshire, 1824 – died London 28 February 1866) was an English designer, metalworker, sculptor and painter.

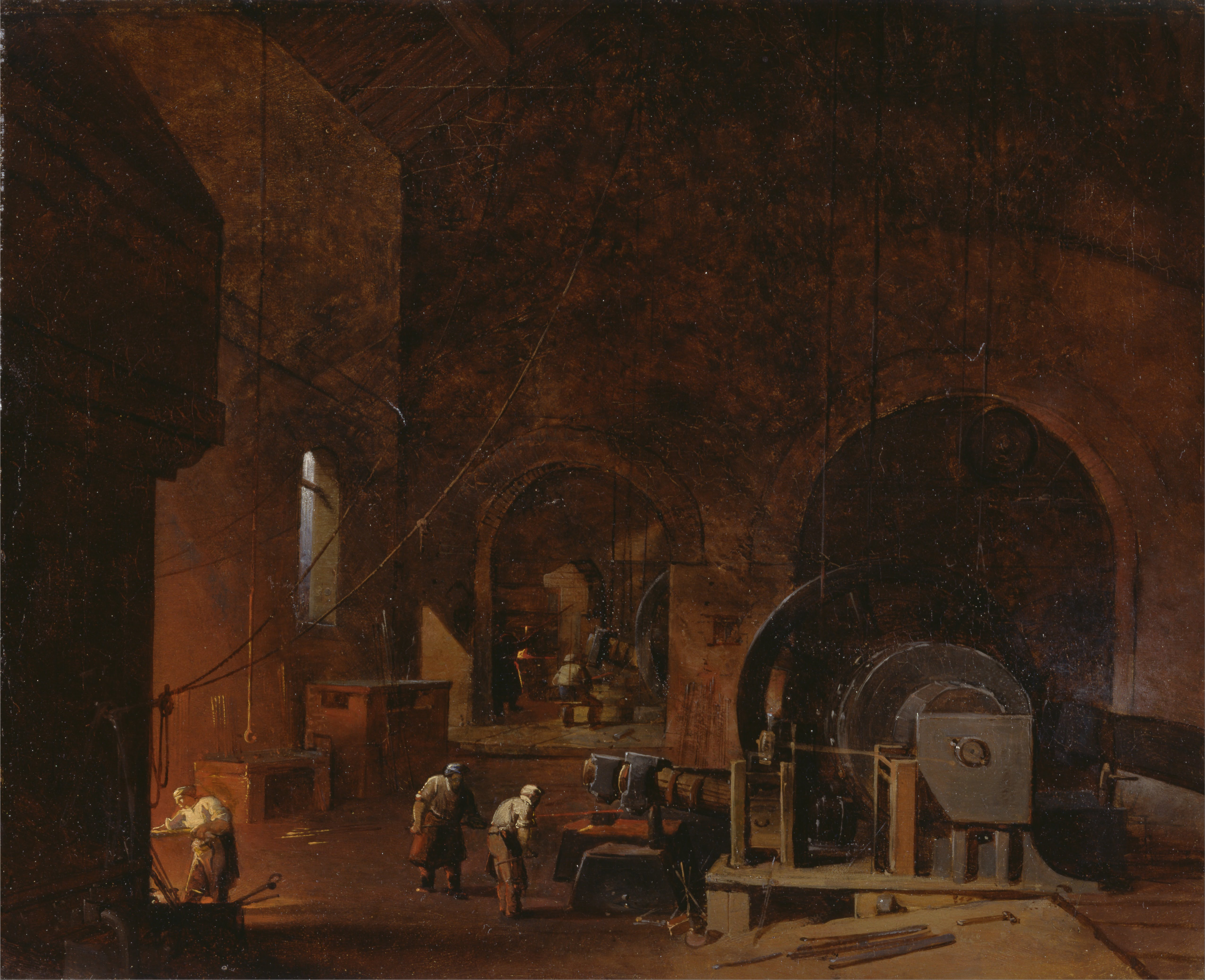
Interior of an ironworks (1850)

== Biography ==
=== Early career ===
After an apprenticeship to the Sheffield engraver James Bell, he trained at the Sheffield School of Art from 1843 and taught there from 1857 becoming the assistant headmaster. While at Sheffield he at first painted pictures of rolling-mills, smiths' shops, and similar subjects. In the early 1850s, he met Alfred Stevens, who had moved to Sheffield in 1850 to become chief designer at the ironfounders Henry E Hoole & Co. Sykes was greatly influenced by Stevens's work in the Renaissance Revival manner, and for a period worked at Hoole's under Stevens. He executed such decorative works as a frieze for the Mechanics Institute in 1853 and a ceiling for the news room for The Telegraphic in 1856.

=== Move to London ===
In 1861 he was invited to London to assist Francis Fowke on the buildings connected with the horticultural gardens then in course of formation. Some of the arcades were entrusted to him, and to his successful treatment of them with terracotta the subsequent popularity of that material was largely due. The new buildings for the South Kensington Museum gave further scope for the exercise of Sykes's powers, and upon the decoration of these he was engaged until his death. His most admired work at the museum, according to the Dictionary of National Biography is the series of terra-cotta columns which he modelled for the lecture theatre. His designs for the majolica decorations of the refreshment-rooms he did not live to complete. Some of his general schemes for the decoration of the museum were exhibited at the Royal Academy in 1862 and 1864. Sykes's style, while based upon the study of Raphael and Michelangelo, was thoroughly individual, and characterised by a fine taste and sense of proportion.

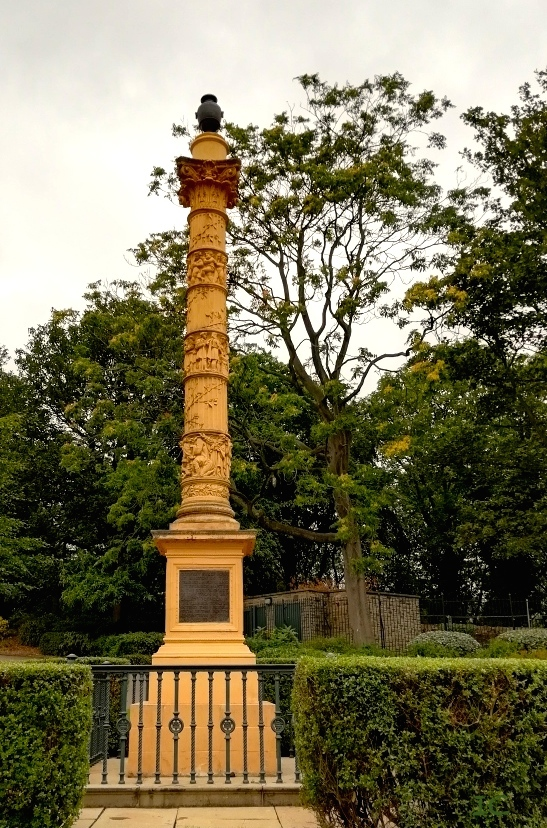
Godfrey Sykes Memorial Column, Weston Park, Sheffield, built in 1871

Whilst Sykes was working on his designs at the V&A he was befriended by a circle of artistic celebrities including artists Frederick Leighton and Seymour Haden, and author Charles Dickens. Even Queen Victoria and Prince Albert were regular visitors to see the progress of his designs for the V&A. From an account in the Cornhill magazine, it talks about his personality and his hobbies. It mentions him bringing a comic element to a dinner of artists and a boy-like attitude to life at home, including playing cricket in the hall. One of Sykes great passions in life apart from his art was flying kites and skating. Sykes died at Old Brompton, London, on 28 February 1866, and was buried in the Brompton Cemetery. A watercolour drawing of a smith's shop by Sykes is in the Victoria and Albert Museum. At the request of Thackeray he designed the well-known cover of the Cornhill Magazine.

== Exhibitions ==
- His works have been exhibited at the Graves Art Gallery in Sheffield.
- One of his mosaics is also incorporated into the north facade of the Victoria and Albert Museum in London.

== Works ==
- Pirelli Courtyard
- Frieze, Pirelli Courtyard
- Carved Pilaster, Pirelli Courtyard
- Henry Cole Wing (1) V&A
- Henry Cole Wing (2) V&A
- Roof and corner, Henry Cole Wing V&A
- Terracota rondel on the Henry Cole wing V&A
- Ornamented pillar and tiling on the Henry Cole wing V&A
- Funerary Monument to William Mulready, RA
- Decorative elements including mosaic portrait, Prince Consort Gallery, V&A

== Godfrey Sykes Memorial & Column ==
Hugh Gamble's 'Monument to Godfrey Sykes', was completed in 1871 and paid for by donations from the public. The monument was erected in Weston Park, Sheffield, in 1875, and is made from terracotta, bronze and stone.
