= Prince Consort's Library =

Building by Francis Fowke in Aldershot, England

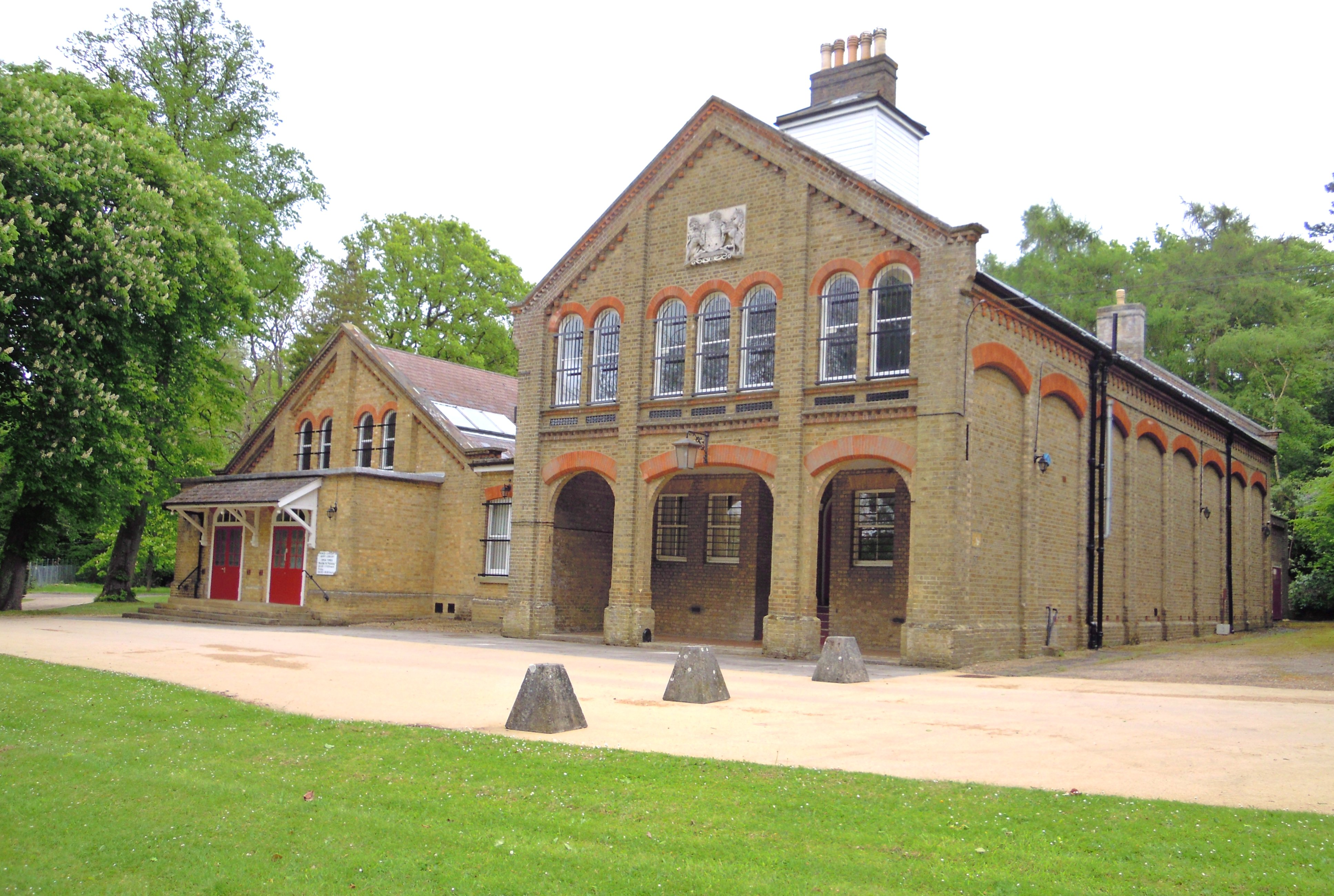
- The Prince Consort's Library in 2014
- 51.2546°N 0.7724°W
- Location: Knollys Road, Aldershot Garrison, Hampshire, United Kingdom
- Type: Special library
- Scope: Military
- Established: 1860 (166 years ago)
- Architect: Francis Fowke

Access and use
- Access requirements: Open to military personnel

Building details

General information
- Construction started: September 1859
- Opened: September 1860

Design and construction
- Architect: Francis Fowke

The Prince Consort's Library in Aldershot Military Town in the English county of Hampshire was founded by Prince Albert to contribute to the education of soldiers in the British Army. Today it is the military specialist library of the Army Library Service, specialising in the provision of information on current military topics, political subjects and international relations in support of operations, intelligence, training and education in the Armed Forces. It is a Grade II listed building.

== History ==
The Library in 1890 before the building of the Lecture Hall and Reading Room

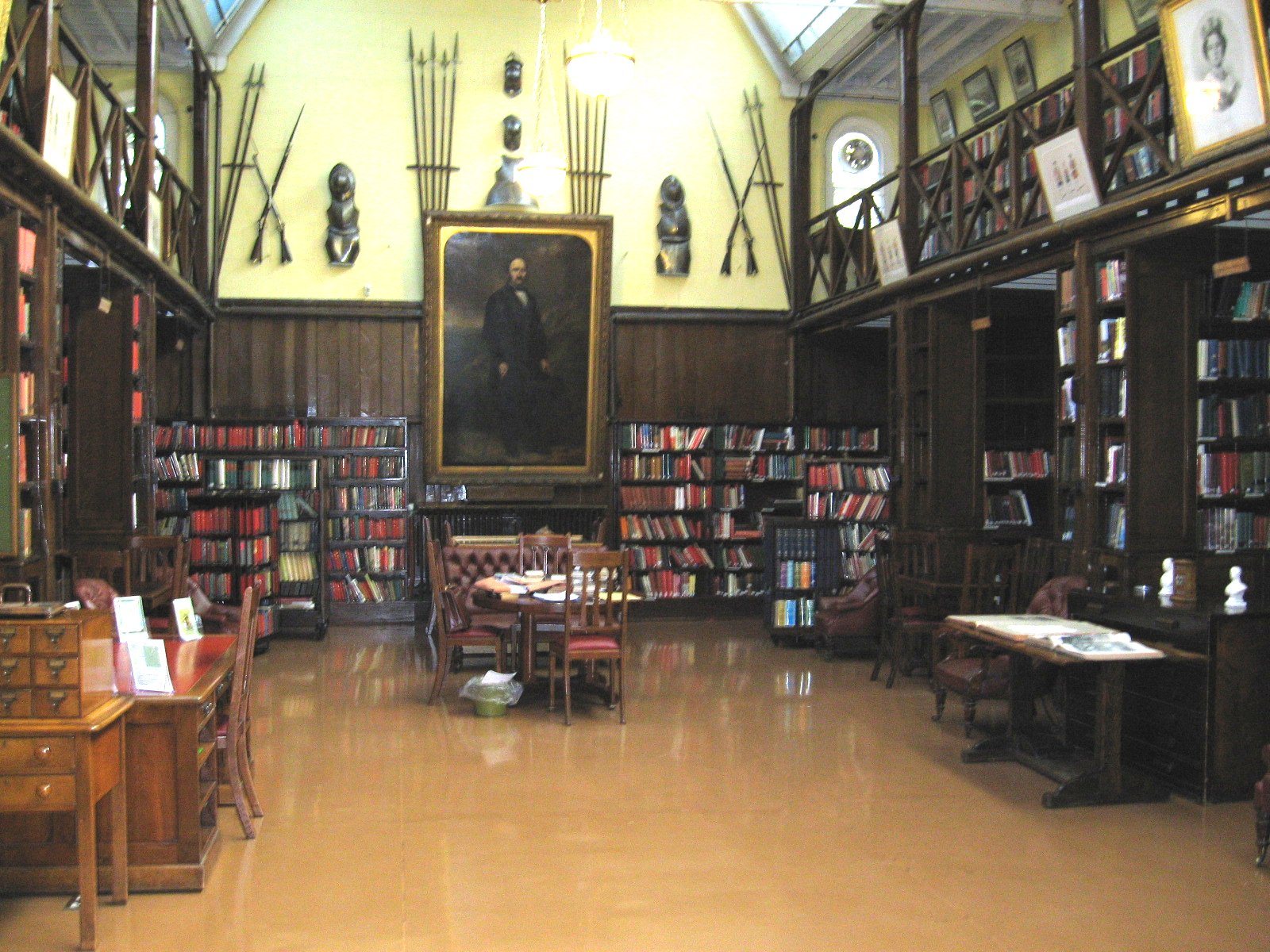
Interior of the Library in 2007

On 1 June 1859 Colonel Phipps wrote on behalf of Prince Albert to Major-General J. Peel, the Secretary of State for War, stating that the Prince Consort was 'desirous of presenting a collection of 1,000 books to the officers at the Camp at Aldershot', adding that the Prince would also provide the library to house the books.

After further correspondence, work began on building the Library in September 1859, and it opened in September 1860 with 1,000 books which were donated from the collection of Prince Albert. The Prince also paid the cost of building the Library, its furnishings, maintenance, and for the planting of trees and shrubs. The total cost amounted to £4,183.3s and 4d.

The day-to-day running costs of the Library were paid for by the Prince Consort until his death in 1861, when Queen Victoria made it known that she wished to continue the Royal interest in the Library and ordered that its maintenance was to be met from the Privy Purse. She also paid the salary of the first official Librarian, Sergeant Charles Gilmore (1834–1914) of the 49th Regiment of Foot, who held the post from 1861 to 1891, and his pension on his retirement.

By 1887 the Library still only held 2,160 books, so the Aldershot Military Society was founded on 23 December 1887, under the patronage of Queen Victoria, to pay for further books through the subscription paid by members of the Society, while the Privy Purse continued to pay for the Library's maintenance. This arrangement continued until 1935, when the War Office assumed responsibility for both providing books and maintaining the building.

The Prince Consort's Library was designed by Captain Francis Fowke of the Royal Engineers, who also designed the Royal Albert Hall and parts of the Victoria and Albert Museum. An additional wing containing a lecture hall and reading room was added in 1911.

== See also ==
- Prince Consort Gallery – Exhibition venue in the Victoria and Albert Museum
