= St James the Great, Morpeth =

St James Church
- St James the Great
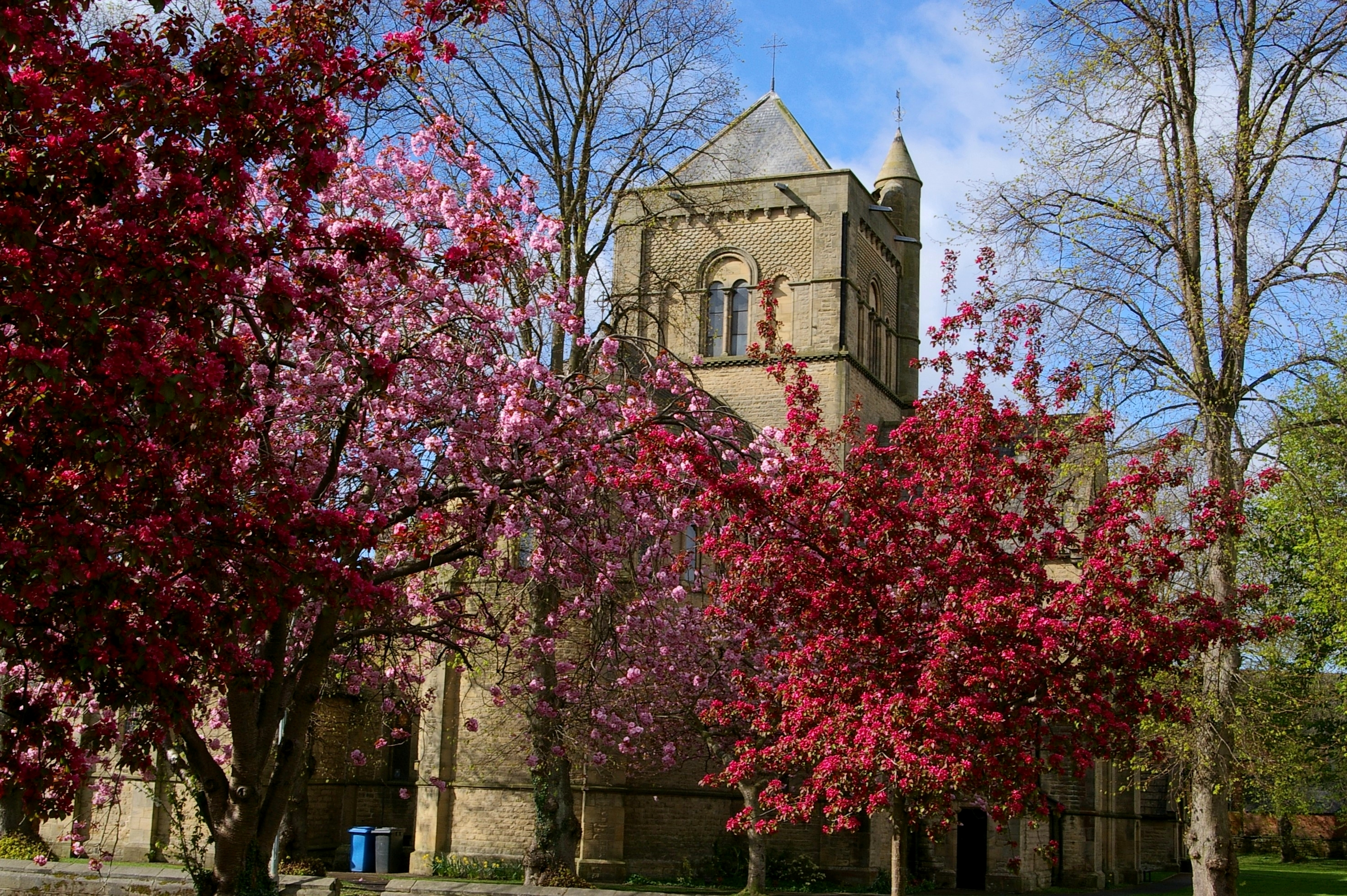
- St James Church
- 55°10′12″N 1°41′26″W
- OS grid reference: NZ 19804 86238
- Location: Morpeth, Northumberland
- Country: England
- Denomination: Church of England
- Website: www.parishofmorpeth.org.uk/stjames/

History
- Consecrated: 15 October 1846

Architecture
- Functional status: Active
- Architect: Benjamin Ferrey
- Style: Romanesque
- Years built: 1842-6
- Groundbreaking: St James Day 1844

Administration
- Diocese: Diocese of Newcastle
- Archdeaconry: Lindisfarne
- Parish: Morpeth

St James the Great, or St James' Church, is a Grade II* listed church in Morpeth, Northumberland. The entrance screen which allows access to the churchyard from Newgate Street is also separately Grade II* listed.

It is believed that the murals in the church used the Gambier Parry process. They were painted in about 1875 by Clayton and Bell but their records were lost. Some of the work was painted over in the 1970s.

The church is still used for services and is currently part of the Anglican parish of Morpeth.
