= Francis Hamel =

British painter (born 1963)

- Hamel in 2019
- Born: 1963 (age 62–63); London
- Education: Summer Fields School, Marlborough College, Ruskin School of Art
- Occupations: Painter, portraitist
- Website: francishamel.com

Francis Hamel (born 1963) is a British painter based in Oxford, known for creating landscapes and portraits.

== Early life and education ==
Hamel was born in 1963. Hamel attended Summer Fields School in north Oxford and Marlborough College, and studied at the Ruskin School of Art (1982–1985) while a student of Magdalen College, Oxford.

== Career ==
In a 1995 Sunday Times article Hamel was quoted as saying that only two others of his 30 contemporaries at the Ruskin School of Art were earning a living as professional painters, and that "the most important thing is just painting pictures all the time. It takes a terribly long time to get even half decent at it. There is also a measure of luck thrown in. At the moment people seem to want to buy the kind of pictures I'm painting." He had sold more than a quarter of the works in his first one-man exhibition by the end of the private view.

Hamel's portrait of Brian Fall (2002) is in the collection of Lady Margaret Hall, Oxford.

In 2008 he was commissioned to paint a large group of works for the refurbished Fortnum & Mason store in London.

In 2015 and 2016 he was commissioned to paint a series of portraits of the past holders of the University of Oxford's Cameron Mackintosh Professorship of Contemporary Theatre. In 2019 he was invited by the Victoria and Albert museum to set up a studio in the museum's Prince Consort Gallery, where 27 of these portraits of well known people from the theatre world were displayed. The event, titled Behind the Curtain: Francis Hamel in Residence saw the artist working live while in dialogue with the public. The works on display included portraits of such well known figures as Stephen Sondheim and Deborah Warner, and causing some controversy, Kevin Spacey, who had held the Mackintosh Professorship in 2008. A book containing a broad selection of Hamel's paintings and drawings was published to coincide with the Victoria and Albert museum exhibition (John Martin Gallery, 2019: ISBN 978-1-9993013-1-6).

Hamel's 2020 exhibition Painting the Yellow Mountain at the John Martin Gallery showed painting resulting from trips to China and Hong Kong in 2019.

Hamel lives in a cottage in the grounds of Rousham House and during lockdown in 2020–2021 made a series of 80 paintings of the gardens while they were closed to the public. These were exhibited at Rousham and at the John Martin Gallery in London in October and November 2021, and published with essays by various writers as The Gardens at Rousham (Clearview, 2021: ISBN 978-1908337610).

In October 2021 Hamel appeared on BBC Radio 4's The Museum of Curiosity, when his hypothetical donation to this imaginary museum was the painting The Garden of Earthly Delights by Hieronymus Bosch.

In 2025, Hamel exhibited 'The Oxford Paintings', and published a book containing a selection of his paintings of Oxford to accompany the exhibition (John Martin Gallery, 2025: ISBN 978-1908337-757).
