= Gambier Parry process =

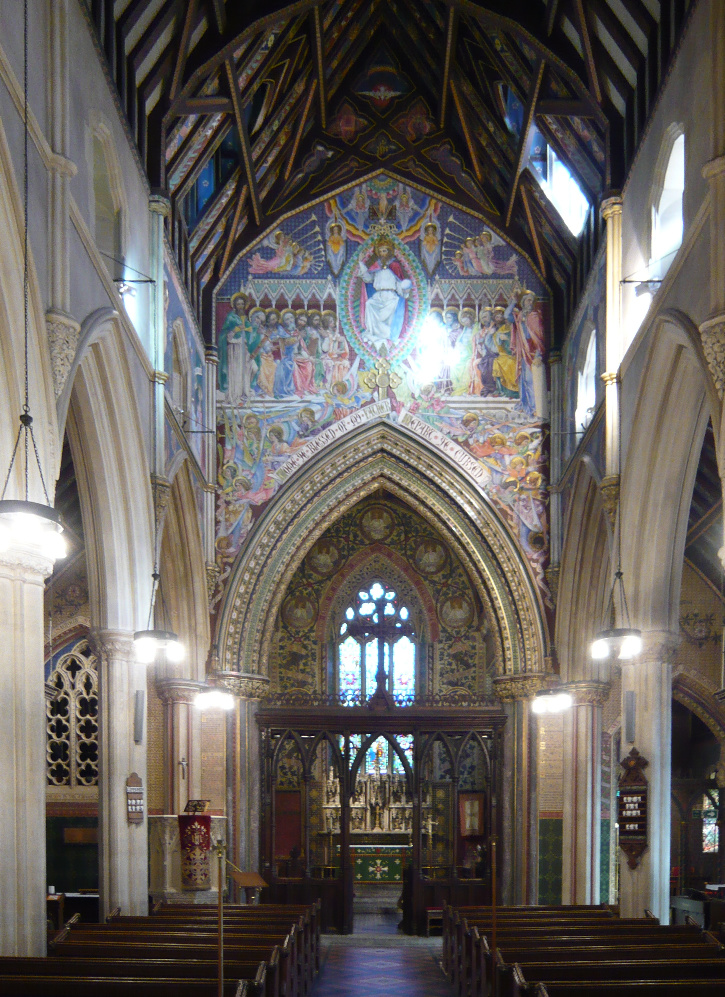
Gambier Parry's own frescoes in Highnam church

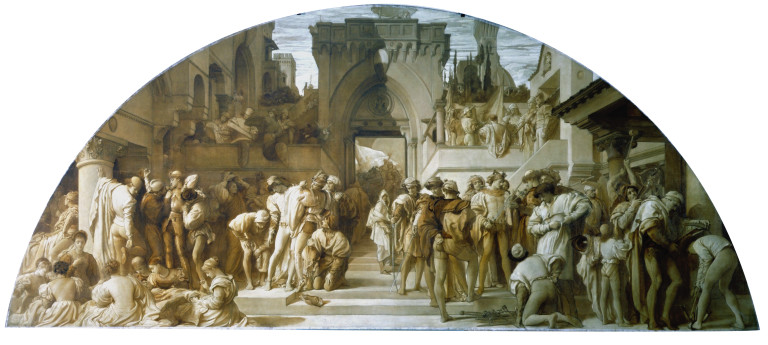
Cartoon for the fresco The Arts of Industry as Applied to War, 1870–72, by Frederic Leighton at the V&A Museum

The Gambier Parry process is a development of the classical technique of fresco for painting murals, named for Thomas Gambier Parry.

True fresco is the technique of painting on fresh lime plaster whereby the pigments are fixed by the carbonatation of the lime (calcium hydroxide). The technique requires no other binding medium and the fixing process produces a durable crystalline paint layer. However, only a limited range of pigments are suitable for true frescoes and the technique requires careful application under controlled conditions, and relatively low humidity thereafter. In some environments, conventional fresco colours can rapidly accumulate dirt and grime. The decoration of the new Houses of Parliament in the mid-nineteenth century saw an embarrassing failure of true fresco in England but had generated a revival in mural painting.

Gambier Parry developed a spirit medium for use on a specially prepared plaster or canvas ground and in 1862 he published his recipe. Originally it used beeswax, oil of spike lavender, spirits of turpentine, elemi resin and copal varnish, and was complex both in preparing the wall surface and applying the paint. With commercialisation the process was simplified and became widely known.

The system was used by Frederic Leighton for The Arts of Industry as Applied to War and The Arts of Industry as Applied to Peace at the Victoria & Albert Museum (1870-72) and by Ford Madox Brown on the Manchester Murals in Manchester Town Hall (1879-93). One of the most complete examples of the Gambier Parry process may be seen at St Leonard's Church, Newland, Worcestershire where frescoes cover the interior of the church; St Leonard's is the private chapel of the Beauchamp Almshouses.

It is believed that the murals in St James church in Morpeth used this process. They were painted in about 1875 by Clayton and Bell but their records were lost. Some of their work was painted over in the 1970s.
