= Leighton Frescoes =

Two frescoes by Frederic Leighton

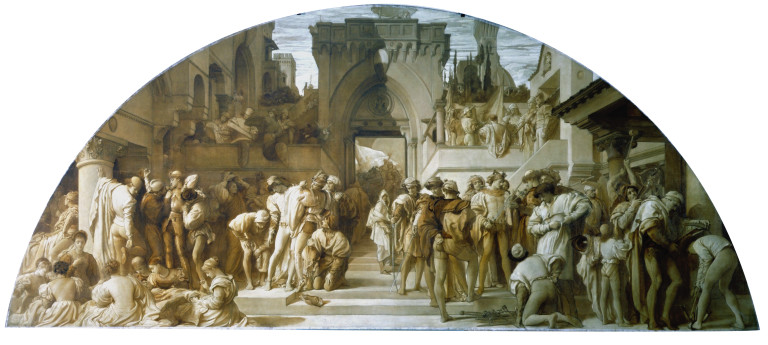
Cartoon for the fresco The Arts of Industry as Applied to War, 1870–1872, Frederic Leighton V&A Museum no. 296-1907

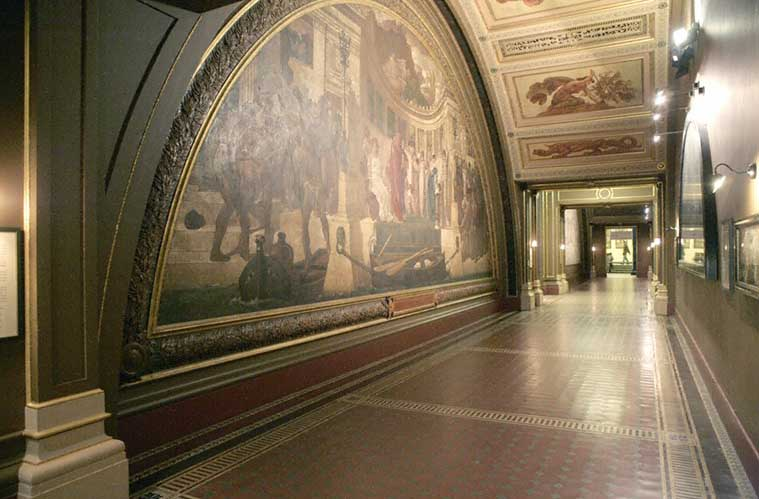
The Arts of Industry as Applied to Peace, 1870–1872, Frederic Leighton (1830–1896) Room 107

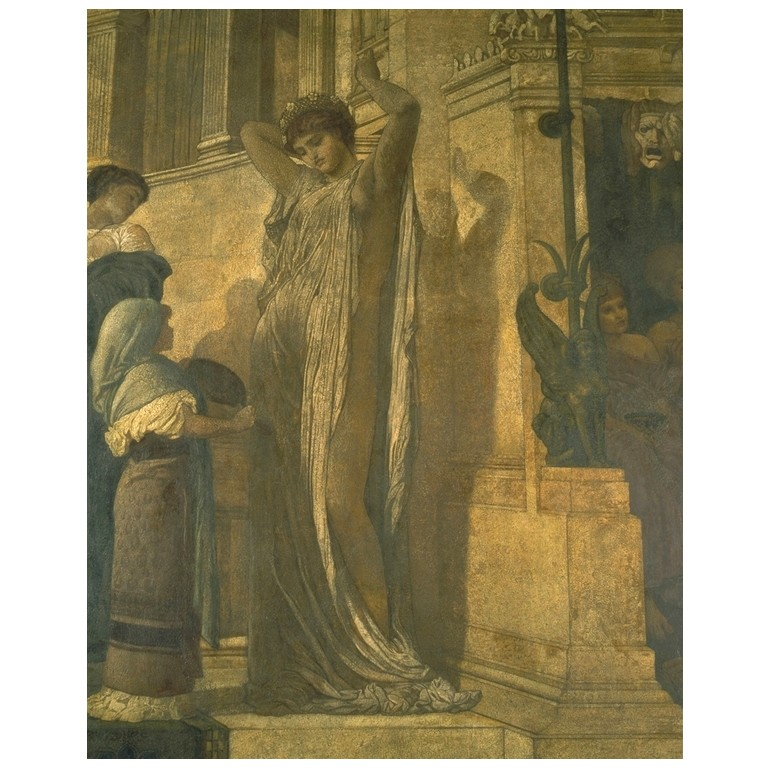
Detail from The Arts of Industry as Applied to Peace, 1870–1872, Frederic Leighton (1830–1896) Room 109

The Leighton Frescoes were commissioned in 1868 as the central feature of the elaborate decorations of the Victoria and Albert Museum's South Court. The artist of the two enormous works which each measure 10.7 metres across, was Frederic Leighton (1830–1896), one of the most important figures in the late Victorian art world. Leighton's work is remarkable for its command of large-scale design, brilliant technique, intellectual sophistication and skilful, often erotic depiction of the human body.

The two frescoes, The Arts of Industry as Applied to War and The Arts of Industry as Applied to Peace, celebrate human artistic achievements.

War portrays the princess and courtiers of an Italian Renaissance city state setting out for battle. Peace is set in a classical world of order and plenty. It is designed to evoke a sense of beauty rather than illustrate a specific narrative, and depicts a central group of wealthy elegant women dressing while, either side, workmen unload luxurious carpets and ceramics from barges.

Both are spirit frescoes; War was painted using the Gambier Parry process, which was adapted further by Leighton for Peace.

== Bibliography ==
- Jackson, Anna, ed. (2001). V&A: A Hundred Highlights. V&A Publications. ISBN 1-85177-365-7
