= Francis Fowke =

British engineer and architect (1823–1865)

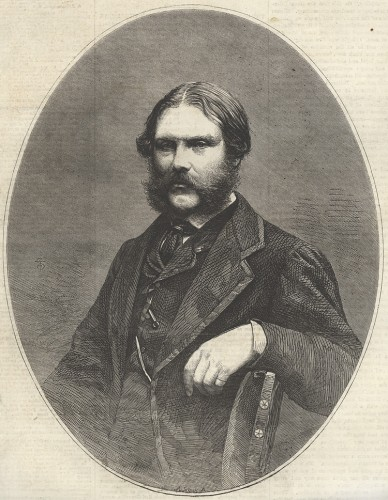
- Born: 7 July 1823; Ballysillan, Belfast, Ireland
- Died: 4 December 1865 (aged 42); London, England
- Occupation: Architect
- Buildings: Victoria & Albert Museum; Chiswick House; Royal Albert Hall; Royal Museum Edinburgh

Francis Fowke (7 July 1823 – 4 December 1865) was an Irish engineer and architect, and a captain in the Corps of Royal Engineers. Most of his architectural work was executed in the Renaissance style, although he made use of relatively new technologies to create iron-framed buildings, with large open galleries and spaces.

Fowke was born in Ballysillan, Belfast. He studied at The Royal School Dungannon, County Tyrone, and the Royal Military Academy, Woolwich. He obtained a commission in the Royal Engineers, and served with distinction in Bermuda and Paris. On his return to England, he was appointed architect and engineer in charge of the construction of several government buildings.

Among his projects were the Prince Consort's Library in Aldershot, the Royal Albert Hall and parts of the Victoria and Albert Museum in London, the Industrial Museum of Scotland (Edinburgh Museum of Science and Art) in Edinburgh, and the National Gallery of Ireland in Dublin. He was also responsible for planning the 1862 International Exhibition in London. The International Exhibition building was described as 'a wretched shed' by The Art Journal.

Parliament declined the Government's proposal to purchase the building; the materials were sold and used for the construction of Alexandra Palace.

Before his sudden death from a burst blood vessel, he won the competition for the design of the Natural History Museum, although he did not live to see it executed. His renaissance designs for the museum were altered and realised in the 1870s by Alfred Waterhouse, on the site of Fowke's Exhibition building.

He died in 1865 and is buried in Brompton Cemetery, London.

A medal was issued by the Royal Engineers in 1865, as a memorial prize for architectural works carried out by members of the corps. With the demise of great architectural works the prize has transformed into the prize awarded to the top student on the Royal Engineers Clerks of Works course.

== Gallery of architectural work ==
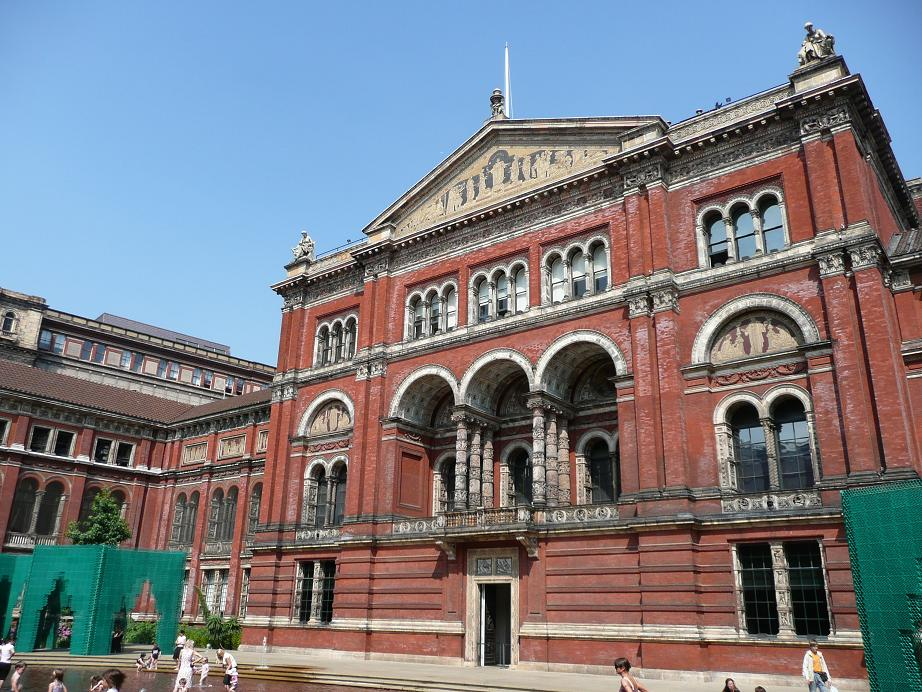
Victoria & Albert Museum, north side of garden, original main entrance

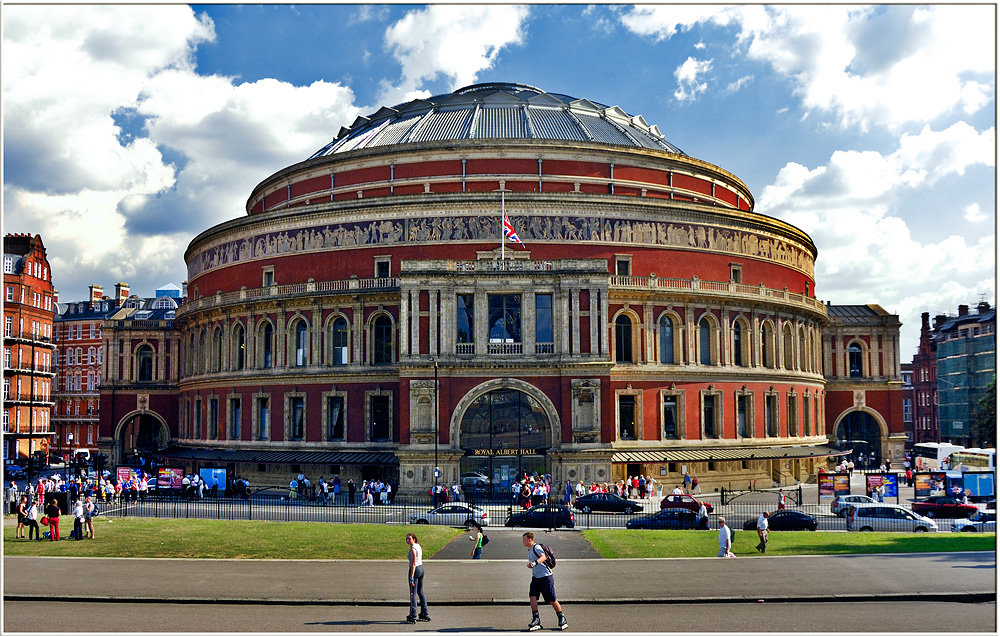
Royal Albert Hall

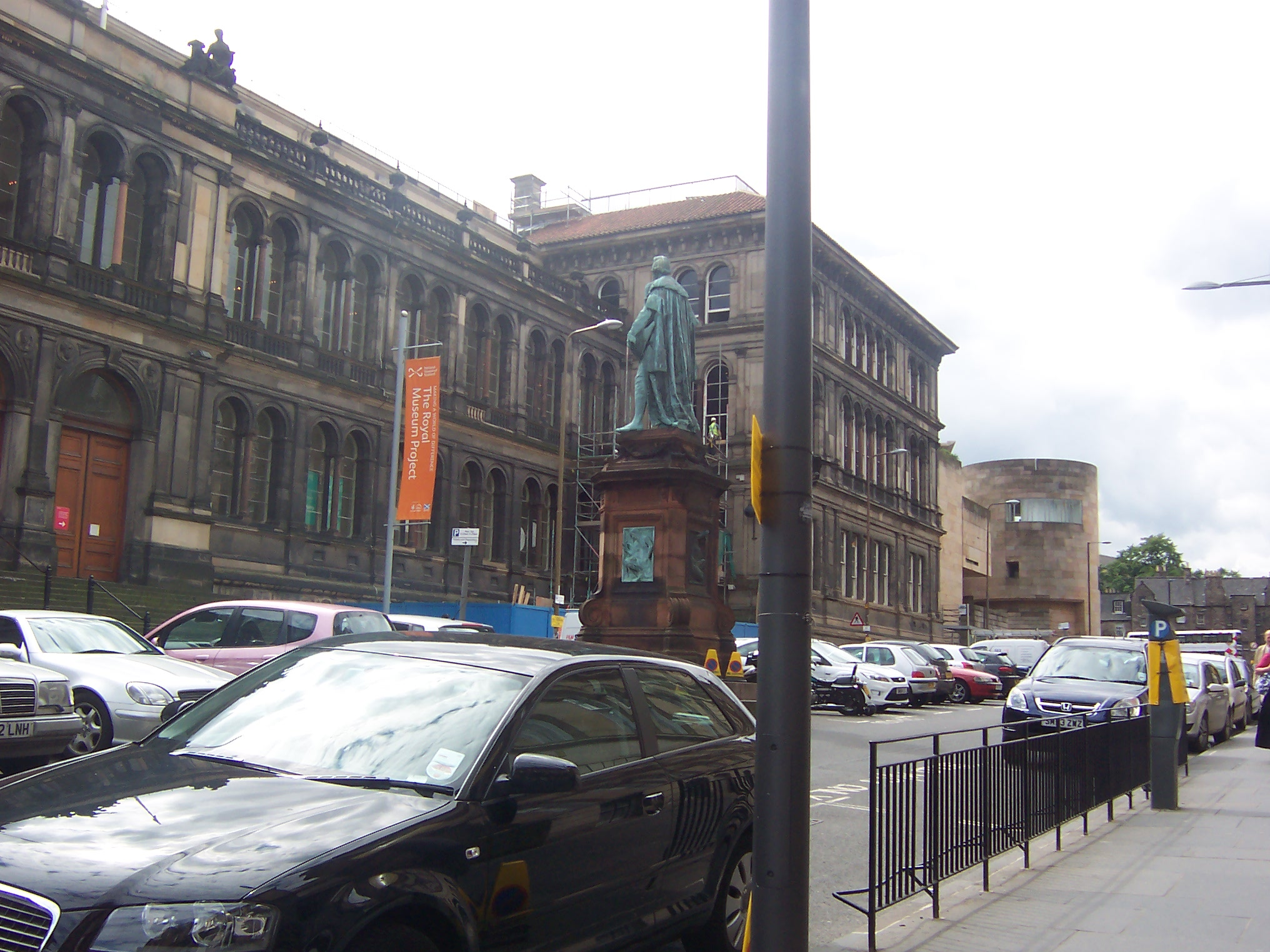
Edinburgh Museum of Science and Art (Royal Museum)

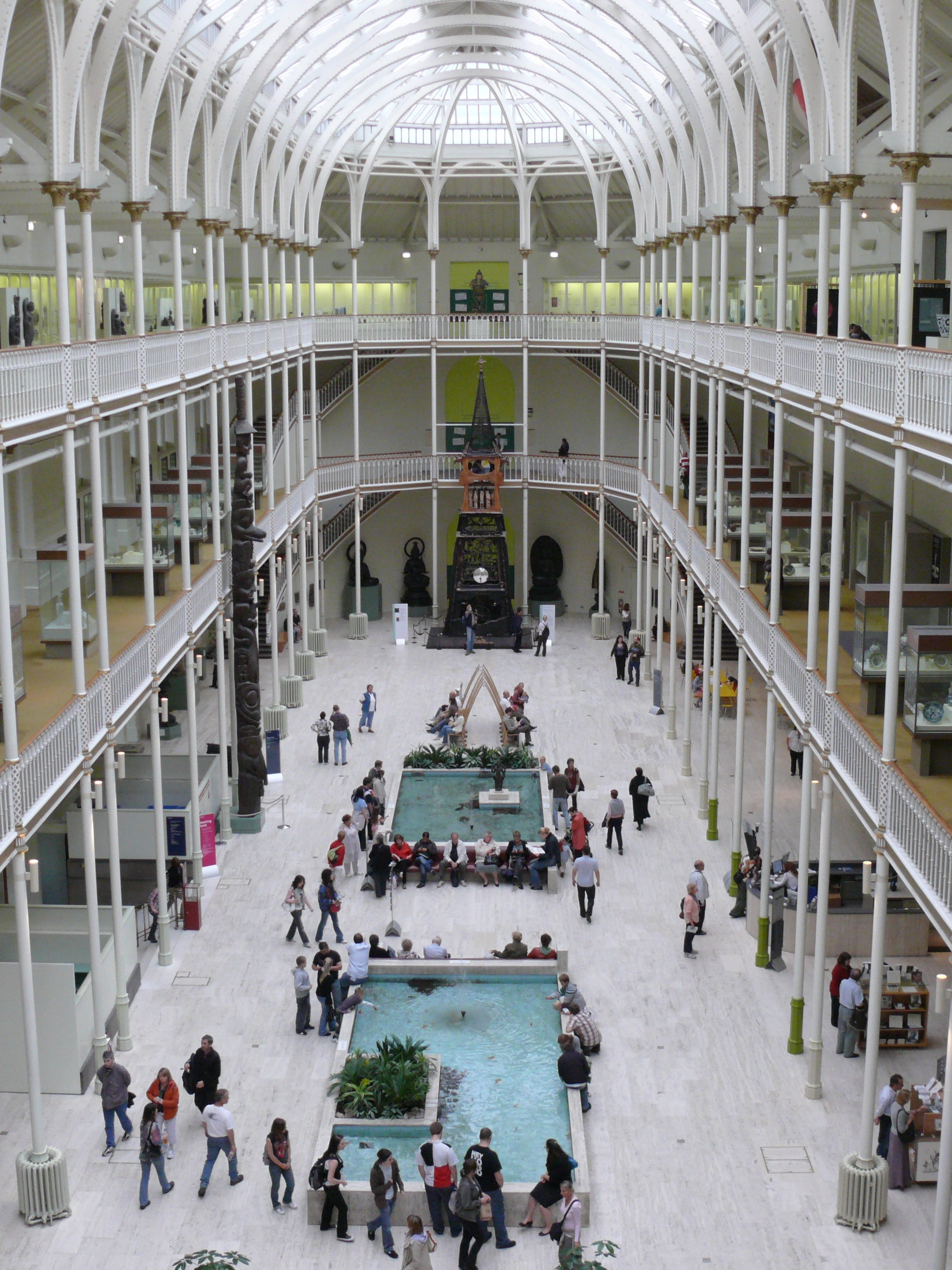
Edinburgh Museum of Science and Art (Royal Museum), main hall

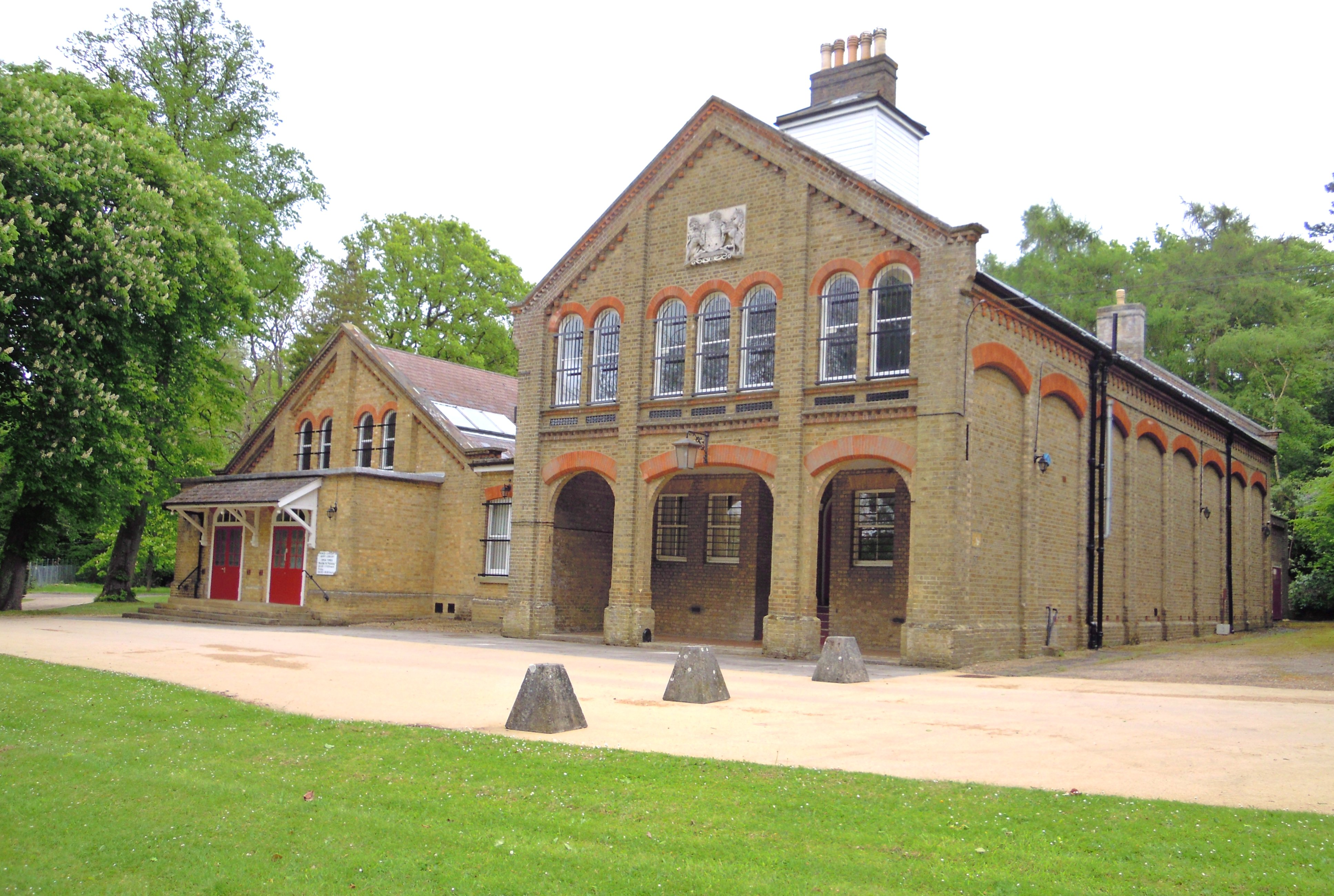
The Prince Consort's Library in Aldershot, Hampshire
