= Barbizon 63 =

Condominium building in Manhattan, New York

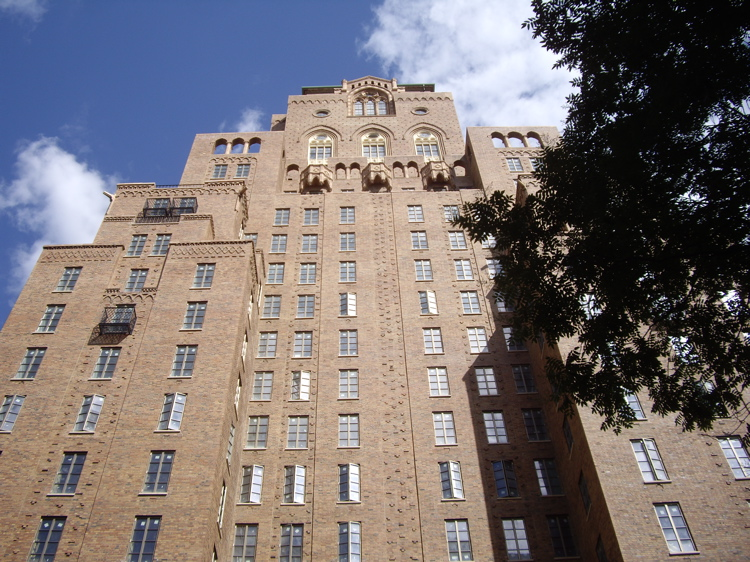
- (2007)
- Former names: Barbizon Hotel for Women
- Etymology: Barbizon artistic movement

General information
- Type: Condominiums (mixed residential and commercial)
- Architectural style: Italian Renaissance, Late Gothic Revival, and Romanesque
- Location: 140 East 63rd Street, Manhattan, New York, United States
- Coordinates: 40°45′52″N 73°57′58″W
- Construction started: March 1927
- Completed: February 1928
- Opened: October 31, 1927
- Renovated: 1980–1984 (converted to mixed-gender hotel); 2005 (converted to condominiums)
- Cost: $4 million (1927)

Technical details
- Floor count: 23
- Floor area: 175,623 ft^{2} (16,315.9 m^{2})
- Grounds: 13,136 ft^{2} (1,220.4 m^{2})

Design and construction
- Architects: Palmer H. Ogden, Everett F. Murgatroyd
- Barbizon Hotel for Women
- U.S. National Register of Historic Places
- U.S. Historic district – Contributing property
- New York State Register of Historic Places
- New York City Landmark
- Part of: Upper East Side Historic District (ID06000822)
- NRHP reference No.: 82001186
- NYSRHP No.: 06101.001673
- NYCL No.: 2495

Significant dates
- Added to NRHP: October 29, 1982
- Designated NYSRHP: September 15, 1982
- Designated NYCL: April 17, 2012

Barbizon 63 (formerly the Barbizon Hotel for Women and the Melrose Hotel) is a mostly residential condominium building at 140 East 63rd Street, at the southeast corner with Lexington Avenue, on the Upper East Side of Manhattan in New York City. The 23-story hotel was designed by Everett F. Murgatroyd and Palmer H. Ogden in a blend of the Italian Renaissance, Late Gothic Revival, and Islamic styles. From 1927 until 1981, it was a women-only residential hotel. The Barbizon is listed on the National Register of Historic Places and is a New York City designated landmark.

The facade consists of salmon-colored brick, with limestone and terra cotta decorations, and is divided into a three-story base, a 15-story shaft, and a five-story tower. The building contains numerous setbacks, as well as a light court to the east, and the upper stories contain large arched windows. When the Barbizon was built, it contained various amenities for its residents, including a gymnasium, private library, solarium, swimming pool, and Victorian-style Turkish baths. Generally, men were only permitted to enter the ground-level stores, the double-height lobby, and the mezzanine-level recital room. The upper stories originally contained 655 bedrooms, which were eventually downsized to 306 hotel rooms, then to 66 condominiums. The modern-day condominium building contains a three-story Equinox Fitness club at its base.

The Allerton Hotel chain, headed by William Silk, developed the Barbizon on the site of a synagogue that dated from the 1870s. The hotel opened on October 31, 1927, and initially catered to women who worked in the arts. The building was sold twice in the 1930s and was profitable by the end of that decade. Between the 1930s and the 1960s, the hotel hosted numerous clubs, and entities such as Mademoiselle magazine, the Katharine Gibbs Secretarial School, and the Ford Modeling Agency rented rooms there. After the Barbizon's occupancy rate began to decline in the 1970s, the hotel was refurbished. The Barbizon was sold three times between 1979 and 1981, and it started accepting male guests on February 14, 1981. The hotel underwent further renovations in the 1980s, during which it was sold twice more. Metromedia acquired the Barbizon in 1995 from Ian Schrager, partially renovated it, then sold it back to Schrager in 1998. The Berwind Property Group bought the hotel in 2001 and renovated it further before converting the building to condos between 2005 and 2006.

== Description ==
Barbizon 63, originally the Barbizon Hotel for Women, is at the southeast corner of Lexington Avenue and 63rd Street on the Upper East Side of Manhattan in New York City. It occupies a trapezoidal site with a frontage of 120 feet (37 m) on 63rd Street and 124 feet (38 m) on Lexington Avenue. The site has a total area of 13,136 square feet (1,220.4 m^{2}). The Barbara Rutherford Hatch House is immediately to the east. The building was designated a New York City landmark on April 17, 2012.

The Barbizon was designed by the firm of Everett F. Murgatroyd and Palmer H. Ogden, who designed the Allerton Hotel for Women and Barbizon-Plaza Hotel in New York City and the Hotel Allerton in Chicago. The structure is faced in salmon-colored brick with limestone and terra cotta decorations. The hotel's architecture combines elements of the Italian Renaissance, Late Gothic Revival, and Romanesque styles.

=== Form and facade ===
The Barbizon is 23 stories high. Its facade is divided into three horizontal sections: a three-story base, a 15-story shaft, and a five-story tower that is set back significantly from the shaft. The base occupies nearly the whole site and is rectangular. Above the third story, the south elevation of the facade is visible; there is a light court at the center of the south elevation. The east elevation is also visible above the fifth story; there are various setbacks and smaller light courts on the north, west, and east elevations. The facade mostly retains its original design, but openings for air conditioners have been cut into various parts of the facade.

==== Base ====
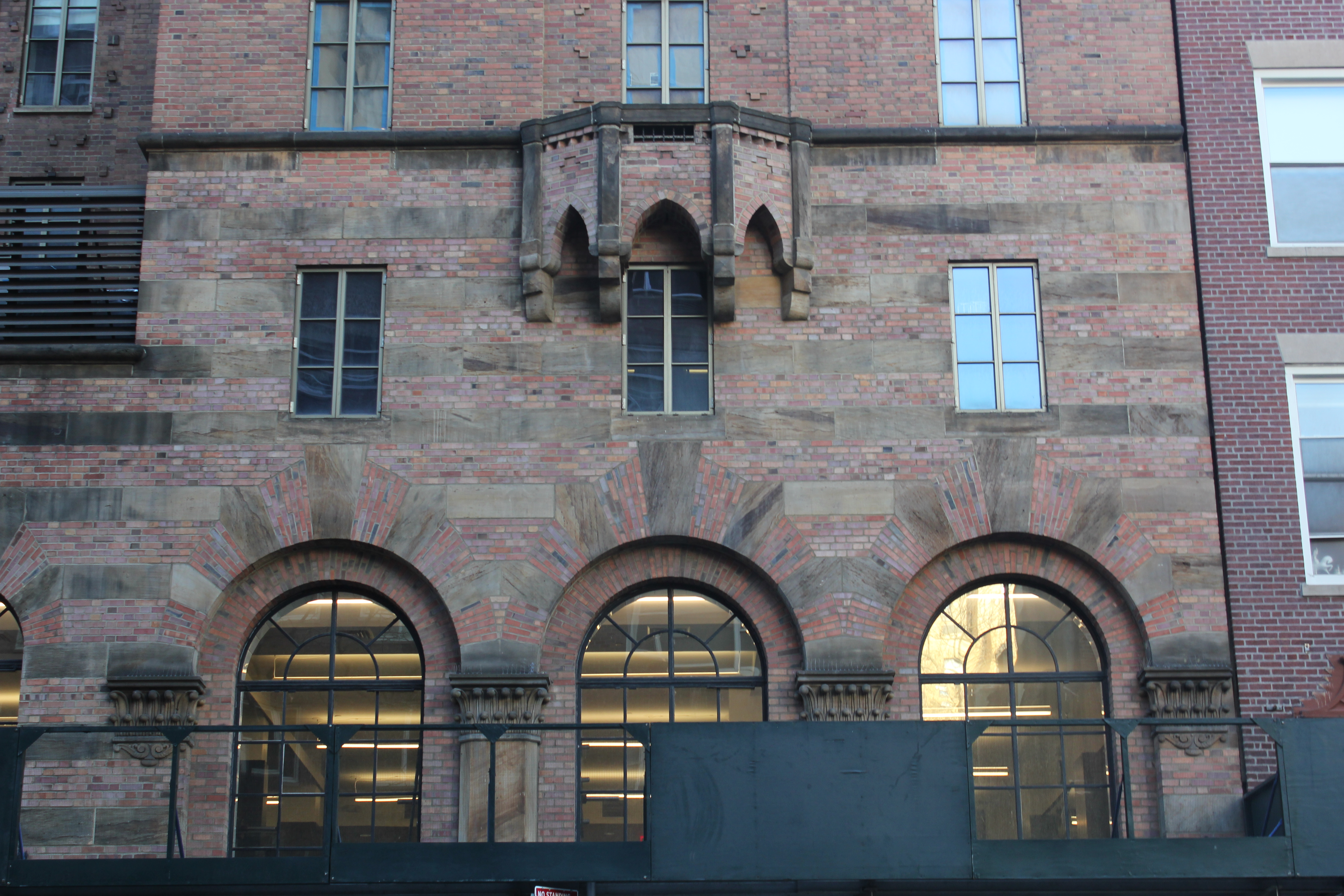
The second and third stories of the "corner pavilion" on Lexington Avenue

The lowest section of the facade, immediately above the sidewalk, consists of a stone water table. Above the water table, the facade contains alternating stone and brick bands. The north elevation on 63rd Street measures 11 bays wide, while the west elevation on Lexington Avenue is 10 bays wide. The first two stories contain arcades supported by Romanesque-style pilasters made of stone and brick or of plain stone. Each pilaster is topped by Corinthian-style capitals that contain acanthus leaf motifs. The first-story windows and storefronts have been modified over the years, but many of the original second-story casement windows and arched transom windows remain in place.

The three center bays on 63rd Street comprise the main entrance, which is accessed by a set of stone steps. At some point after the building opened, the original metal-and-glass double doors were replaced. The main entrance was originally topped by a balcony, but this has since been replaced by a marquee. The 30-foot-long bronze marquee, designed in the Art Deco style and installed in 1940, contained cut-outs of the letters "Barbizon". The entrance is flanked by rectangular windows with Gothic-style frames. The easternmost bay of the 63rd Street elevation contains a service doorway, while the westernmost three bays contain large storefronts with canopies and wall sconces. The second-story windows contain projecting sills with wrought-iron grilles. Above the second story, the center three bays are flanked by a pair of stone corbels, which originally carried flagpoles.

On Lexington Avenue, the ground story only contains storefronts. The design of the first two stories is similar to that of the outer bays on 63rd Street. However, the third and ninth bays from the north have doorways with projecting canopies, while the other bays contain canopies and wall sconces. The doorways on Lexington Avenue lead to the hotel's fitness center. Above the second-story setback on Lexington Avenue is a metal fence, behind which are HVAC equipment.

==== Upper stories ====
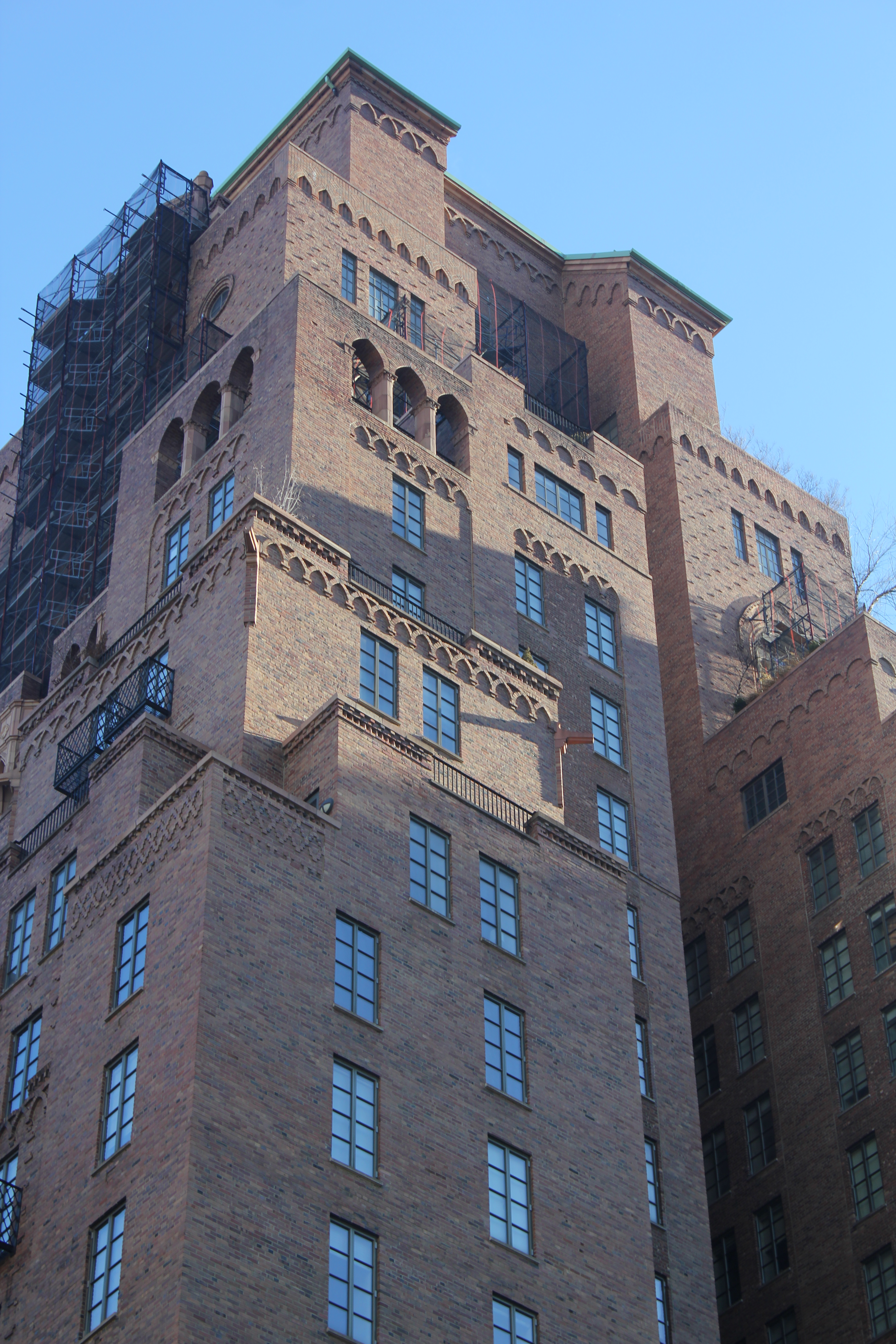
Facade of the upper stories

The four corners of the building are designed in a manner similar to turrets. On the 63rd Street elevation, the five center bays are set back above the second story, while the outermost three bays continue upward as "corner pavilions". In the center bay of each corner pavilion, there is an angular brick-and-stone balcony above the third story. Similar decorations are present on the corner pavilions of the Lexington Avenue elevation. The east and south elevations are asymmetrical. The light court at the center of the south elevation measures five bays wide and six bays deep; this splits the south elevation into a western wing measuring three bays wide and an eastern wing measuring four bays wide. The north, east, and west elevations all have six setbacks. On these elevations, the intermediate stories contain cruciform niches and projecting bricks, while the setbacks are marked by arched Gothic Revival–style corbel tables and trellises.

On the north, west, and south elevations, as well as on the northern part of the east elevation, the third through 17th stories are accented by vertical brick corbels and horizontal corbel bands. The eastern light court, and some of the windows on the southern part of the east elevation, contain darker brick. Over the years, many the windows on all four elevations have been lengthened, while some windows on the east and south elevations have been sealed. The north elevation contains iron balconies at the 10th and 14th stories, as well as brick parapets at the 12th and 15th stories, parts of which have been replaced with metal balustrades. Some of the brick parapets on the east elevation have also been replaced at the 12th, 14th, and 19th stories; in addition, there are spherical lamps on the east elevation above some of the 13th- and 16th-story windows.

According to Robert A. M. Stern, the top six stories were designed similarly to a chapel. The 18th through 23rd stories originally featured multi-paned casement windows. The terraces on the 18th floor contain iron balconies and open loggias, and the west side of the 19th floor contained an outdoor solarium. The north, west, and east elevations contain brick corbels on the 18th through 23rd stories, which form a diaper pattern. The 19th and 20th stories contain three double-height arches, topped by molded brick hoods and archivolts; each archway contains iron-framed windows with ornamental spandrel panels. On the north and west elevations, the center of the 21st story contains round windows, which flank a double-height arched dormer with a gable and a brick and stone frame. The dormer, spanning the 21st and 22nd stories, contains a multi-light sash window topped by a quatrefoil. The east and south elevations also have double-height windows at the center of the 21st and 22nd stories. The 22nd story has a parapet with machicolations on all four sides. At the 23rd story, all four elevations contain louvers instead of windows. The building is topped by a standing-seam copper hip roof.

=== Interior ===
The building's two basement levels, as well as the first two stories, occupy the entire site. At the 18th floor, a terrace wraps around the Barbizon's tower stories, which taper to 25,000 square feet (2,300 m^{2}). The building contained various amenities for its residents, including a gymnasium, private library, solarium, swimming pool, and Turkish bath. According to the New York City Department of City Planning, the modern-day building contains 175,623 square feet (16,315.9 m^{2}), split across 86 residential condominiums and two non-residential condominiums.

==== Public rooms ====
The main entrance on 63rd Street originally led to a double-height lobby, which was surrounded by a balcony. The lobby was designed in a northern Italian style; the original decorations have since been removed. When the Barbizon was converted into a mixed-gender hotel in 1981, the upper portion of the lobby was converted into a palm court, with a 200-seat restaurant and bar. At ground level, there were also eight stores on Lexington Avenue, such as a bookshop, milliner, pharmacy, hosiery store, dry cleaner, and hairdresser. All these stores could be accessed both from the street and from inside.

On the second floor, behind the lobby, was an English-style recital room with wood paneling. The room could fit 300 people and hosted performances by both residents and established musical artists. The south wall contained a stained-glass window with a depiction of the Barbizon, above which was a broken pediment commemorating the Barbizon's completion in 1927. On the east wall was a church organ, which had 600 pipes. The organ was seldom used after 1947 and was completely abandoned in the early 1970s; it was restored in 1982.

The swimming pool, in the basement, was clad with ceramic tile and measured 25 by 60 feet (7.6 by 18.3 m). The pool, occupying a double-height space, was completely closed for about 15 years and was used as storage space. By the 1970s, there was a health club adjacent to the pool. The health club had been incorporated into a three-level fitness center, operated by Equinox, by the late 1990s. The fitness center has been variously cited as spanning 34,000 square feet (3,200 m^{2}), 35,000 square feet (3,300 m^{2}), or 40,000 square feet (3,700 m^{2}). The pool's dimensions were modified to 21 by 65 feet (6.4 by 19.8 m), and a whirlpool, steam room, showers, and hot and cold plunges were added next to the pool. The fitness center also contains a juice bar and cafe on the first floor, as well as workout rooms and consultants' offices on the second floor.

The Barbizon's upper stories included a 3,000-volume library, as well as a soundproof, double-height rehearsal room on the 19th story. Other amenities included an art gallery, music rooms, and handball and basketball courts; later on, the building also had a television room. When the Barbizon was converted to condominiums in 2006, its owners added a salon, a dining and reception area, a library, and a screening room with 20 seats.

==== Club rooms ====
When the building opened, the 18th floor contained a clubhouse for the Wellesley College of New York, which served graduates of the women's liberal-arts school Wellesley College. The clubhouse contained 20 bedrooms, a large lounge, a dining room, a drawing room, and outdoor terraces facing south and west. The 20th through 22nd floors contained the headquarters of the Association of Junior Leagues of America. The 21st floor contained a clubroom with white decorations, red upholstery, blue carpets, and a fireplace, in addition to executive offices. The 20th story hosted the offices of Junior League Magazine, while the 22nd story contained headquarters for several subsidiaries of the Association of Junior Leagues.

==== Guestrooms and condominiums ====
The average room measured 9 by 12 feet (2.7 by 3.7 m) across, and most rooms did not have their own bathroom. There were 655 rooms in total. This consisted of 130 "private rooms", which had their own bathrooms; 47 pairs of "semiprivate rooms", which shared a bathroom; and 431 "pension rooms", whose occupants had to walk down a hallway to use the bathroom. As late as 1981, forty-five percent of the rooms lacked private bathrooms. Each room had a dresser, bed, lamp, armchair, and small desk, as well as a radio. None of the bedrooms initially contained televisions. By the late 1940s, the rooms all had telephones, in addition to other features such as reading lamps and large closets. The furniture was described as being in a "modern French" style, with "highly feminine boudoirs".

When the Barbizon was converted to a mixed-gender hotel in 1981, its 544 vacant rooms were converted into 461 guestrooms. Each of the vacant pension rooms was combined with another pension room, doubling its size. Even so, many of the rooms continued to have shared bathrooms; in particular, there was one bathroom for every two semiprivate rooms and every four pension rooms. A women-only wing for existing residents, which contained 150 rooms, was created on the 4th through 11th floors. In the 1990s, the rooms were redecorated in pastel colors, and the top two floors were converted into seven luxury "spa suites". Other guestrooms on the upper floors were rebranded as "tower suites", which included features such as Jacuzzis and outdoor terraces.

Since 2006, the building has contained 66 condominiums. These include apartments with between one and three bedrooms, as well as five penthouse units that vary in size from 680 to 5,000 square feet (63 to 465 m^{2}). The residences contain decorations such as floor moldings, rosewood floors, and 6-foot-tall (1.8 m) double-paned windows. All of the condominiums above the 11th floor have different layouts. The topmost penthouse, a duplex on the 22nd and 23rd floors.

== History ==
Developers started constructing speculative developments on the Upper East Side in the late 19th century, and many upper-class families had moved to the neighborhood by the beginning of the 20th century. Temple Beth-El, one of several synagogues that had relocated from the Lower East Side northward during the late 19th century, had relocated to the southeast corner of 63rd Street and Lexington Avenue in 1873. Temple Rodeph Sholom acquired the synagogue in 1892. During the early 20th century, the open-air Park Avenue main line was placed in a tunnel, and the New York City Subway was built in the area, spurring further high-rise development around Lexington Avenue. This prompted The New York Times to say in 1923 that Lexington Avenue was "undergoing a transformation very similar to that which has made Park Avenue within recent years the most magnificent apartment house thoroughfare in the world".

In the years following World War I, there had been a great increase in the number of female college students, who had long been underrepresented in higher education compared to their male counterparts. Most of these women planned to go into business, professional or social-science careers after graduation, so they planned to move to urban areas with suitable jobs. However, there was a shortage of housing units available in New York City due to inflation and rent controls implemented during World War I, and the few available apartments tended to be overly expensive. Moreover, options such as hotels and lodges tended to be biased toward men, while self-supporting women's homes mostly catered toward the immigrants and the working class. Just prior to the Barbizon's construction, only three women's hotels in the city accommodated businesswomen: the Martha Washington Hotel, the Rutledge Hotel, and the Allerton Hotel.

=== Development ===
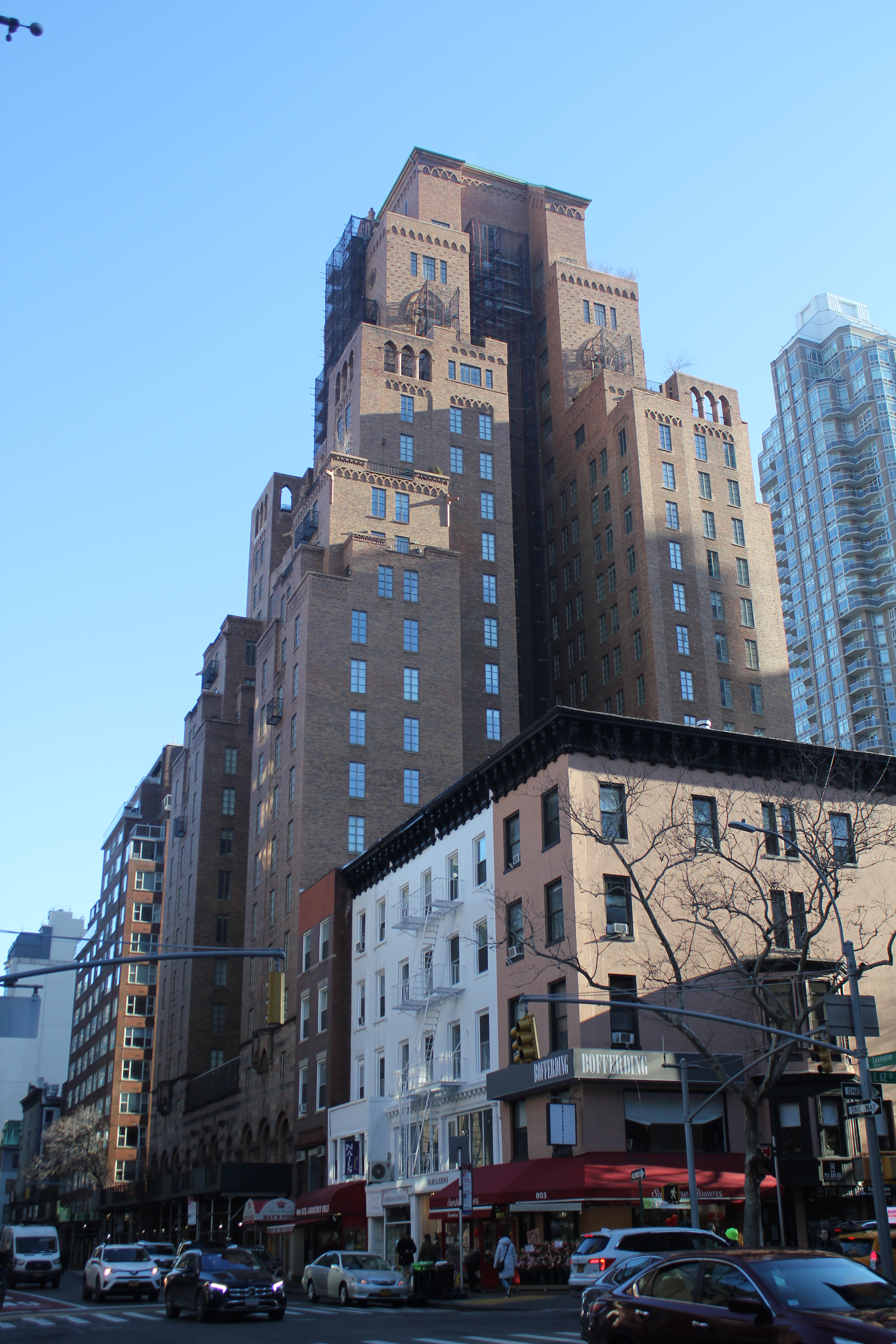
View of the Barbizon from 62nd Street and Lexington Avenue

In January 1926, the trustees of Temple Rodeph Sholom voted to sell their 92-by-120-foot (28 by 37 m) site on the southeast corner of Lexington Avenue and 63rd Street to the Amri Realty Company, which planned to build an apartment hotel there. Amri's president, Bernard Reich, hired Emery Roth to design the new building since, at the time, the surrounding neighborhood did not have any apartment hotels. A judge approved the sale of the synagogue that April. Concurrently, the Simon brothers and the Hartstein brothers also acquired a neighboring structure at 813 Lexington Avenue. Simon, Hartstein, and Bernard Reich had planned to jointly develop a structure known as the St. Nazaire, but Simon and Hartstein bought out Reich's interest in July 1926. This gave Simon and Hartstein a site of 112 by 120 feet (34 by 37 m).

Amri sought to sell the synagogue and the Lexington Avenue structure to the Allerton Hotel chain, headed by William Silk, by September 1926. The sale was finalized the next month for $5 million. Silk planned to construct an 18-story apartment hotel for women, known as the Barbizon, with 700 apartments as well as 16 storefronts on the lowest two floors. The hotel was named after the Barbizon artistic movement of the 19th century, which in turn was named after the French commune of Barbizon. Hughes and Hammond placed a $1.85 million construction loan on the site later the same month. The architecture firm of Murgatroyd & Ogden submitted plans to the New York City Department of Buildings in December 1926. The next month, the developers announced that they had received a $1.85 million construction loan from William Henry Barnum Co.

Construction began in March 1927, and Silk received a $3 million first-mortgage loan from Hughes and Hammond that October. Advertisements for the new apartment building began to appear in local media in September 1927, and the hotel began accepting applications from potential residents on September 15. Initially, the Barbizon was scheduled to open "on or about" October 15. The Barbizon Hotel for Women ultimately opened on October 31, 1927, though it was not completed until February 1928. At the time of the building's opening, more than one thousand women had expressed interest in living at the Barbizon. The Wellesley Club of New York had rented 20 rooms, while the Four Arts Wing contained 100 rooms for art students. The structure had cost $4 million in total.

=== Women's hotel ===
When the Barbizon opened, the upper floors were restricted to women. Traditionally, men were only allowed to enter the lobby, dining room, and recital room; they could obtain a visitor pass for the mezzanine or the 18th floor. This rule was aimed at boyfriends but also applied to family members. The hotel contained "beau rooms" for residents to meet with their boyfriends. Doctors and those in service trades, such as electricians and plumbers, were the only men who were allowed to visit the residential floors. Elevator operators and security guards enforced the hotel's women-only rule.

Unlike the Allerton and Martha Washington hotels, the Barbizon targeted women who worked in the arts; many residents worked for magazines or at nearby stores. All potential residents had to provide three references and undergo an interview. Assistant manager Mae Sibley interviewed every applicant, ensuring that the prospective resident was "presentable" and of "good and moral character". Residents were then classified into one of three groups (A, B, and C) based on their age; group A was the youngest, while group C was the oldest. (Note: Sources disagree on the cutoff for each group. According to author Paulina Bren and a 1977 New York Times article, group A was under age 28, group B was between the ages of 28 and 38, and group C was over age 38. According to the hotel's manager Barry Mann, group A was under age 25, group B was between the ages of 25 and 40, and group C was over age 40.) Women in group A were typically given private rooms, women in group B usually stayed in rooms with shared bathrooms, and women in group C usually were rejected. Prospective residents were also classified into one of two groups based on their appearance. Younger women could still be rejected if they were unattractive, while older, attractive women were sometimes accepted. In the hotel's first few decades, all the residents were well-to-do white women. This led the hotel to be called "New York's Most Exclusive Hotel Residence for Young Women".

Residents had to adhere to strict rules: for example, they had to sign a logbook in the lobby when they exited or entered, and there was a 10 p.m. curfew. In addition, residents had to maintain a "ladylike appearance". Various events such as organ recitals, contract bridge games, and afternoon tea were provided for residents, and the hotel even had its own social director. Paulina Bren wrote that the hotel's residents formed a social network and that women "felt empowered just by being at the Barbizon".

==== Early operation ====
An early advertisement in The New Yorker magazine proclaimed that "The Barbizon has become the latest accepted rendezvous for the art and music-loving young set", due to the large number of clubs that were headquartered at the Barbizon. In addition to the Wellesley Club of New York and Four Arts Wing, the Barbizon contained the clubhouses for alumni of Mount Holyoke College and Cornell University. These clubs sponsored music recitals at the Barbizon, which radio station WOR-FM started broadcasting in early 1928. The Arts Council of New York moved to the Barbizon's mezzanine shortly after it opened, and the Association of Junior Leagues of America relocated its national headquarters to the building in mid-1928. The Barbizon Players and the Irish Theatre also performed in the building's auditorium, and the Barbizon Book and Pen Club met in the library.

By the 1930 United States census, the Barbizon's residents included actresses, interior designers, fashion illustrators, models, and singers. Women working in non-artistic trades also lived at the Barbizon, including statisticians, clerks, librarians, nurses, secretaries, and teachers. After the Barbizon Corporation defaulted on the building's first mortgage, Chase National Bank acquired the Barbizon in August 1931, becoming its trustee. Chase National appointed Edward H. Crandall as the Barbizon's new manager, and Silk paid the bank nearly $39,000 to manage the building. Although the city government had appraised the hotel at $2.95 million, Chase argued that the Barbizon was worth only two-thirds that. A bondholders' committee led by real-estate agent Lawrence B. Elliman bought the Barbizon at an auction in July 1932, bidding $460,000 for the hotel and $28,000 for the furnishings. The East River Savings Bank placed a $400,000, five-year mortgage loan on the Barbizon the same month, and the bondholders' committee formed a new organization, Hotel Barbizon Inc., to operate the hotel.

The Katharine Gibbs Secretarial School had rented the 16th floor for its students in 1930, and it expanded to the 17th floor around 1934. The dormitory had its own lounge and cafeteria, although its occupants were also allowed to use the amenity spaces on the 22nd floor. Barbizon Hotel Inc. received a $250,000 loan from Pease & Elliman in May 1935. The hotel was profitable by 1938, and the 1939 New York World's Fair further increased the Barbizon's business. Informational pamphlets from 1939 described the Barbizon as "a cultural and social center in itself" and emphasized the building's proximity to the subway, theaters, stores, and the World's Fair, as well as the presence of cultural attractions such as the Metropolitan Museum of Art, Carnegie Hall, and Radio City Music Hall. To protect views from the east, the Hotel Barbizon Inc. acquired an adjacent house on 63rd Street in 1939.

==== 1940s to 1960s ====
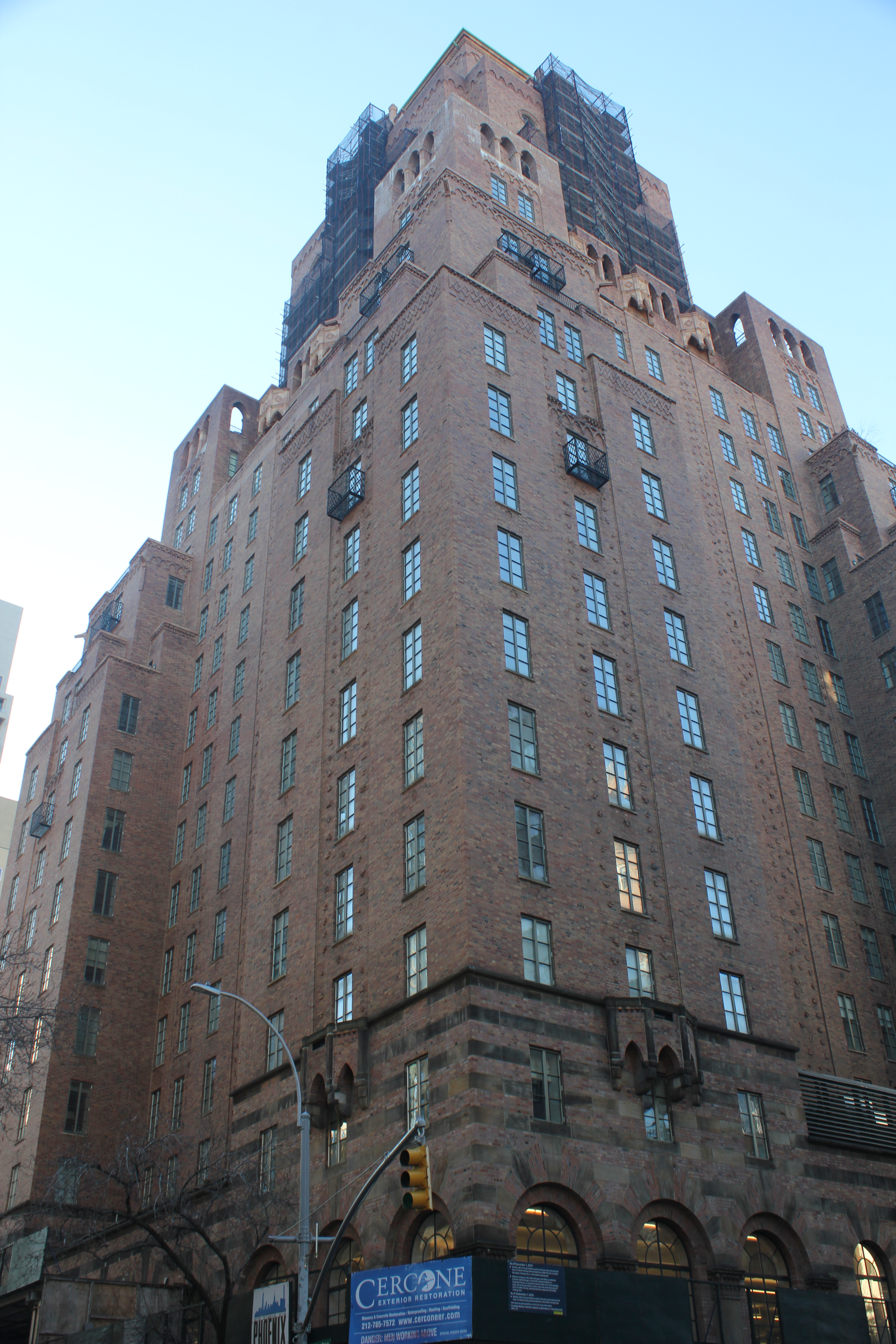
Upper-story facade at 63rd Street and Lexington Avenue

The hotel's owners paid off the $400,000 mortgage in February 1940, and a marquee designed by Schwartz & Gross was installed above the entrance that May. Milton A. Kimmelman and George Zauderer bought the Barbizon in 1944, and Hugh Connor became the hotel's manager the same year. Mademoiselle magazine also began housing its guest editors at the Barbizon in 1944; the program, which mentored 20 interns per year, operated for the next three-and-a-half decades. At the time, weekly rent at the hotel averaged $12 for rooms with running water or $15 for rooms with private bathrooms; for an extra $4 monthly fee, women could rent art and music studios for one hour per day. Bren wrote that the Barbizon's women-only policy allowed Mademoiselle's editors the "freedom to come to New York and get a head start on their own lives as career women". The Ford Modeling Agency started housing its models at the Barbizon in the late 1940s. The hotel acquired another house on Lexington Avenue in 1948 and resold it two years later.

By 1949, the hotel housed 700 women, and its waiting list had 100 more names; the average resident was an unmarried 23-year-old. Many of the hotel's residents were studying in such disparate fields as singing, merchandising, and brain surgery. Music students could rent the hotel's soundproof studios for $6.50 a month, while art students could display their artwork in the mezzanine for free. Women could rent single rooms for $18 to $27 per week, or they could occupy a double room with a roommate for $15 per week; this excluded the cost of meals in each room. The artist Barbara Chase may have become the first Black woman to live at the Barbizon in 1956.

The Barbizon continued to attract young women through the 1950s and 1960s, including students of the Parsons School of Design and the Tobe-Coburn School for Fashion Careers. An advertisement in The New Yorker in 1966 claimed that "many of the world's most successful women were Barbizon girls". The Barbizon had 600 residents during this time, and Connor remained as its manager. The hotel remained profitable until the late 1960s, at which point the hotel's practices had become dated. The Barbizon still requested that potential tenants provide three references, but it refused to accept credit-card payments, and the lobby needed refurbishment.

==== 1970s ====
The New York City government enacted a law in 1970 that banned gender discrimination in public places. The city's Human Rights Commission ruled in 1972 that hotels such as the Barbizon were not exempt from this law. The commission asked the Barbizon to start accepting male residents, but the New York City Council later passed an amendment exempting single-sex residential hotels from the law. Meanwhile, the Katharine Gibbs School had closed its dormitory at the Barbizon in the early 1970s, which caused occupancy to decrease significantly. When Connor resigned as the hotel's manager in 1972, the Barbizon was unprofitable, and its occupancy rate had declined to 40 percent. The hotel's restaurant continued to operate in the early 1970s, but management closed the hotel's library, coffee shop, and restaurant. The construction of the 63rd Street subway lines was causing significant disruption to the hotel's business. Assistant manager Mae Sibley told The Wall Street Journal that occupancy rates had decreased because young women "haven't any morals anymore". Other women's hotels in New York City also had low occupancy rates, but this was due to reduced tourism and the fact that many single-sex hotels had restrictive policies, which many women sought to avoid.

By the mid-1970s, the hotel rented rooms on a daily, weekly, or monthly basis, and about 130 rent-controlled residents were still living at the Barbizon. Late the following year, the hotel's managers hired marketing consultant David M. Teitelbaum, who ended the hotel's practice of classifying residents and began distributing advertisements. Working with the hotel's manager Barry Mann, Teitelbaum spent $500,000 to renovate the hotel, including removing furniture from the lobby. Workers built a laundry room, relocated the library, and renovated the reception room, and they generally renovated ten rooms a week. Workers also renovated the restaurant and coffee shop; repainted various interior spaces, restored the plasterwork and carpeting; and added TVs, washing machines, and dryers. A women's health club, serving both residents and non-resident members, was also opened next to the swimming pool. Residents could rent mini-fridges for their rooms, and they received discounted health-club memberships.

Although the construction of the subway caused noise pollution, the building's managers reported in 1976 that its occupancy rates were increasing. The hotel was 90 percent occupied by its 50th anniversary in October 1977, even as rents had been increased to between $13 and $22 per day. The rooms were marketed to young women who were beginning their careers; the average resident lived there for three months. Seventy percent of residents were under the age of 40, but most of the women who were at least 40 years old lived in rent-controlled or rent-stabilized rooms and were protected from rent increases. About half of tenants rented rooms by the week, while 15 percent of guests only stayed there for a few nights. The Chicago Tribune wrote that the hotel still had a "homey atmosphere", with a "moderately priced coffee shop and restaurant". The Metropolitan Transportation Authority had rented space in the sub-basement and third story for 63rd Street subway workers, mostly men, who had their own entrance. The Barbizon had an occupancy rate above 90 percent in 1979, higher than in comparable mixed-gender hotels, but the occupancy rate quickly decreased after the hotel raised its rents.

=== Conversion to mixed-gender hotel ===
William Zeckendorf Jr. bought the building in February 1979 for $7 million. Zeckendorf planned to convert the Barbizon to rental apartments as part of New York City's J-51 tax-abatement program. Under Zeckendorf's ownership, the hotel stopped renting rooms by the week or month. Saudi businessman Fuad Abdalla, as well as Indian company Oberoi Hotel Management Group, were considering buying the Barbizon by November 1979; at the time, Abdalla and Oberoi had made a down payment of $1 million and had promised to pay another $8.5 million. Barbilex Associates, composed of Abdulla and Oberoi, finalized their purchase in May 1980 for approximately $10 million. Teitelbaum continued to manage the Barbizon. The owners announced in mid-1980 that they would either start accepting male guests or convert the hotel to long-term apartments or offices. By then, the hotel's occupancy rate had decreased to 64 percent, even as other hotels in New York City were fully booked.

In September 1980, Barbilex announced that it planned to close the hotel at the beginning of January 1981 and relocate all residents to other buildings. This prompted protests from the hotel's remaining long-term residents. Many of the 114 residents were elderly, and 14 of the residents were protected by rent control, while the other 100 lived in rent-stabilized rooms. Barbilex withdrew its original plans and converted the Barbizon into a 461-room hotel, renovating one floor at a time. Barbilex also created a women-only wing, which was physically segregated from the rest of the hotel. Half of the residents moved to the women-only wing, while the other half stayed in their existing apartments. The renovation was to cost $10 million.

Barbilex announced in January 1981 that the Barbizon would become a mixed-gender hotel, rather than be converted into offices or apartments. The Barbizon Hotel for Women dropped the last two words in its name and started accepting male guests on February 14, 1981, coinciding with Valentine's Day. The first man to stay at the Barbizon was David Cleveland, a doctor from Massachusetts who had won a raffle. Other sources cite publisher David Hershkovits as the first man to sleep at the Barbizon. At the time, guestrooms with private bathrooms rented for about $40 to $69 per night, while guestrooms with shared bathrooms were generally cheaper.

=== Transient hotel ===
==== 1980s ====
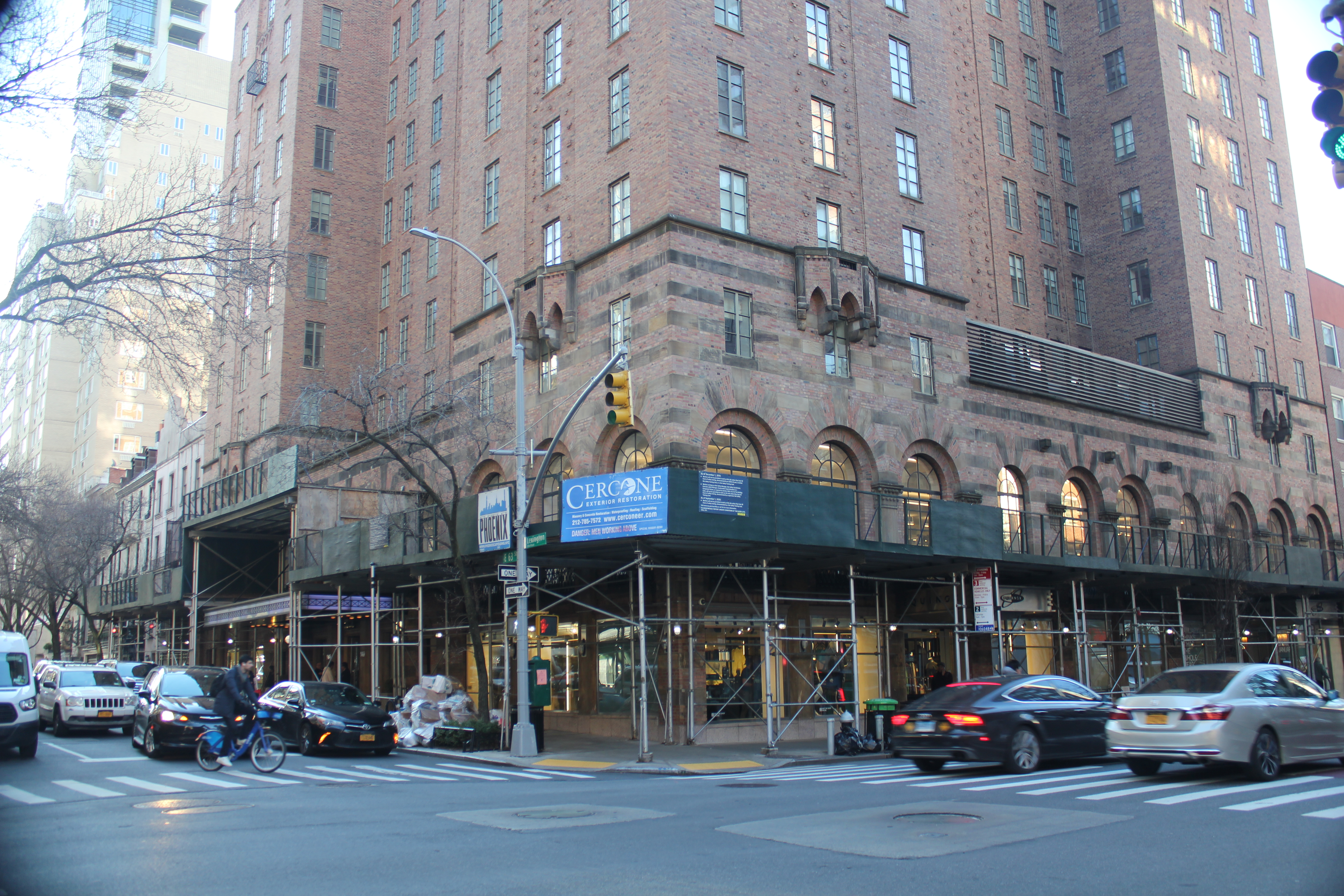
Ground-level storefronts at 63rd Street and Lexington Avenue

Teitelbaum bought the hotel from Barbilex in September 1981 and announced that he would close the hotel that December for a yearlong renovation. The project cost $20 million, although the federal government gave the hotel a $4 million tax credit, which reduced the cost of the renovation. A full spa was built around the swimming pool in the basement, and the bar and lobby were also re-clad with pink marble. The top five stories were planned to be converted to four residential condominiums, each with between one and four bedrooms, which would have been placed for sale in August 1982; these condominiums were never built. The lower stories were converted to 360 guestrooms. The hotel reopened in phases; about 100 of the rooms had reopened by September 1982. However, the rest of the renovation was delayed in 1983 due to the early 1980s recession in the United States.

Golden Tulip, a subsidiary of Dutch airline KLM, took over the hotel in 1983. By April 1984, Golden Tulip had rebranded the hotel as the Golden Tulip Barbizon and was spending $60 million to complete the renovation. At the time, 300 of the guestrooms were open to the public. The company hired architect David Kenneth Specter and interior designer Judith Stockman to finish the renovation, which included three restaurants, a ground-level retail arcade, and a health club at the base. The recital room was converted into an event space known as the Rousseau Room. Golden Tulip also canceled the planned condominiums on the upper stories. Golden Tulip operated the Barbizon as a regular short-term hotel, although some long-term residents remained there. According to a 1985 article in The Morning Call in Allentown, Pennsylvania, the Barbizon was advertised as "elegant but not formal, urbane but not urban, romantic but not precious."

Golden Tulip agreed in August 1988 to sell its majority stake in the hotel to Philip Pilevsky and Arthur G. Cohen. Contemporary media reported that the hotel was to be sold for $60 million. Pilevsky and Cohen—in partnership with nightclub operators Ian Schrager and Steve Rubell, who had operated the Studio 54 nightclub—finalized their purchase of the hotel that November, paying "under $50 million". The four men planned to spend at least $10 million on renovating the hotel into a European-inspired "urban spa", which Schrager said would "be a sanctuary, a total atmosphere". The owners attempted to fire all of the hotel's 150 workers, but an arbitrator forced the men to rehire the employees several hours later. The employees had been part of a labor union, and Rubell claimed that he had fired the employees so the union would be more willing to negotiate. When Rubell died in 1989, Schrager continued to operate the hotel alone through the Morgans Hotel Group (MHG). Pilevsky considered selling the hotels that he had co-owned with Rubell and Schrager, including the Barbizon, Morgans, Paramount, and Royalton. By then, the Barbizon had a 72 percent occupancy rate, lower than that of the chain's other hotels. Schrager denied that his hotels were for sale.

==== 1990s ====
The Barbizon's manager and controller had both resigned by early 1990. At the time, the hotel's operators were trying to attract conferences and conventions. Another renovation of the hotel started in July 1990; at the time, the project was supposed to be completed in 1992. Schrager and Pilevsky fell behind on paying city taxes on the property, and they owed $1.9 million by 1991. Ultimately, Schrager was forced to give up the Barbizon in 1993. The Bank of Tokyo Ltd., which took over the Barbizon and Morgans hotels, influenced Schrager and Pilevsky to sell both hostelries. The hotelier Bernard Goldberg opted not to buy the Barbizon because he felt its $20 million asking price was too high.

John W. Kluge, president of Metromedia, bought the Barbizon in 1995 for $19 million. Metromedia conducted some renovations but did not complete the project. The renovation was variously cited as costing $36 million or $40 million. The guestrooms were expanded and redecorated, and the top two floors were converted into seven "spa suites" for $4 million. The tower suites had a private butler service. In addition, Equinox Group opened a spa and fitness center at the hotel in 1997, and the hotel's guests were allowed to use the fitness center's gym and pool for free. The Barbizon did not have a full-service restaurant after the renovation, so it launched a partnership with seven nearby restaurants. Schrager re-acquired the Barbizon from Kluge in May 1998, along with the Radisson Empire hotel on the Upper West Side, for $177 million. The hotel had 306 rooms, including 12 suites in its tower section, although rent-controlled tenants still occupied some of these rooms.

==== 2000s ====
Schrager did not intend to own the hotel for the long term, as Kluge had just renovated it. Furthermore, the Barbizon's theming and style did not match that of Schrager's other hotels. By 2000, Schrager had hired Carlton Advisory Services to advise on the hotel's sale. The Berwind Property Group (later BPG Properties) had signed a contract in December 2000 to buy the hotel for $100 million, but negotiations over the sale later stalled. In March 2001, Berwind subsidiary Melrose Hotel Company agreed to buy the Barbizon Hotel from Schrager and North Star Capital Group. The sale was finalized two months later; the purchase price was not publicly disclosed, but it was estimated to have been $69 million or $100 million. Berwind financed the purchase with a $62 million loan from Bear Stearns.

Melrose initially planned to spend $8.5 million on renovations between 2001 and 2006. Following the September 11 attacks, when hotels in New York City saw decreased business, Melrose decided to spend $5 million on renovations within 20 months. Occupancy rates had returned to pre–2001 levels by July 2002. As part of the renovation. Melrose restored the grilles on the windows and the stonework on the facade; the company also enlarged and replaced the windows, and it removed air-conditioning louvers. The Barbizon was rebranded the Melrose Hotel in June 2002. At the time, 15 women still occupied rent-controlled apartments at the hotel. Melrose allegedly enforced a strict English-only policy among staff members; this prompted several Spanish-speaking employees to sue the hotel in 2004, claiming that they had been fired or forced to resign. The lawsuit was settled in early 2006, after the hotel had closed.

=== Conversion to condos ===
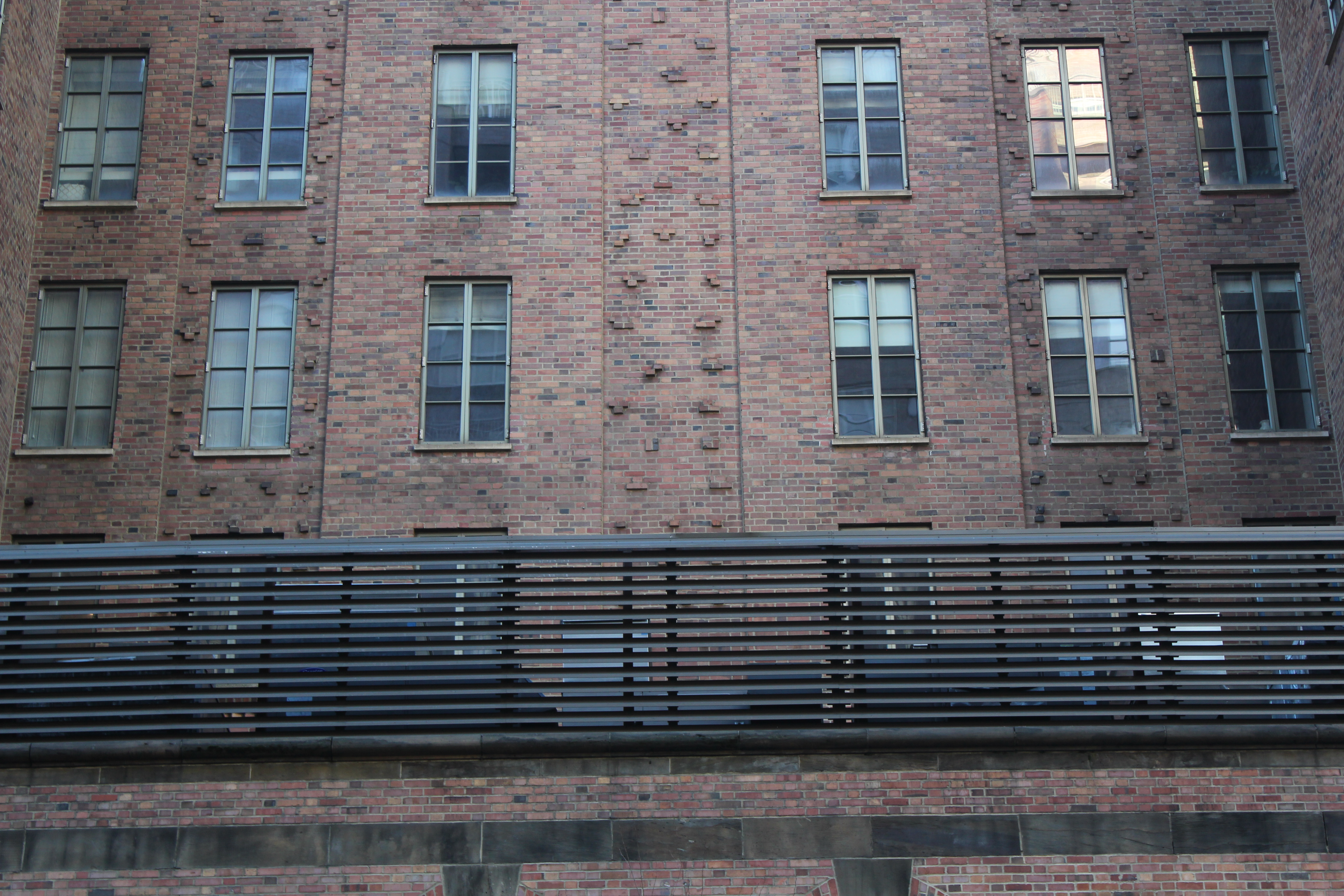
Light court in the center of the facade

BPG Properties closed the hotel in 2005 with plans to convert the building to a condominium development. Nancy Ruddy of architectural firm CetraRuddy oversaw the renovation. When the condos were completed the following year, the building was rebranded as Barbizon/63. According to a member of Berwind's sales and marketing team, the company had considered the Barbizon name "old and stodgy" but had received positive feedback about it; the number 63 was added to give the name "a modern spin". The Barbizon was split into 66 apartments, which ranged from a one-bedroom apartment costing $1 million to a 5,300-square-foot (490 m^{2}), double-story penthouse costing $15 million. Fourteen women, most over the age of 50, remained in rent-controlled apartments, paying $113 to $424 per month. These women were relocated to their own floor.

To promote the condominium complex, the developers of Barbizon/63 launched a marketing campaign featuring past residents of the hotel, such as Monegasque princess Grace Kelly. By 2011, most of the condos had been sold at their listed prices, except for two of the penthouse apartments. Local civic group Friends of the Upper East Side Historic Districts asked the New York City Landmarks Preservation Commission (LPC) to designate the Barbizon as a city landmark. The LPC began considering the building for landmark status in July 2011 and designated the building as a landmark in May 2012.

== Notable tenants ==
=== Female ===
- Edith Bouvier Beale, socialite and cabaret performer
- Ann Beattie, writer
- Barbara Bel Geddes, actress
- Candice Bergen, actress
- Margaret Brown, survivor of the sinking of the Titanic
- Janet Burroway, author
- Peggy Cass, comedian
- Barbara Chase, writer and artist
- Carmen Dell'Orefice, actress and model
- Joan Didion, writer
- Robin Chandler Duke, diplomat
- Farrah Fawcett, actress
- Gael Greene, writer
- Shelley Hack, actress and model
- Dayle Haddon, actress and model
- Elizabeth Hartman, actress
- Dolores Hawkins, singer
- Tippi Hedren, actress
- Diane Johnson, journalist
- Jennifer Jones, actress
- Grace Kelly, actress and later princess of Monaco
- Phyllis Kirk, actress
- Cloris Leachman, actress
- Aline McDermott, actress
- Ali MacGraw, actress and activist
- Dorothy McGuire, actress
- Liza Minnelli, singer and actress
- Peggy Noonan, journalist
- Cathy O'Donnell, actress
- Jean Patchett, model
- Sylvia Plath, writer
- Phylicia Rashad, singer and actress
- Nancy Reagan, actress and later U.S. first lady
- Georgette Mosbacher, cosmetics executive; stayed at the hotel after its mixed-gender conversion
- Margo Sappington, model and dancer
- Kathryn Scola, screenwriter
- Cybill Shepherd, actress and model
- Lynn Sherr, journalist
- Mona Simpson, writer
- Jaclyn Smith, actress
- Elaine Stritch, actress
- Gene Tierney, actress
- Meg Wolitzer, writer

=== Male ===
According to Paulina Bren, for many men, "the Barbizon lobby seemed a perfect place for respite" just as they came to the intersection of Lexington Avenue and 63rd Street. Male visitors included writer J. D. Salinger, who sat in the building's coffee shop while pretending to be a Canadian hockey player, and actor Malachy McCourt, who claimed to have successfully sneaked into the upper stories. Other men attempted to visit the upper stories by bribing employees, sneaking up the fire escapes, or dressing up in medical gear. Men who stayed or lived at the Barbizon after 1981 have included:

- Nicola Bulgari
- David Hershkovits, publisher
- Ricky Gervais, actor and comedian

== Impact ==
Shortly after the hotel was completed, architectural critic Matlack Price wrote: "Though The Barbizon is mainly Gothic in detail, its total effect is of a very Romanesque sort of Gothic. The utilization of large Gothic windows is ingenious as applied to this type of building..." H. I. Brock of The New York Times praised the colors on the building's facade, which ranged "from rose to a greenish shade, with bits of almost black". Architect and writer Robert A. M. Stern wrote in 1987 that the Barbizon was a "romantically massed and detailed, tawny-colored" edifice. The hotel's design may have been inspired by that of the Shelton Hotel in Midtown Manhattan.

A commentator for Newsday wrote in 1978 that "the lobby is positively chic looking, the restaurant good and modestly priced, and both the swimming pool and upstairs library-lounge bonus delights". Another critic wrote in 1986 that the Barbizon's lobby was one of several "cozy and comfortable architectural gems" in New York City's hotels. New York Times food critic Bryan Miller said of the hotel's restaurant in 1986: "This renovated 1920's hotel with its long polished bar and tables facing animated Lexington Avenue is a fine place to unwind with a glass of wine or champagne." Terry Trucco of the Times wrote in 1990 that the Barbizon "retains certain reminders of earlier times", with a mezzanine that resembled a "film palace" and a brasserie that did not serve alcohol. Arthur Kaptainis of the Montreal Gazette wrote that the lobby's "soothing early-Gothic look should lower your blood pressure nicely after a hard afternoon of glitz". In 1993, a writer for The Washington Post wrote that "the Barbizon is perfectly nice if you don't mind rooms the size of matchbooks".

Sylvia Plath's 1963 novel The Bell Jar was set in a fictionalized version of the Barbizon, known as the "Amazon". Paulina Bren characterized the novel as "an almost literal account of [Plath's] life in New York in June 1953", albeit under the alias Esther Greenwood. The hotel hosted a promotional party for the 1979 film The Bell Jar, which was based on Plath's novel. In addition, Bren published a book about the hotel, The Barbizon, in 2021.

== See also ==
- List of New York City Designated Landmarks in Manhattan from 59th to 110th Streets
- National Register of Historic Places listings in Manhattan from 59th to 110th Streets
- List of YWCA buildings
