= Paulina Bren =

American writer and historian

Paulina Bren is an American writer and historian. She teaches at Vassar College as the Adjunct Professor of Multidisciplinary Studies on the Pittsburgh Endowment Chair in the Humanities. Her earlier work focused on postwar Europe, particularly the history of everyday life behind the Iron Curtain. She now writes narrative nonfiction with a focus on women’s history.

== Early life and education ==
Bren was born in Brno, Czechoslovakia. In 1968, the Soviet-Warsaw Pact Army invaded Czechoslovakia, bringing an end to the Prague Spring, and her family managed to leave for the United Kingdom just weeks before the borders closed shut. Growing up in Watford, outside of London, Bren attended the Watford Grammar School for Girls and the Northwood College for Girls.

Her family later moved to the United States, where Bren attended Garden City High School in New York, and then Wesleyan University in Connecticut. She majored in the College of Letters Program, graduating in 1987 with honors, and winning the Horgan Prize for short fiction. She later pursued an M.A. in International and East European Studies, as a Jackson Fellow, at the Jackson School of International Studies at the University of Washington, Seattle, and then a Ph.D. in European History at New York University, as a MacCracken Fellow, studying with the late historian Tony Judt.

She is Adjunct Professor at Vassar College.

== Books ==
Her first book,The Greengrocer and His TV: The Culture of Communism after the 1968 Prague Spring (Cornell University Press, 2010), is a history of everyday life in the two decades after the Soviet invasion. The book cast one of the first lines in what would become a new field of study about late communism, winning the 2012 Council for European Studies Book Prize, the 2012 Austrian Studies Association Book Prize, and short-listed for the 2011 Wayne S. Vucinich Prize. Her next book, Communism Unwrapped: Consumption in Cold War Eastern Europe (Oxford University Press, 2012), is a collection of edited essays with Mary Neuburger of the University of Texas, Austin.

Her first commercial non-fiction book,The Barbizon: The Hotel That Set Women Free, is about the famous women’s hotel on 63rd Street and Lexington Avenue in New York City. It was published in 2021 by Simon & Schuster in the U.S. and by Two Roads/Hachette in the U.K. It has been translated into Spanish, Italian, and Russian, with foreign rights also sold to South Korea, China, and Hungary. Bren weaves the history of the hotel from its opening in the 1920s to its conversion to luxury condominiums in the 2000s to tell the story of its residents, of New York City, and of female ambition in 20th century America. The Barbizon was a New York Times Editor’s Choice, and was reviewed in The New Yorker, the New York Times, the Wall Street Journal, the Washington Post, The Guardian, The Times, and elsewhere.The Barbizon has been optioned for television by Rose Byrne and Lionsgate Studios.

In 2024, she published She-Wolves, a book about women and Wall Street in the 1970s and 1980s. It has been optioned for television by eOne Entertainment.

== Bibliography ==
- The Greengrocer and His TV. Ithaca, [N.Y.]: Cornell University Press. 2010. ISBN 978-0-8014-4767-9. OCLC 475444326.
- The Barbizon: The Hotel That Set Women Free, ISBN 978-1-9821-2390-1
- She-Wolves. 2024-09-17. ISBN 978-1-324-03515-2.
