= The Barbizon (book) =

2021 book by Paulina Bren

The Barbizon: The Hotel That Set Women Free
- Author: Paulina Bren
- Language: English
- Subject: Barbizon Hotel for Women
- Publisher: Simon & Schuster
- Publication date: March 2, 2021
- Pages: 336
- ISBN: 978-1-982123-89-5

The Barbizon: The Hotel That Set Women Free is a 2021 book by Paulina Bren that examines the Barbizon Hotel for Women on the Upper East Side of Manhattan, New York City.

The book describes the hotel as an opportunity for single women to come to the big city, to facilitate their dreams of a career, while staying in a "protected" space, with a staff that looked out for their interests and prevented men from entering their rooms.

== Critical reception ==
The book was reviewed by Kirkus Reviews, Publishers Weekly, Booklist, Library Journal, the New York Times, and the Wall Street Journal.
