= Allerton Hotel for Women =

Hotel in Manhattan, New York

Coordinates: 40°45′39.04″N 73°58′9.89″W

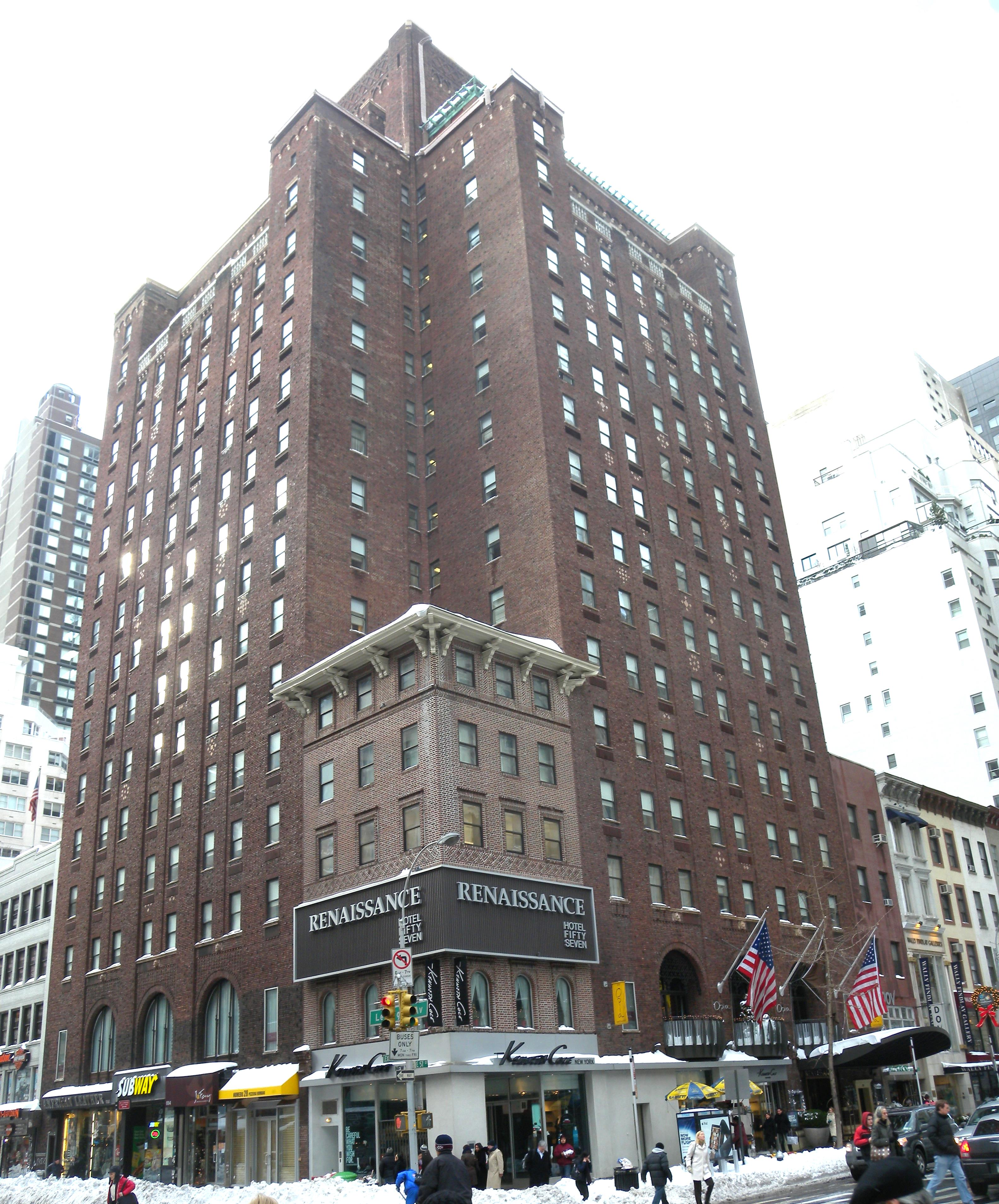
Hotel 57

The Allerton Hotel for Women, today known as Hotel 57, is a hotel located at 130 East 57th Street in the New York City borough of Manhattan. It is a seventeen-story brick, limestone, and terra cotta building designed by Arthur Loomis Harmon in 1920. It was built on the southwest corner of Lexington Avenue and 57th Street by the Allerton House Company at a cost of $700,000. It originally had stores on its ground floor. The hotel intended to accommodate six hundred business and professional women and also shelter young girls. When completed in 1923, the Allerton Hotel had room for four hundred tenants. Its occupancy was filled prior to completion and there was a long waiting list. After opening it was so popular that another establishment of its kind was anticipated.

== Ownership ==
James Stewart Cushman was a founder and former owner of the Allerton chain of reasonably priced club hotels for white collar men and women which started in 1916. The group of financiers who joined Allerton included George W. Perkins and Arthur Curtiss James. The chain was named for Mary Allerton, a Mayflower ancestor of Cushman.

Cushman was injured critically in a car wreck in September 1934, when he collided with a truck on the Berlin Turnpike in Newington, Connecticut. He was taken to Hartford Hospital and found to have fractured his skull. Cushman was chosen by the Presbyterian Board Of Christian Education as chairman of a special gifts committee of the New York division of the Sesquicentennial Fund for Christian Education, in January 1939. Cushman resided at 815 Fifth Avenue (Manhattan). He died at eighty years of age in March 1952.

== Expansion ==
The Allerton Hotel in Chicago, Illinois, which opened in 1924, was owned and operated by the Allerton Company of New York. They managed a hotel chain that grew to eight hotels. This included establishments in Detroit, Michigan and Cleveland, Ohio. The owners of the Allerton Hotel purchased the property formerly occupied by the De La Salle Institute in December 1923. The land was located at 106 West 59th Street through to 58th Street. Its dimensions were 53.6 by 200 feet. They also bought the adjoining Kinlock Apartments at the northwest corner of Sixth Avenue and 58th Street, 71 by 100 feet. They acquired the Temple Rodeph Sholom site at the corner of Lexington Avenue and 63rd Street from Simon Brothers and Hartstein Brothers in October 1926. At the time William H. Silk was secretary of the Allerton Hotel interests. The plot measured 112 feet on Lexington Avenue and 120 feet on 63rd Street.

The owners built a new hotel at Lexington Avenue and 63rd Street. The fourth store to lease space in the new edifice was Sheldon Cleaners and Dyers in March 1927. The lease for a term of years was negotiated by Gaines, Van Nostrand & Morrison, Inc.

In September 1942, the Allerton Hotels leased the eight-story Club Hotel at 317 West 45th Street from Vincent Astor. The building contained one hundred sixty-five sleeping rooms, reception room, lounge, library, and dining room. The Club Hotel enabled the hotel chain to provide low cost accommodations in the Midtown Manhattan section of the West Side. Broker Abraham Steers negotiated the lease.

There were six Allerton Hotels in New York City. The Allerton Hotel became part of a new chain of hotels that included six cities in October 1958. The new Mansion Hotels chain also included the Henry Hudson Hotel and Midston House in New York City. The Detroit-Leland Hotel and the Allerton Hotel and Belmont Hotel in Chicago, were the others in the group. They had a total of 4,600 rooms.

The hotel was renamed Renaissance New York Hotel 57 in 2009.

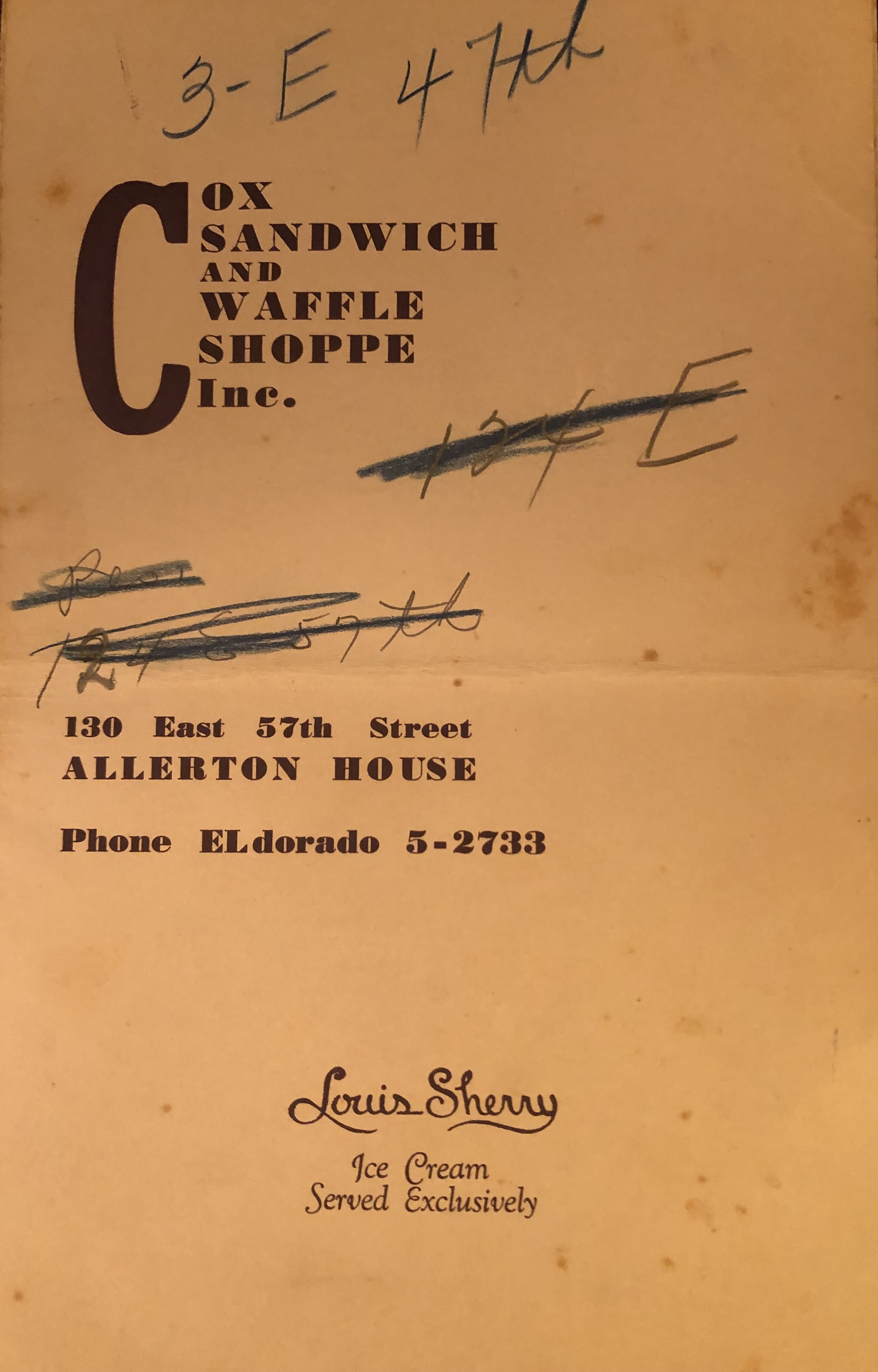

== Hotel addenda ==
The Cox Sandwich & Waffle Shoppe Inc. was one of the many businesses operating in the hotel Circa 1930s. The proprietor, William Lea Cox, was born in Louisiana on July 3, 1891. He moved to New York after 1910. He married Caroline “Carrie” Unkel in 1913. He died June 21, 1939.

Helen Whiley, a music teacher and graduate of Vassar College, tried to jump off the roof of the Allerton Hotel in May 1929. She was prevented by the quick effort of a policeman. Whiley, 26, lived at the Allerton before moving to an apartment house at 238 West 11th Street. Friends said she had been ill with influenza. She was seen by friends as she climbed to the Allerton clubroom on the penthouse floor of the roof. She talked with several of them before she walked through to the roof. No one saw her when she climbed the narrow parapet which encircled the roof. After being rescued she was sent to Bellevue Hospital Center for observation.

The Women's University Club made the Allerton Hotel its headquarters beginning in May 1956. Their former headquarters was the New York Biltmore Hotel.

The Allerton Hotel at 302 West 22nd Street, New York City, was described as a welfare hotel in a 1990 article. A crying newborn baby was found in a garbage can there by a porter. The baby girl was taken to St. Vincent's Hospital and was reported to be in stable condition. Police thought the infant belonged to one of eighteen pregnant women then residing at the hotel. The facility is now an upscale The GEM Hotel.

Contrary to popular belief in Chicago, the Chicago hotel was never built nor owned by Robert Allerton, son of Samuel Allerton. Mr. Cushman asked Robert Allerton if he minded having the hotel named "Allerton" rather than "Cushman." Mr. Allerton had no problem with it.
