= National Collaborative for Women's History Sites =

The National Collaborative for Women's History Sites (NCWHS) is a nonprofit US membership organization that aims to promote the preservation and interpretation of women's history through museums and historic sites. The NCWHS mission is to help ensure "the preservation and interpretation of sites and locales that bear witness to women's participation in American life and to make women's contributions to history visible so that all women's experience and potential are fully valued." The organization produces publications (Revealing Women's History: Best Practices at Historic Sites, and Women's History: Sites and Resources); hosts workshops and webinars; offers panels at professional conferences, encourages the development of heritage trails; and creates and shares resources aimed to help public historians better incorporate women's history into historic sites. These programs are often developed in partnership with other history organizations, including the National Park Service, the National Women’s History Project, the Organization of American Historians and other preservation agencies and history membership organizations as well as a range of historic sites to expand and support the venues and ways in which women's history is shared with public audiences.

The NCWHS was created in October 2001 by representatives of more than twenty historical sites linked to American women and some twenty others from organizations devoted to preserving women's history; noting that only about 4% of the nation's historic sites interpreted topics in women's history, the founding members aimed to support the efforts of small local groups working to expand the presence of women's history in their own communities by helping form networks and by serving as a clearinghouse for information and resources. Today the membership includes curators, interpreters, managers, history consultants, faculty members, students and a range of other history professionals as well as museums and historic sites and members of the general public. The organization is governed by a board of directors, chaired by Heather Huyck. The NCWHS is headquartered at the Evanston History Center in Evanston, Illinois.

The National Votes for Women Trail is one project that the NCWHS is undertaking. The goal is to tell the untold story of suffrage for all women. For this effort, they are partnering with The William G. Pomeroy Foundation.

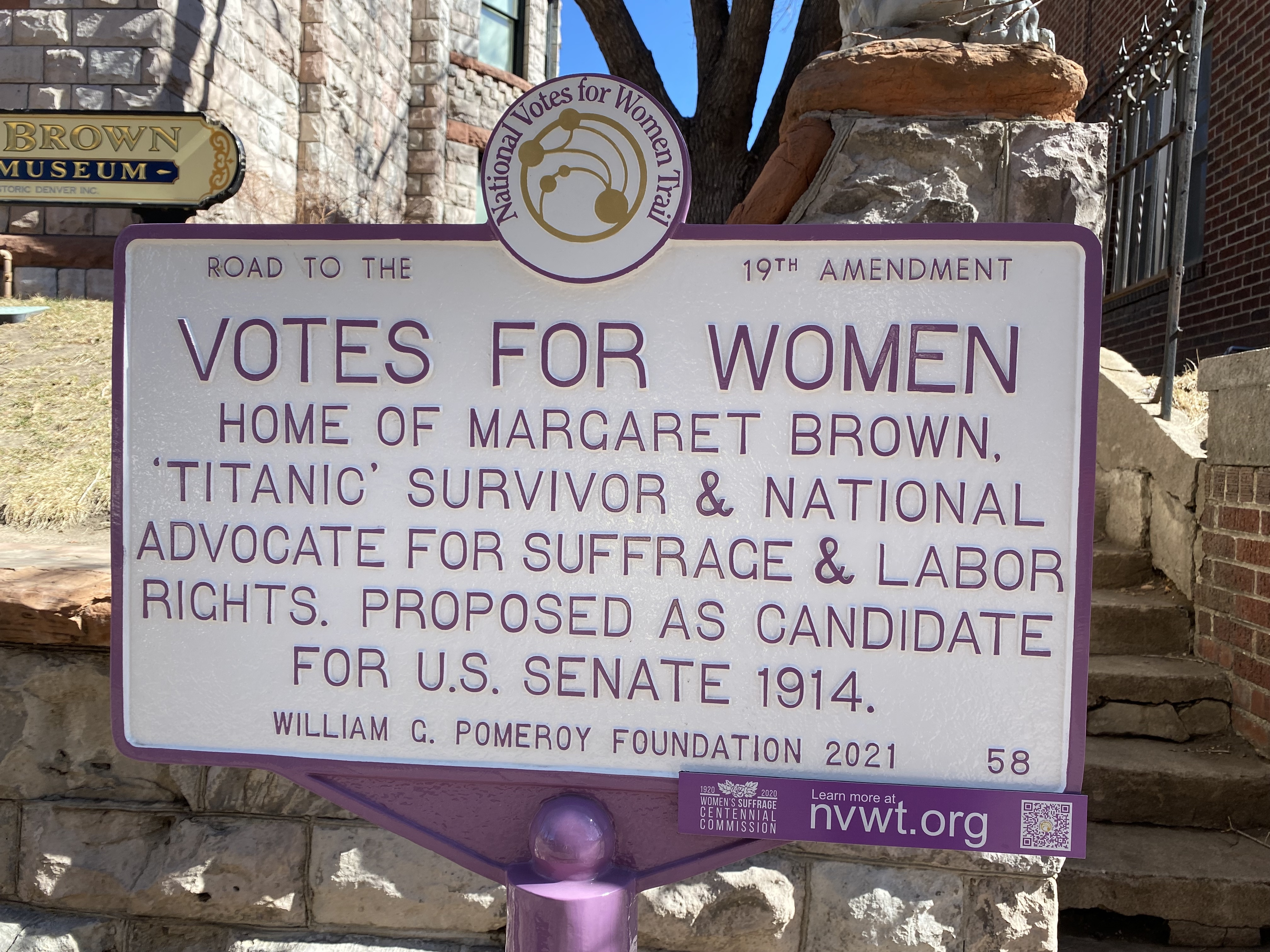
One such sign. Votes for Women Suffrage Sign outside The Molly Brown House Museum in Denver, CO. Taken March 2023.
