= The GEM Hotel =

Hotels in Manhattan, New York

Coordinates: 40.74473°N 73.99946°W

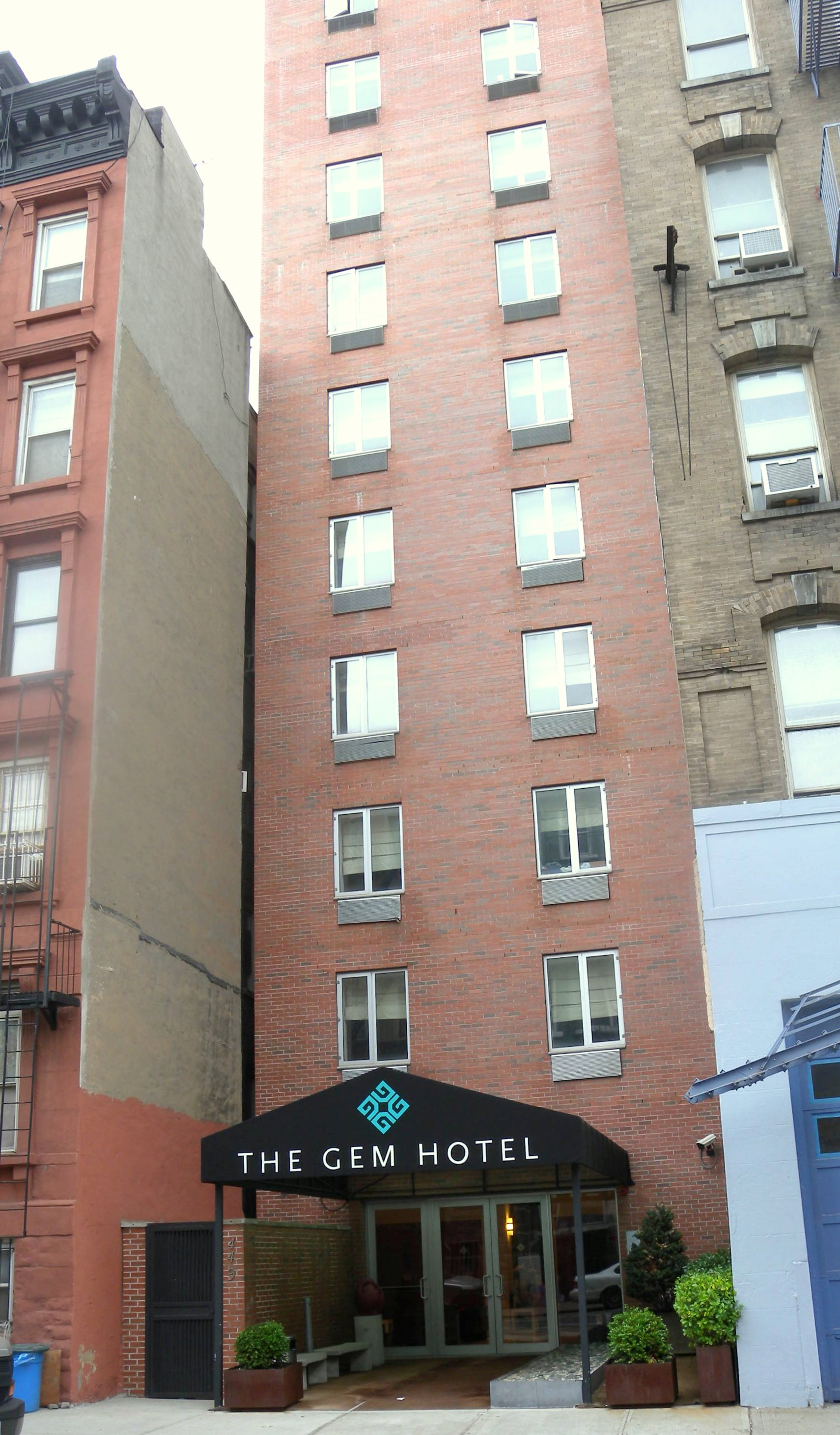
West 36th St

The GEM Hotel brand is a neighborhood boutique hotel collection in Manhattan, New York City. The brand, which was launched in 2007, currently has three locations: The GEM Hotel Midtown West, The GEM Hotel SoHo and The GEM Hotel Chelsea, which was voted Best New York City Boutique Hotel in 2010 by Citysearch. A fourth location, The GEM Hotel Union Square, is under construction.

Owned and operated by Gemini Real Estate Advisors, LLC, The GEM Hotel is an independent hotel collection. Reservation support is provided by the Ascend Collection by Choice Hotels through a membership affiliation. Gemini Real Estate Advisors is a full-service real estate company that specializes in the acquisition, development and management of commercial real estate.

== Location ==
- The 81-room GEM Hotel Chelsea is located at 300 West 22nd Street, off of Eighth Avenue, in the Chelsea neighborhood of Manhattan. It is accessible via the New York City Subway, on the A, C, and E trains at 23rd Street.
- The 39-room GEM Hotel Midtown West is located at 449 West 36th St. between Ninth and Tenth Avenues in Midtown Manhattan, near Penn Station, Port Authority and the Jacob K. Javits Convention Center.
- The 45-room GEM Hotel Soho, at 135 East Houston Street borders the SoHo and Lower East Side neighborhoods of Manhattan.
