= Emin Kadi =

American-Albanian photographer, journalist, art director and magazine publisher

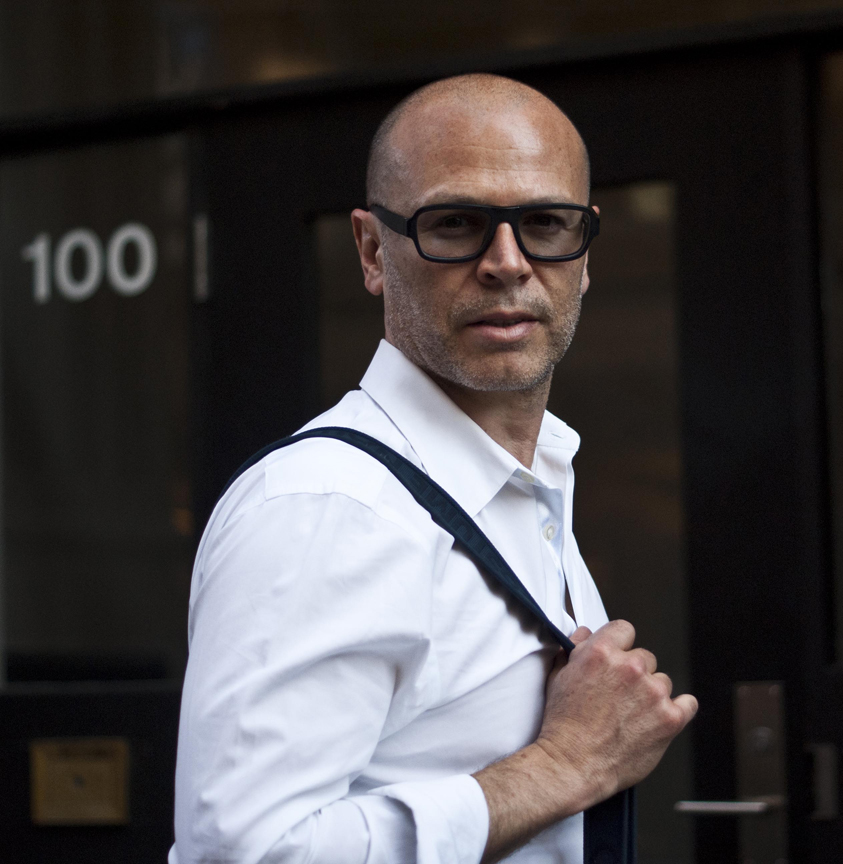

Emin Kadi is an Albanian-American fashion photographer, journalist, art director and magazine publisher. Born in Detroit (first-generation American of Albanian descent), he studied architecture and later became a fashion model. Kadi later became a self-taught fashion photographer. He is the founder, creative director, contributing photographer and publisher of Clear Magazine. He also started an image branding and app development company called Dfiant Media. He owns and rents several properties throughout the metro-Detroit area.

== Photography ==
In 1990 Kadi decided to pursue fashion photography, as a result of being influenced by fashion through his previous modeling career. His work can be seen in both fashion magazines and campaigns including being published in Italian Vogue, Prim, WestEast magazine, PDN, Dwell, Picture, and is currently a regular contributor to Clear. He has worked with top models in the fashion industry such as Miranda Kerr, Candice Swanepool, May Andersen, Madeleine Blomberg, Tori Praver, Anna Claudia, Tiiu Kuik, Elyse Taylor, J.P, Nik, Eugenia, Juliana Martins, Yasmin Brunet and Ajuma Nasenyana.

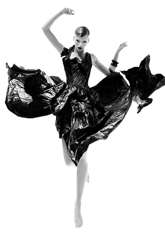
Madeleine Blomberg

== Clear Magazine ==
Kadi founded Clear Magazine in 2001 as an international magazine focusing on fashion, design, art and luxury. Since inception the magazine has published 34 printed issues and two purely digital issues for iPad. Adobe Systems Inc. has used these interactive digital issues as an ultimate sample. In 2011, Adobe used the first digital issue for the launch of their CreativeSuite version 5.5 campaign.

== Art direction/creative projects ==
As acting creative director, Kadi has collaborated on various works published in Clear magazine with artists that include, Philippe Starck, Stuart Haygarth, Dennis Hopper, James Turrell, Andrée Putman, Marcel Duchamp, Takashi Murakami, Frank Gehry, Zaha Hadid, Ross Lovegrove, Ron Arad, Karim Rashid, Yves Béhar, Arne Quinze, the Campana brothers and Marcel Wanders. Special projects include visual treatments for the Warner Brothers Network, art direction, photography and custom publishing of 4c Magazine for AkzoNobel, and MagneCote.

== Journalism ==
Emin Kadi’s published interviews include Dennis Hopper, Takashi Murikami, Ron Arad, Tokujin Yoshioka, Kevin Huang, Jason Schwartzman, Victor Müller, Shiro Nakamura, Todd Bracher, Dror Benshetrit and Nicolas Roldan.

== Awards ==
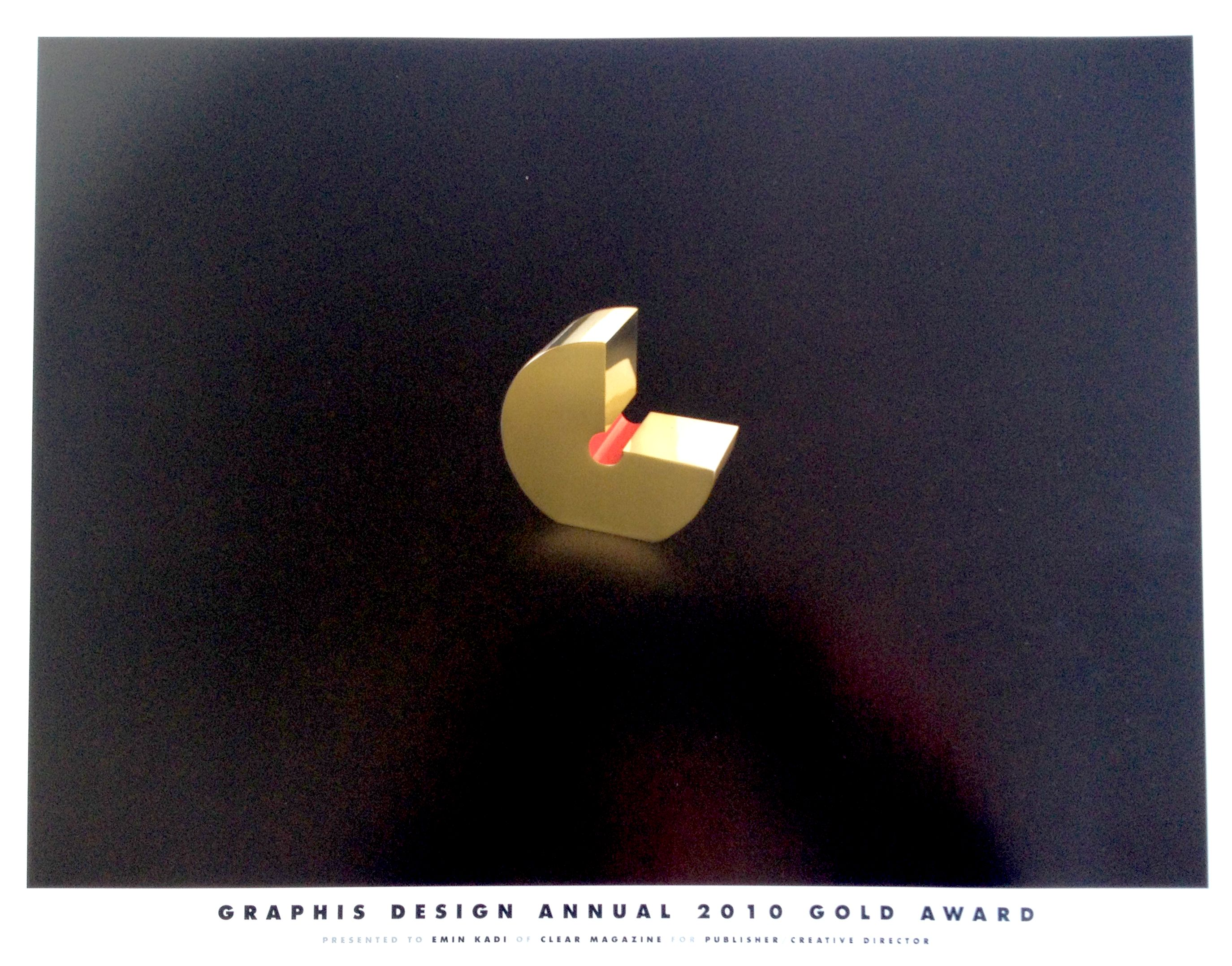
Graphis Design Annual 2010 Gold Award

- Graphis Design Annual 2010 Gold Award
