= Coppens =

Coppens or Coppen is a Dutch patronymic surname primarily found in East Flanders. It may refer to:

- Amaya Coppens (born 1994), Nicaraguan student activist
- An Coppens (born 1971), Belgian gamification expert
- Astrid Coppens (born 1983), Belgian model and actress
- Augustin Coppens (1668–1740), Flemish painter and engraver
- Claude Coppens (born 1936), Belgian pianist and composer
- Christophe Coppens (born 1969), Belgian fashion designer and artist
- Els Coppens-van de Rijt (born 1943), Dutch artist and author
- Henri Coppens (1930–2015), Belgian footballer
- Jo Coppens (born 1990), Belgian footballer
- Matt Coppens (born 1971), American ice sledge hockey player
- Omer Coppens, Belgian painter and ceramic artist
- Paul Coppens, French racing cyclist
- Philip Coppens (chemist) (1930–2017), Dutch chemist and crystallographer
- Philip Coppens (author) (1971–2012), Belgian author and radio host
- Thierry Coppens (born 1979), Belgian footballer
- Willy Coppens (1892–1986), Belgium's leading fighter ace of World War I
- Yves Coppens (1934–2022), French anthropologist

== See also ==
- Coppen (disambiguation)
- 172850 Coppens, an asteroid named after Yves Coppens
