= Clear (magazine) =

American magazine

- Categories: fashion/design
- Frequency: quarterly
- Publisher: Clear Publications LLC
- Founded: 2002
- Country: United States
- Language: English
- Website: clearmag.com

Clear is a fashion, art and luxury and design magazine founded in 2001 by Emin Kadi, also a contributing photographer.

Clear has offices in Royal Oak, Michigan, and New York City, New York.

In December 2008, the magazine published its first tree-less, 100% recyclable issue, printed on YUPO synthetic papers, during Design Miami/Art Basel festival at the Miami Design District, where Clear is a media partner.

Clear was 100% digital. In January 2011, it launched a 10-year anniversary application for the iPad, available globally on iTunes. This digital issue, "The Best of Clear Vol. 1" marks the 10-year anniversary of Clear. It is a compilation of the most impressive photos and features from Clear's previous years in print. This issue fills 250+ digital application pages with features such as 360 degree viewer, videos, tap-and-buy for clothing and accessories, pinch enlarge and slide shows.

In April 2011, Clear became the face of Adobe Systems Incorporated's CreativeSuite version 5.5, specifically the new Digital Publishing Suite.

"Taking Clear digital was one of the most exciting things we've done. We wanted a presence on tablet devices and Adobe Creative Suite software and Adobe Digital Publishing Suite paved the way", said Kadi. "Now, with full support for iOS 5 Newsstand subscriptions, we will be able to further monetize our digital editions and make our content more discoverable".

== Content ==
The print and online content of Clear has shown people in design, art, architecture and fashion: Takashi Murakami, Philippe Starck, Ross Lovegrove, Arne Quinze, Marcel Wanders, Karim Rashid, Jean Nouvel, Stefan Sagmeister and others.

Clear has had profiles of and interviews with people including Takashi Murakami, Philippe Starck, Dolce & Gabbana, Jean Nouvel, Ross Lovegrove, Zaha Hadid, Oscar Niemeyer, Sonia Rykiel, Massimo and Leila Vignelli, Karim Rashid, Marcel Wanders, Martin Margiela, David Lynch, Dennis Hopper, Wendell Castle, Shiro Kuramata, Dror Benshetrit, Ron Arad, Alexander Wang, Christophe Coppens, Stephen Jones and Kenji Yanobe.

== Awards ==
Sophisticated Sense, Issue 32

Clear has won multiple design awards, including:

- Wally Award 2003.
- The Great Design Show Award
- Print Design Awards (2006)
- Applied Arts (2005/2006)
- Ozzie Award (2003)
- M-real (2005)
- Gold Ink Awards (2004, 2005, 2009)
- Graphis Award 2010

== Nominations ==
- Lucie Award.
