= Soho Synagogue =

Former Orthodox synagogue in Manhattan, New York

SoHo Synagogue
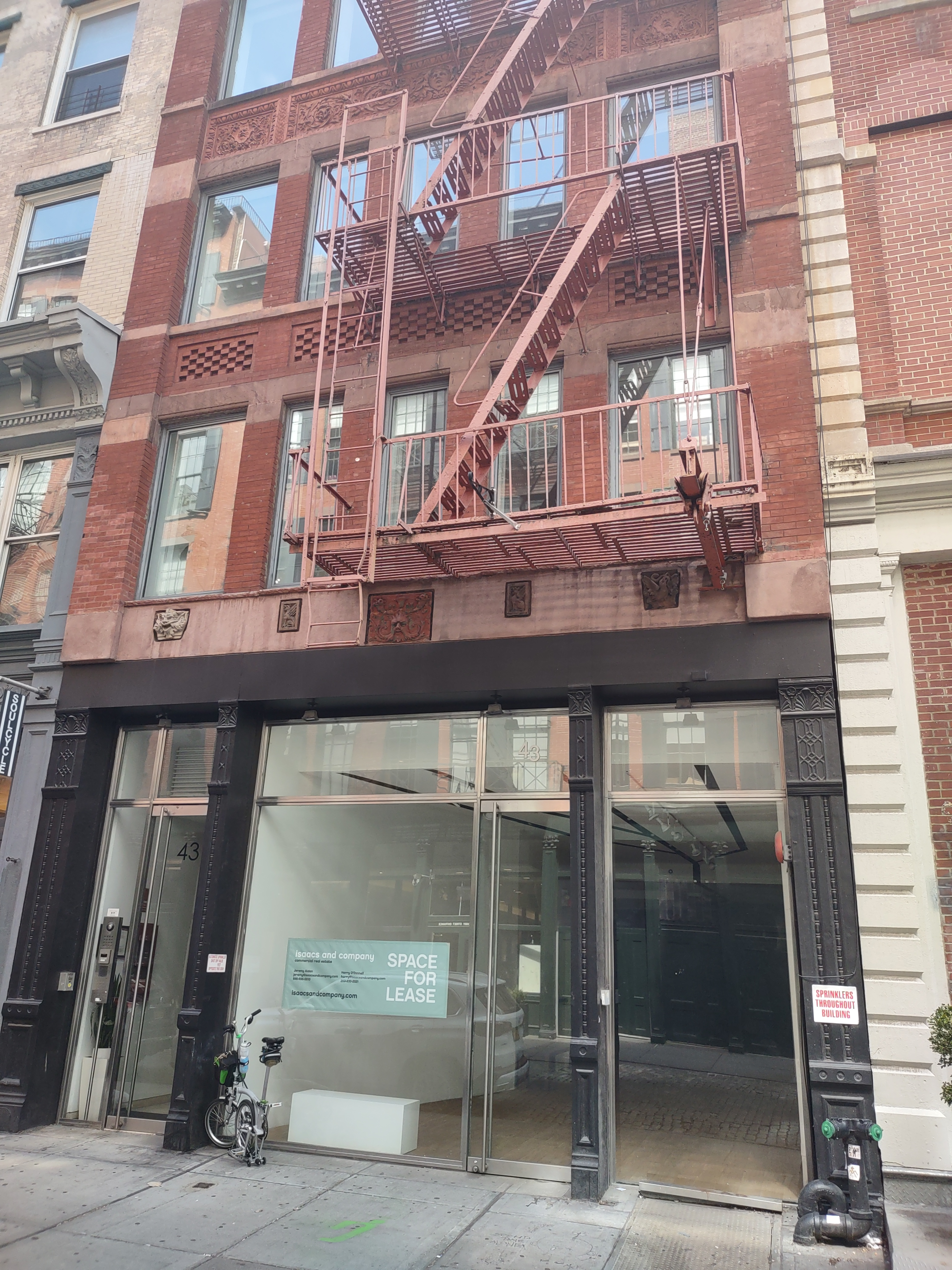

- Location of the former synagogue in Lower Manhattan

Religion
- Affiliation: Orthodox Judaism (former)
- Ecclesiastical or organizational status: Synagogue (2005–c. 2015)
- Status: Closed

Location
- Location: 43 Crosby Street, SoHo, Manhattan, New York City, New York
- Country: United States
- Interactive map of SoHo Synagogue
- Coordinates: 40°43′18″N 73°59′55″W

Architecture
- Architect: Dror Benshetrit
- Founder: Rabbi Dovi Scheiner; Esty Scheiner
- Funded by: Katrin and Tony Sosnick
- Established: 2005 (as a congregation)
- Completed: 2011

Soho Synagogue was an Orthodox Jewish congregation and synagogue located at 43 Crosby Street, in the SoHo neighborhood of Manhattan, New York City, New York, United States.

The congregation was founded in 2005 by Chabad-Lubavitch Rabbi Dovi Scheiner and his wife Esty.

On September 15, 2009, the SoHo Synagogue signed a 7-year lease for the ground floor of 43 Crosby Street, located between Spring and Broome Streets. Previously a Gucci retail outlet, designer Dror Benshetrit transformed the space into an oppulant synagogue to cater for the growing "hipster" Jewish community.

By 2015, the congregation, which did not charge a membership fee, was losing money. An online spin off of the physical synagogue, called Synago, was established in 2015, yet ultimately failed. In late 2015, Scheiner was trying to establish a similar synagogue in Los Angeles.
