= Poop emoji =

Emoji representing a pile of feces

💩o

Pile of Poo
- Other names: poop emoji, poo emoji
- In Unicode: U+1F4A9 💩 PILE OF POO

The emoji as it appears in Twemoji (left), Noto Emoji (center), and Fluent Emoji (right). Twemoji is used on X, Discord, Roblox and the Nintendo Switch. Noto Emoji is used by various Google apps, and Fluent Emoji is used on Windows.

Pile of Poo (U+1F4A9 💩 PILE OF POO), also known as the poop emoji or poo emoji, is an emoji resembling a coiled pile of feces, which is usually depicted with cartoon eyes and a large smile. The emoji is used to convey humor and disapproval in the West and good luck in Japan.

The poop emoji originated in Japan, where feces had become associated with humor after an anthropomorphized poop featured in Dr. Slump, a popular manga. Created in 1997 by Shigetaka Kurita for phones sold by J-Phone, the emoji became associated with luck when a golden poo good luck charm named Kin no Unko was invented. Google created a version in 2007 in an effort to expand their Asian market, becoming popular outside Asia thereafter. After an influential redesign by Apple, it became increasingly depicted as cute. A poop emoji was added to Unicode in Unicode 6.0 in 2010 and to Unicode's official emoji documentation in 2015.

Outside of texting, the emoji has been depicted in several contexts, including merchandise, as décor, and as a character in the 2017 animated film The Emoji Movie. As of 2021, the poop emoji was among the top 100 most used emojis, an increase since 2019.

Multiple reasons have been put forth to explain the poop emoji's popularity. Several explanations emphasize the contrast of the disgust and happiness it evokes. Other explanations include a popular fascination with the design's swirl, beliefs that the emoji is charming, being a way people can engage with the act of defecation, and for the way its use comments on the nature of modern media consumption.

== History ==
=== Origin ===
The 1997 poop emoji

The poop emoji originated in Japanese digital communication. Feces had first taken on humorous connotations in broader Japanese popular culture in the early 1980s, after an anthropomorphized poop famously appeared in the manga Dr. Slump. These connotations were furthered when the character appeared in the internationally successful series Dragon Ball, prompting the creation of an array of merchandise depicting the poop.

An early design of the modern poop emoji was seen in 1982, among the Sharp MZ-80K computer's internal set of typeable symbols. In 1997, the first popular emoji set appeared on phones sold by J-Phone. It was created by Shigetaka Kurita, an employee of the Japanese telecom company NTT DoCoMo. The poop emoji was black-and-white, with a smile, and steam lines for comic effect. Other Japanese telecom companies had their own versions of the emoji, some with more grotesque designs.

When a company in Kyoto began selling golden poop-shaped good luck charms at the turn of the century, poop began being considered lucky in Japan. These products, named Kin no Unko (literally "golden poo"), were a pun based on the word for poo sounding like the word for luck. The subject was considered a popular, humorous, positive object for children, without Western stigmas attached.

=== Outside Japan ===
In 2007, Google, looking to expand its presence in Japan and Asia as a whole, created their first emojis for Gmail, which included a poop emoji. Though it was initially met with internal resistance, the poop emoji was added following usage data; a direct appeal to the manager of Gmail by Google's Japanese product manager convinced the team of the emoji's importance and popularity in Japanese internet culture. Gmail's poop emoji was designed by Google Doodle artists who sought to put a "Google spin" on the emoji. They drew inspiration from existing emoji designs as well as the character Poop-Boy from the Dr. Slump manga, and constrained themselves to 15×15 pixels and the colors used in the Google logo. Their final design was faceless, and included animated flies circling above.

A poop emoji was added to Unicode 6.0 in 2010 and included in Unicode's official emoji documentation in 2015. In 2017, a proposal to add a "frowning pile of poo" emoji to Unicode failed after some typographers in the Unicode Consortium argued it was inappropriate. As an alternative, it was proposed the emoji become an emoji sequence, which would allow it to gain expressions by combining it with other emojis.

Every emoji is rendered differently by Apple, Android and other platforms. Apple's representation of a cute poop emoji was influential, leading to today's poop emoji typically resembling a coiled pile of feces adorned with cartoon eyes and a large smile. As of 2014, Android's poop emoji was surrounded by insects and wavy lines to imply a foul odor. Apple and Twitter's poop emojis grinned and had large eyes, with Twitter's emoji featuring a startled expression. Google's poop emoji gained a smiling face the following December.

== Uses ==
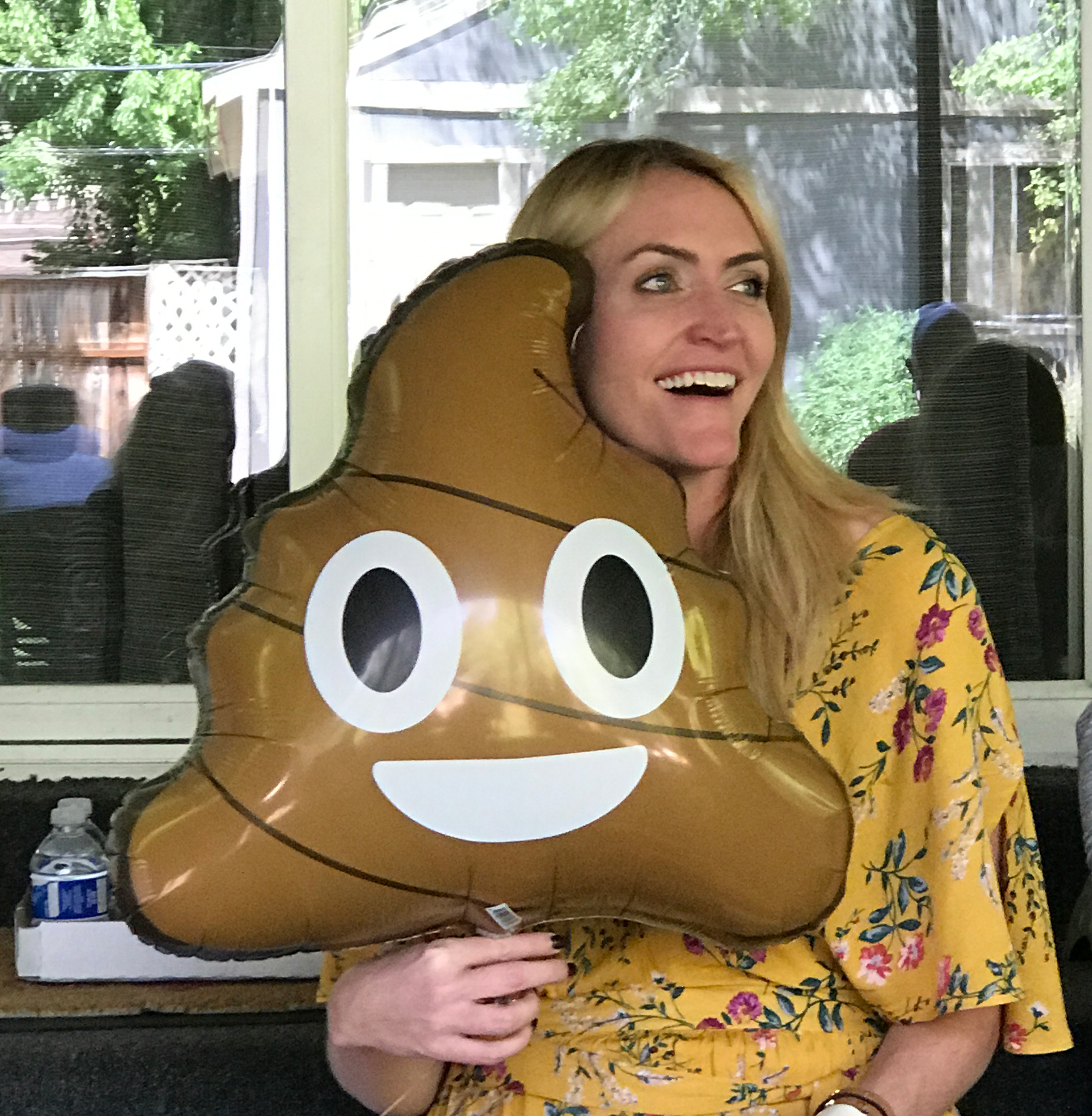
A poop emoji balloon

The poop emoji is commonly used for humor, as an alternative to slang terms and to mock or criticize. Although some of these usages are contradictory, its meaning is less ambiguous than other emojis. In Japan, the poop emoji is often sent to wish the recipient good luck, and is not used to criticize as is commonly done in western countries.

The poop emoji has also been used extensively outside of texting. Such uses include depictions in jewellery, baked goods and rafts, decorating a poop-themed café, in application software such as a digital avatar, and a customizable item in WaterAid's app component of its global sanitation awareness campaign. The poop emoji also appears as a character named "Poop Daddy", voiced by Patrick Stewart, in the 2017 animated comedy film The Emoji Movie.

=== Analysis ===
Some analyses have looked at attitudes towards and the popularity of the poop emoji: A 2014 data scrape of the emojis used in tweets to that date for instance saw the emoji had been posted 7 million times, making it the 88th most common emoji. A 2015 report found it was most popular in Canada among users of a proprietary keyboard application, and a 2022 survey undertaken by Adobe indicated the emoji was the least liked of that year in the US, a perspective observed across generations. In 2021, Unicode released data on the most frequently used emojis of the year. Of the 1549 ranked, the poop emoji was the 98th most frequently used, having moved up from 227th in 2019.

During the 2016 US presidential election, the emoji gained popularity; in this context, linguist Pauline Bryant said it allowed adults to express views on social media that would otherwise be censored. That year, ABC News's Samantha Selinger-Morris said many people believed the emoji had an "ineffable charm" and explained its use as originating in an "ability to transcend language barriers and political differences". Several analyses have identified the emoji's appeal as deriving from a contradiction between the disgust and happiness it evokes. Conversely, Willa Paskin writing for Slate described the connection to literal feces as "tenuous", and only relevant insofar as it makes the emoji more intriguing. Comparative literature professor Jonathan E. Abel credits some of the interest in the emoji to a cross-cultural fascination with the image's swirl.

Despite writing that the shape contributes to its popularity, Abel finds this insufficient to explain the universality of the poop emoji's popularity. Instead, he proposes that people use the emoji as a way to engage with the taboo topic of defecation, evidencing this with the fact that toilets are frequently where phones are used. Abel takes this fact as an opportunity to engage in social commentary. First, he states because phones are frequently used on toilets, some evidence suggests that they are often contaminated with fecal matter and harmful bacteria, permitting "poo on phones" to have a dual meaning of physical feces and the poop emoji. From this, he suggests that the poop emoji may be popular as it signifies media being consumed (phone use on the toilet) at the same time as it signifies the harms of its consumption (seen through the fecal contamination resultant from phone use).

== Encoding ==
Character information
| Preview | 💩 | |
|---|---|---|
| Unicode name | PILE OF POO | |
| Encodings | decimal | hex |
| Unicode | 128169 | U+1F4A9 |
| UTF-8 | 240 159 146 169 | F0 9F 92 A9 |
| UTF-16 | 55357 56489 | D83D DCA9 |
| GB 18030 | 148 57 218 51 | 94 39 DA 33 |
| Numeric character reference | &#128169; | &#x1F4A9; |
| Shift JIS (au by KDDI) | 246 206 | F6 CE |
| Shift JIS (SoftBank 3G) | 249 155 | F9 9B |
| 7-bit JIS (au by KDDI) | 118 80 | 76 50 |
| Emoji shortcode | :poop: | |
| Google name (pre-Unicode) | POOP | |
| CLDR text-to-speech name | pile of poo | |
| Google substitute string | [ウンチ] | |

== See also ==
- Skull emoji
- Wilted rose emoji
