= Asahi Beer Hall =

Building in Sumida-ku, Tokyo, Japan

Coordinates: 35.7098°N 139.80037°E

The Asahi Beer Hall is one of the buildings of the Asahi Breweries headquarters located on the east bank of the Sumida River in Sumida, Tokyo, Japan.

It was designed by French designer Philippe Starck and was completed in 1989. It is considered one of Tokyo's most recognizable modern structures.

The shape of the building is that of a beer glass, designed to complement the neighboring golden beer mug-shaped building housing the Asahi Breweries offices.

== The Asahi Flame (Flamme d'Or) ==
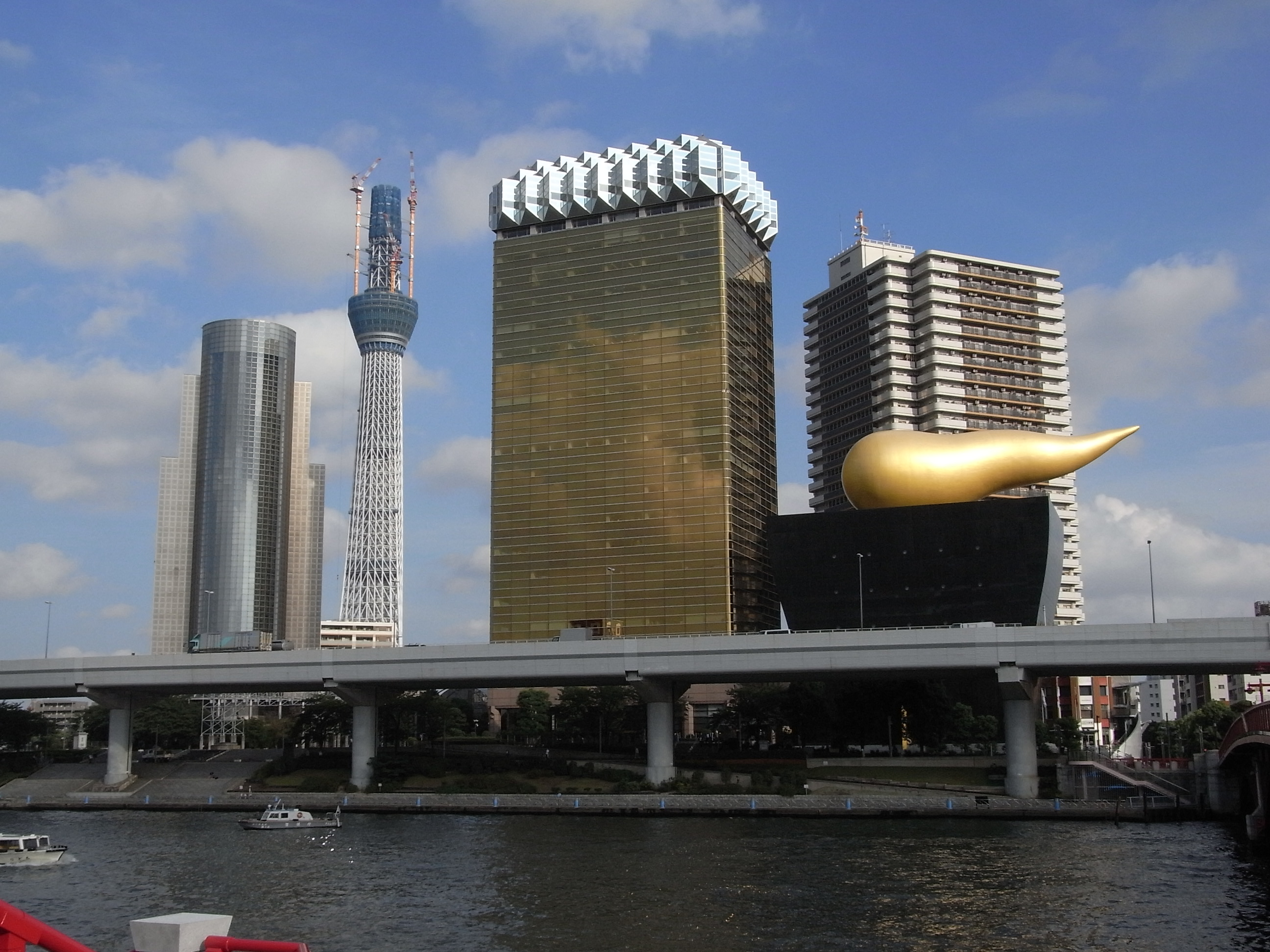
Asahi Breweries headquarters building with the "Asahi Flame" by Philippe Starck (2010)

It is noted for the Asahi Flame, an enormous golden structure at the top, said to represent both the 'burning heart of Asahi beer' and a frothy head. The 360-tonne golden flame was made by shipbuilders using submarine construction techniques. It is empty.

The Asahi Flame is sometimes colloquially referred to as "the golden turd" (kin no unko, 金のうんこ) and the Asahi Beer Hall itself as "poo building" (unko-biru, うんこビル).
