= Coppen =

Coppen or Coppens is a Dutch patronymic surname primarily found in East Flanders. surname:

- Alec Coppen (1923–2019), British psychiatrist
- Charles Coppen, a sports editor for the Providence Journal
- Jennifer Coppen (born 2001), Indonesian actress
- Shirley Coppen (born 1946), Canadian politician

== See also ==
- Coppens (disambiguation)
- Koppen (disambiguation)
