= Kin no unko =

Japanese cultural phenomenon

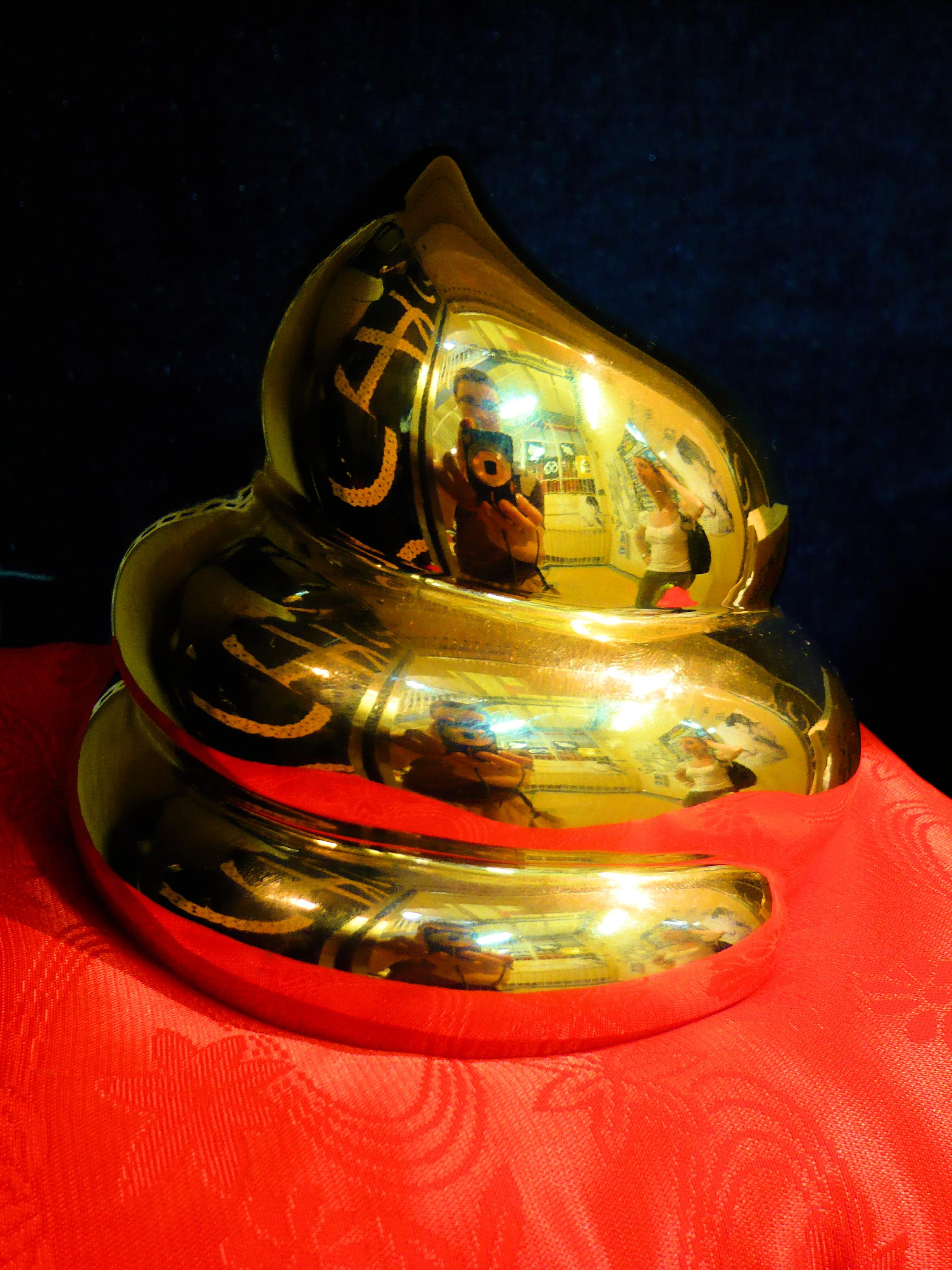
Kin no unko resting on a red backdrop

Kin no unko (金のうんこ) or "golden poo" is a Japanese cultural phenomenon. It is a symbol of good luck, as the name is a pun meaning "golden poo" and "good luck" in Japanese. By 2006, 2.7 million mobile phone charms in this form had been sold. The symbol, or something similar to it called unchi, appears as an emoji available on many mobile devices that support a Unicode expansion made in the summer of 2014. The charm is unusual outside of Japan but was available from the English-language website ThinkGeek.

The flame ornament atop the Asahi Beer Hall in Tokyo is called Kin no unko for its similarity.

== In popular culture ==
- The video games The Legend of Zelda: Breath of the Wild (2017) and The Legend of Zelda: Tears of the Kingdom (2023) contain an item known as Hestu's Gift, which resembles a Kin no unko. It is obtained by collecting all of the game's hidden Korok Seeds, which are implied to be Korok droppings. The item description for Hestu's Gift also makes note of its foul odor.
- Several skits of the golden poo appear in the animated American Dad series.
- The video game Cult of the Lamb released an update in which followers of your cult can create "golden poop" which provides money.
- Kin no unko has been featured heavily in the WarioWare series, often as the "reward" after finishing a microgame.
- The Tamagotchi franchise features several characters based on Kin no unko such as Lucky Unchi-kun from the Tamagotchi Angel (1997) virtual pet, a secret character that is notoriously difficult to raise and considered a symbol of luck like its inspiration.

== Book sources ==
- George, Rose (2009), The Big Necessity: The Unmentionable World of Human Waste and Why It Matters, Macmillan, p. 25, ISBN 9781429925488
- Zatko, Martin (2014), The Rough Guide to Tokyo, Penguin, p. 69, ISBN 9780241011621
