= An Coppens =

Belgian consultant and gamification expert

- Born: 3 June 1971 (age 54); Merksem, Belgium
- Education: Octalysis framework level 1,2,3 – Yukai Chou (2014), Gamification Design Master - Level 1, 2 & 3 from Engagement Alliance (2013), BA (Hon) International Marketing and Languages from Dublin City University (1997) and MBA from the Open University Business School (2001)
- Occupations: Author, speaker, consultant
- Notable work: Leading the boss in the mirror, Attracting IT talent into your business, Gamification in Business, Dial-a-Guru
- Website: www.gamificationnation.com www.ancoppens.com

An Coppens (born June 3, 1971) is a Belgian consultant working in gamification, and the author of Leading the boss in the mirror.

== Early life ==
An Coppens is the eldest child born of Marcel Coppens and Jenny Backx, born in Merksem, Belgium on 3 June 1971. Dad was first a secondary school teacher and then in his later career a sports journalist for a national daily newspaper and smaller print publications. Mum worked in graphic design in the media and publishing industry. An has one younger sister, Gerd Coppens.

She went to SintHenricus secondary school in Antwerp and commenced a degree in interpretation and translation studies with Russian and English at Hoger Instituut voor Vertalers en Tolken at the University of Antwerp.

In 1991 she moved to Ireland and in 1993 commenced studies for a degree in International Marketing and Languages at Dublin City University. She set up B/Right Business Coaching in 2001 in Cork, Ireland and was invited to be a TV guest expert for the RTE (Irish national television) show "How long will you live" in 2007, she contributed in all seasons since its pilot introduction to programming. She was also the co-ordinator for the Cork Schools Enterprise Programme for a number of years. An completed her master's degree in Business Administration from the Open University Business School in 2001, whilst working full-time.

== Career ==
She is the Chief Game Changer at Gamification Nation Ltd. The London-based company provides gamification design services, game design and an online gamification support community to clients worldwide. She also worked for companies such as Arthur Andersen Business Consulting, Xigma Consulting, Philips Electronics, American Express and Modern Times Group. Additionally, she ran a business by the name of B/Right Business Coaching in Ireland.

She has worked for 15 years in developing solutions that encourage winning behaviour in order to improve business results. These have covered the areas of sales, marketing, HR, performance management, learning and development and productivity. The main focus of her work is on employee and learner engagement as well as customer engagement.

She is also a blogger on gamification at gamificationnation.com; she has been listed in the top 10 UK digital and technology bloggers in the UK Blog Awards of 2016 and 2015. She plans to publish her 4th book, "Creating competitive advantage from the inside out through gamification", in autumn/winter 2016 with Pencraft Publishing.

An Coppens has worked with global brands in media, finance, education and FMCG markets.

== Books ==
- Leading the boss in the mirror.
- Attracting IT talent into your business.
- Gamification in Business.
- Dial-a-Guru.

== Awards ==
She has received several awards over the course of her career:

- 2017 her Gamification Agency Gamification Nation LTD won the best Gamification agency 2017 at the Gamification Europe Conference
- 2016 she received an award as a HR technology visionary at the World HRD conference in Mumbai, India
- 2007 European Coaching Achievement Award
- 2009 Cork Rotary Club – Clive Hutchinson Award for exceptional service for youth in the club and district
- 2009-2010 Rotary District 1160 (Ireland and Northern-Ireland) – Youth Opportunities district chairperson
- October 2010 Rookie Award – MTG Modern Services team
- June 2011 awarded Honorary Membership of Cork Rotary club for club and district service work in previous years
