= Thierry Coppens =

Belgian footballer

Personal information
- Date of birth: 2 November 1979 (age 46)
- Place of birth: Belgium
- Height: 1.75 m (5 ft 9 in)
- Position: Goalkeeper

Team information
- Current team: Ronse
- Number: 1

Senior career*
Years	Team	Apps	(Gls)
1999–2006	Union Saint-Gilloise	182	(0)
2006–2007	FC Dender	28	(0)
2007–2010	SV Zulte Waregem		
2010–	Ronse		
- * Club domestic league appearances and goals as of 8 May 2010

Thierry Coppens (born 2 November 1979) is a Belgian professional football goalkeeper. He currently plays for Ronse.
