= Philippe Starck =

French architect and industrial designer (born 1949)

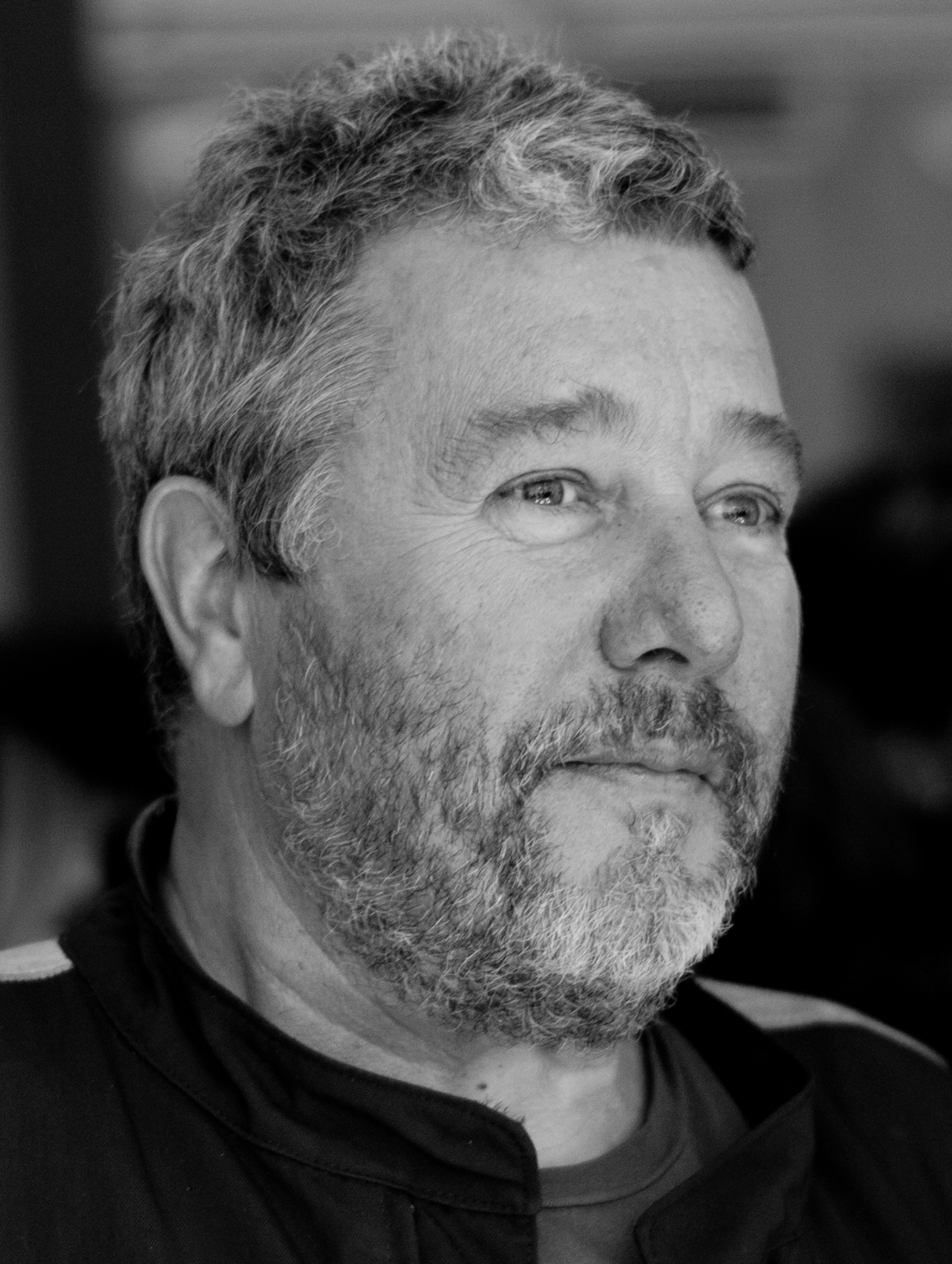
- Starck in 2011
- Born: 18 January 1949 (age 77); Paris, France
- Education: École Nissim de Camondo
- Occupation: Architect
- Children: Ara Starck, Oa Starck, K Starck, Lago Starck, Justice Starck
- Parent(s): André Starck, Jacqueline Starck
- Awards: Legion of Honour; Lucky Strike Designer Award; Ordre des Arts et des Lettres
- Buildings: Asahi Beer Hall
- Website: starck.com

Brief interview by Dezeen

Philippe Starck (French pronunciation: [filip staʁk]; born 18, January 1949) is a French industrial architect and designer known for his wide range of designs, including interior design, architecture, household objects, furniture, boats and other vehicles. His most popular pieces were made in the 1980s and the 1990s. He is considered one of the pioneers of democratic design, aiming to offer the best possible service while using the minimum of materials, in order to improve the life of the user.

According to an interview published in Business Traveller in May 2026, Starck claims to have undertaken over 10,000 projects, including 220 architectural projects and 43 hotels.

In 2026, Philippe Starck was awarded with the Lifetime Achievement Award by the European Union Intellectual Property Office (EUIPO).

== Life ==
Starck was born on 18, January 1949 in Paris. He is the son of André Starck, who was an aeronautics engineer. He says that his father often inspired him because he was an engineer, who made invention a "duty". His family is originally from, and lived in, the Alsace region, before his grandfather moved to Paris. He studied at the École Nissim de Camondo in Paris.

== Career ==
While working for Adidas, Starck set up his first industrial design company, Starck Product, which he later renamed Ubik after Philip K. Dick's novel. For this company, he built relationships with manufacturers across Europe including: Driade, Alessi, and Kartell, in Italy, Drimmer in Austria, Vitra in Switzerland, and Disform and Andreu World in Spain.

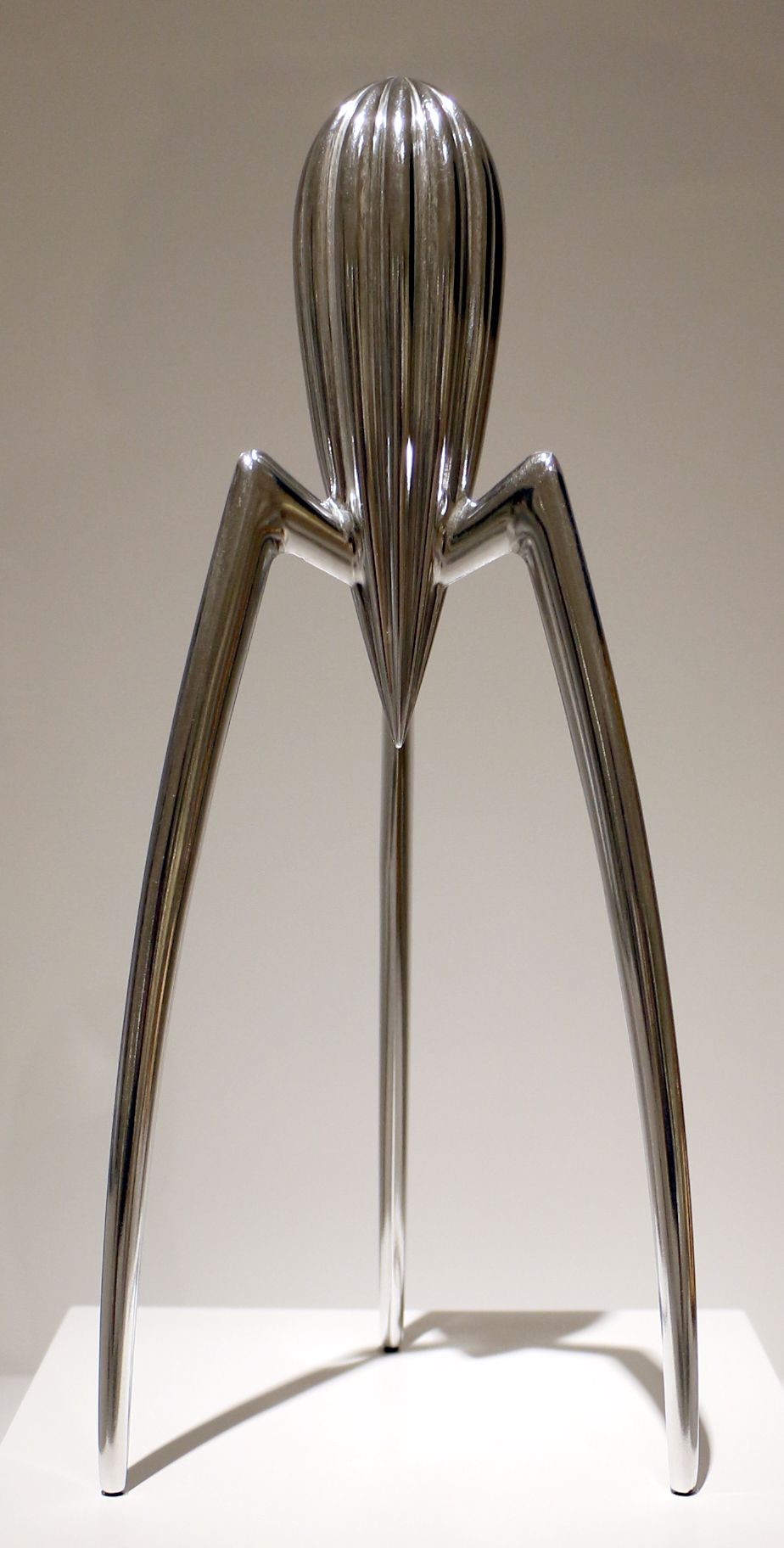
Juicy Salif edited by Alessi

In 1983, then-French President François Mitterrand, on the recommendation of his Minister of Culture, Jack Lang, chose Starck to refurbish the president's private apartments at the Élysée. The following year he designed the Café Costes. One of his best-known creations is the Juicy Salif for Alessi in 1987 and the Louis Ghost Chair for Kartell (2000), which sold over two million copies.

After this, Starck's output expanded to include furniture, decoration, architecture, street furniture, industry (wind turbines, photo booths), bathroom fittings, kitchens, floor, and wall coverings, lighting, domestic appliances, office equipment such as staplers, utensils, tableware, clothing, accessories, toys, glassware, graphic design and publishing, food, and vehicles for land, sea, air and space.

=== Architecture ===
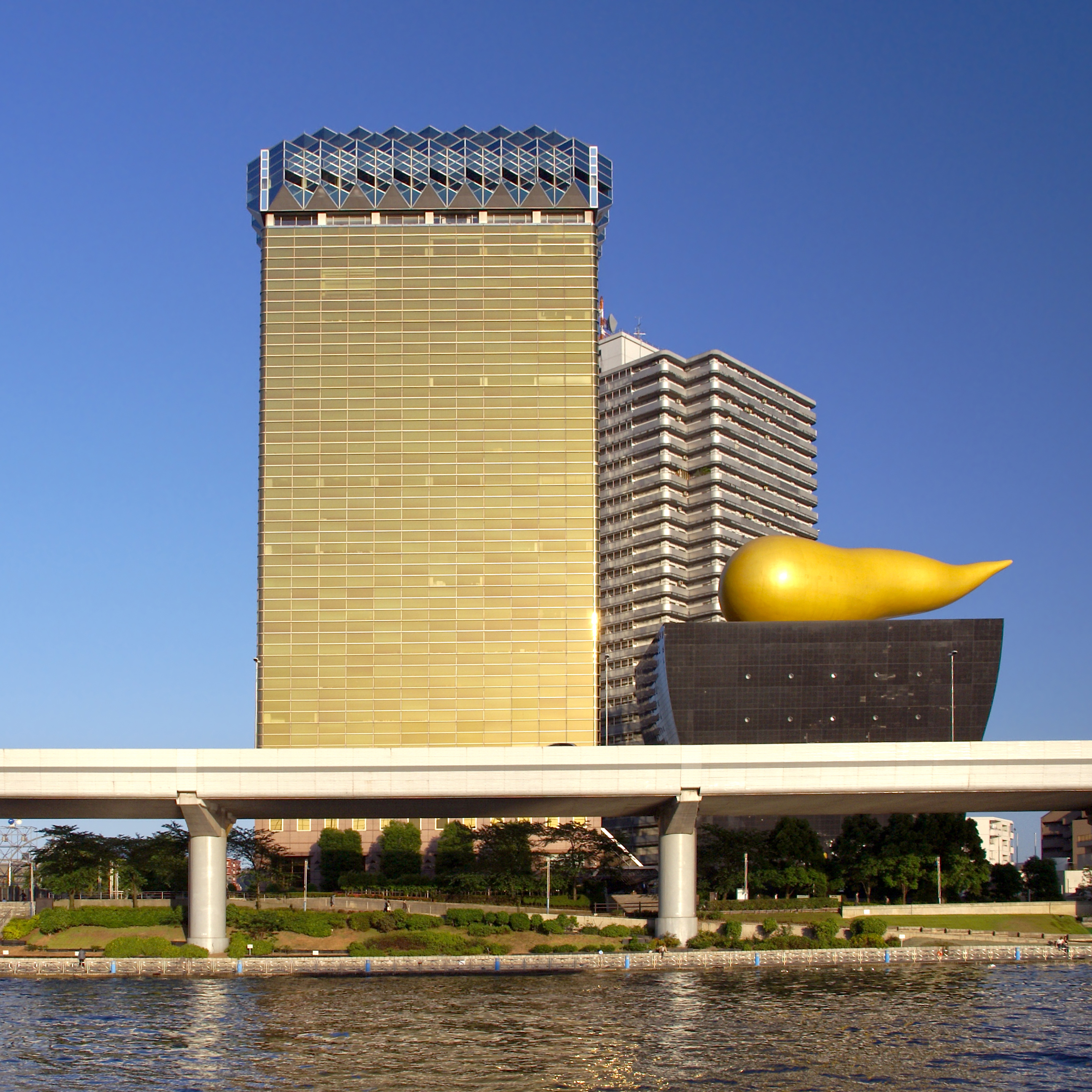
Asahi Breweries Headquarters

The buildings Starck designed in Japan, starting in 1989, went against the grain of traditional forms. The first, Nani Nani, in Tokyo, was described as a biomorphic shed. A year later he designed the Asahi Beer Hall in Tokyo, a building topped with a golden flame. This was followed in 1992 by Le Baron Vert office complex in Osaka.

In France, with Luc Arsène-Henry, Starck designed the extension of the École Nationale Supérieure des Arts Décoratifs (ENSAD) in Paris (1998).

In 1991, Starck designed one of the pavilions for the new Groninger Museum.

In 2006, Phillippe Starck partnered with the luxury hospitality company SBE (founded by Sam Nazarian) and sushi chef Katsuya Uechi to launch "Katsuya" in Brentwood, California. The Katsuya brand expanded and opened locations in Hollywood, Las Vegas, Miami, and across the Middle East.

At the 2024 Italian F1 Grand Prix in Monza, Alpine and Philippe Starck unveil the new motorhome for the French Alpine F1 Team.

In October 2024, LA Almazara, entirely imagined by Philippe Starck, opened in Ronda in Andalusia. The project is the first olive oil mill designed by an internationally renowned designer. It features an oil press, museum, and restaurant. It is present in the list of the World's Greatest Places of 2025 by the Times magazine.

Since the late 1980s, Starck has designed several hotels in different countries, these include the Royalton Hotel (1988) and the lobby of the Paramount Hotel (1990) in New York City, the Delano in Miami, the Hudson Hotel, the Mondrian Hotel in West Hollywood, the Sanderson, the Saint Martin's Lane in London, Le Meurice renovations in 2016, the Royal Monceau (2010) and, more recently, the Hotel Brach (2018) and the Hotel 9Confidentiel (2018), in Paris. Also in France, in the South West, Philippe Starck designed La Co(o)rniche and Ha(a)itza hotels, both in Arcachon, near the Dune of Pilat. In 2019, Starck created the Lily of the Valley Hotel on the French Riviera and in 2020, opened La Réserve Eden au Lac Zurich.

In 2022 Philippe Starck was appointed artistic director of the TOO Hotel, which opened its doors at the top of one of Jean Nouvel's DUO Towers in Paris. In the same year, he collaborated once again with architect Jean Nouvel to design the Rosewood Sao Paulo, a hotel in which most of the materials used were locally sourced and inspired by Brazilian culture. In the 2026 edition of The World's 50 Best Hotels ranking, Rosewood São Paulo obtained the sixth place in the world. Also in 2022, Cyril Aouizerate, Michel Reybier and Philippe Starck joined forces to open the MOB House hotel and restaurant in Saint-Ouen, a concept designed for longer stays.

In 2023, Philippe Starck was appointed artistic director of Mondrian Bordeaux les Carmes, a hotel in the heart of Bordeaux's Chartrons district, inspired by Japanese culture and featuring typical Bordeaux architecture.

Starck has designed several restaurants, including in the early years, the Café Costes (1984) in Paris, Manin (1985) in Tokyo, Theatron (1985) in Mexico City, Teatriz (1990) in Madrid, and, more recently, several restaurants with the Alajmo brothers in Paris, Venice and Milan: Caffe Stern (2014), Amo (2016), Gran Caffe Quadri (2018) and Amor (2019), La Réserve à la Plage in Saint Tropez, with Michel Reybier Hospitality, and The Avenue at Saks in New York in 2019.

The Alhondiga, a 43,000 square-meter culture and leisure venue in Bilbao designed by Starck, opened in 2010.

Starck also designed affordable and adjustable pre-fabricated P.A.T.H. houses.

Starck was commissioned by the Hilton Worldwide to create an entirely new hotel in Metz, France. Maison Heler is a phantasmagoric building topped by a traditional Alsatian house, a poetic symbol of the region that opened in 2025.

In March 2026, Starck unveiled Nhà Estate in Vietnam, his first residential development in the country. Located on a peninsula between the Ray River and the South China Sea in Ho Tram, near Ho Chi Minh City, the estate comprises 38 private villas commissioned by developers Larfa Properties and AppleTree Group, each individually designed to integrate with the surrounding natural landscape.

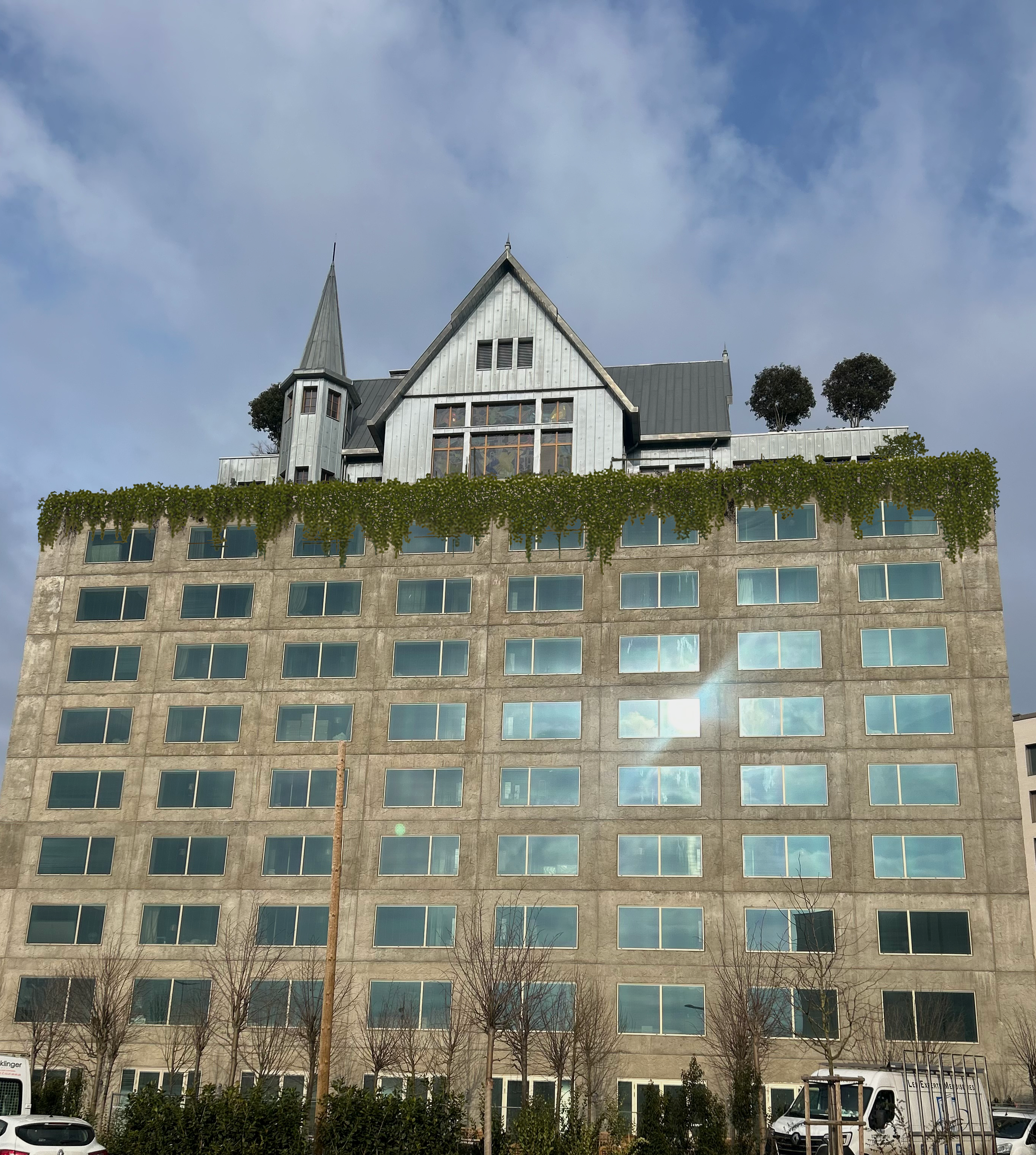
Maison Heler, 2025

Also in 2026, Starck designed the interiors of Villa Colette, the first five-star hotel on the Cap Ferret peninsula, in the Arcachon Bay area. The property, developed by Laurent Taïeb, founder of Paris Society, comprises 28 rooms and suites housed in a neo-19th-century building, and includes a restaurant headed by chef Benjamin Six.

=== Yacht design ===
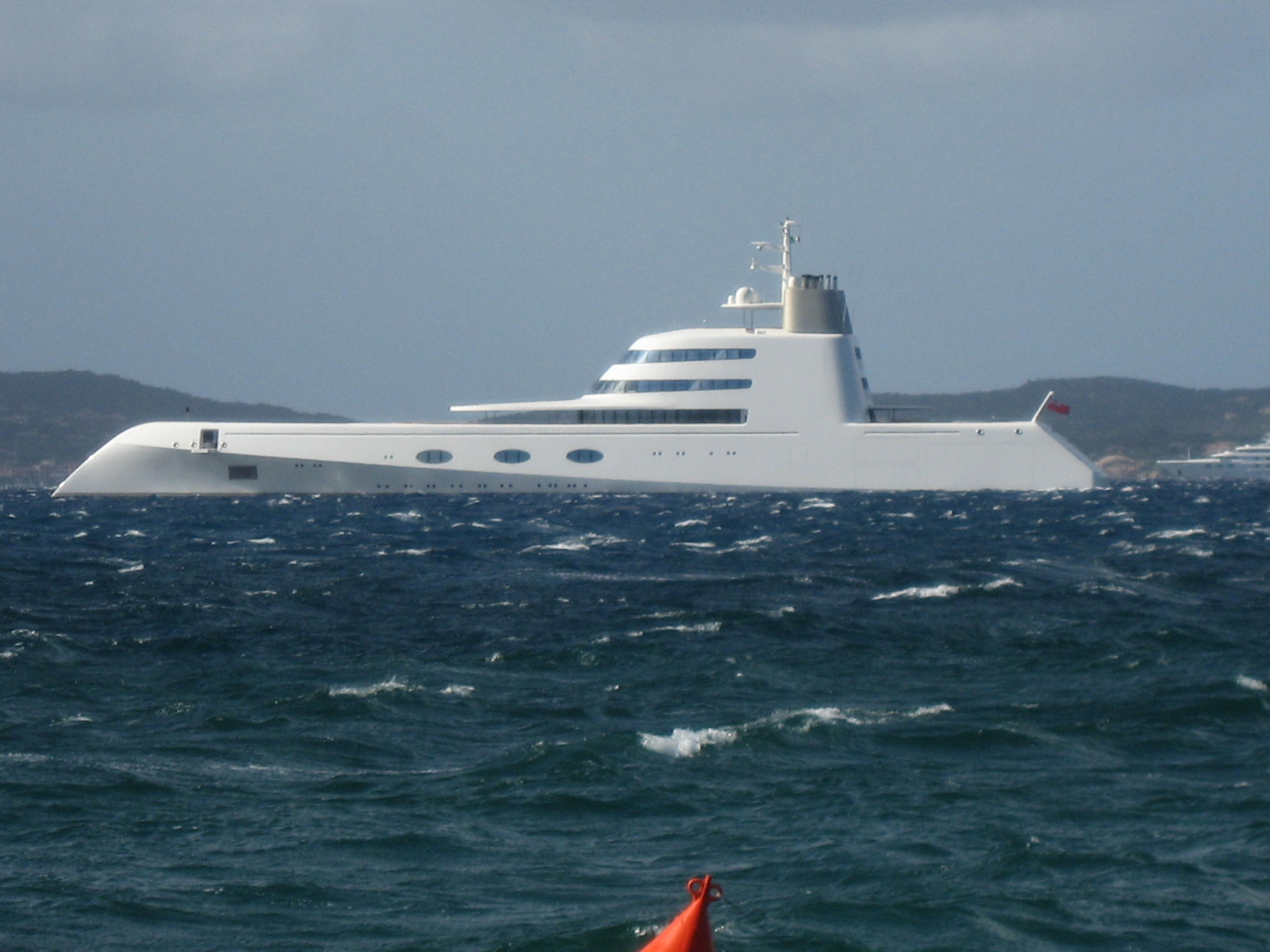
A (motor yacht)

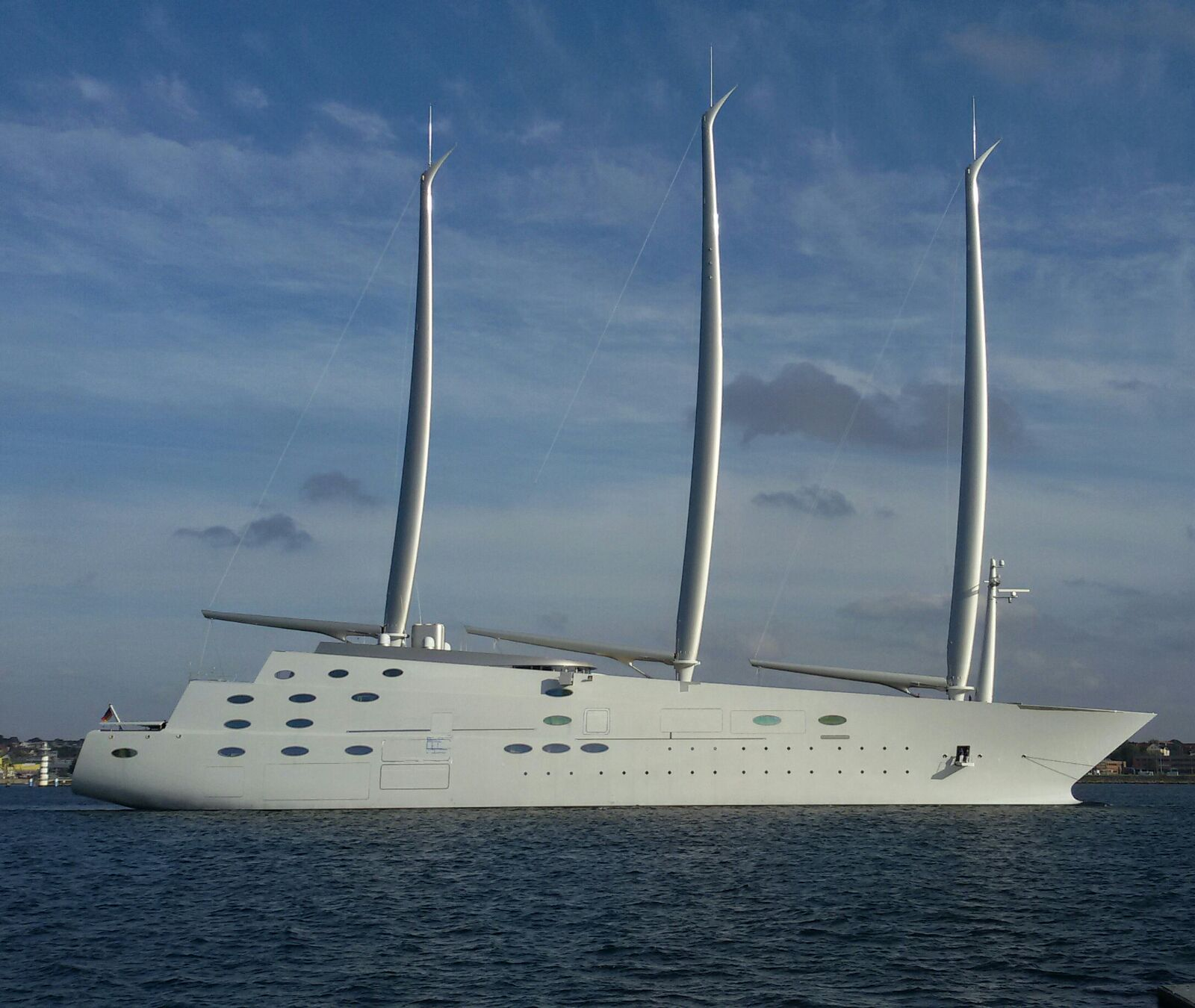
A (sailing yacht)

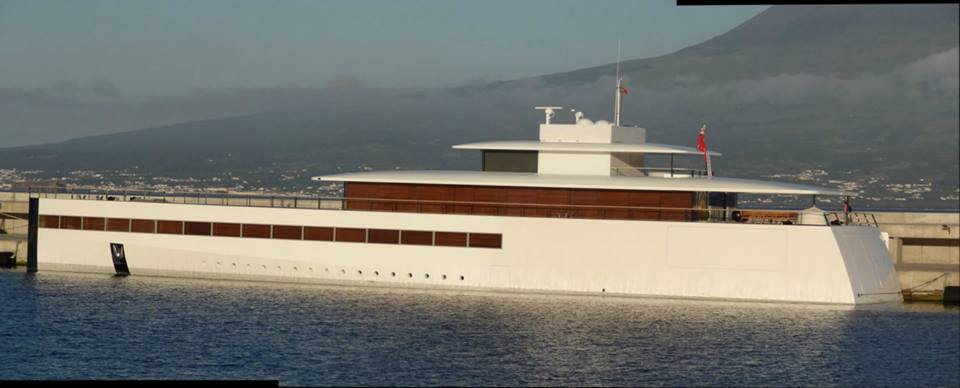
Venus motor yacht

Starck designed the Wedge Too, a 65 m (213 ft) superyacht, built by Feadship and launched in 2002.

In 2004, commissioned by Russian Oligarch Andrey Melnichenko, Starck designed the Motor Yacht A and then, in 2012, A (sailing yacht), one of the world's largest sailing yachts.

Starck designed the luxury marina renovation in the Port Adriano harbor, on the south-west bay of Palma de Mallorca It opened in April 2012.

In 2008, he designed for Steve Jobs the 78 m (256 ft) superyacht Venus, launched in October 2012, just over a year after Jobs' death. The yacht was built at Aalsmeer in the Netherlands.

=== Furniture design ===
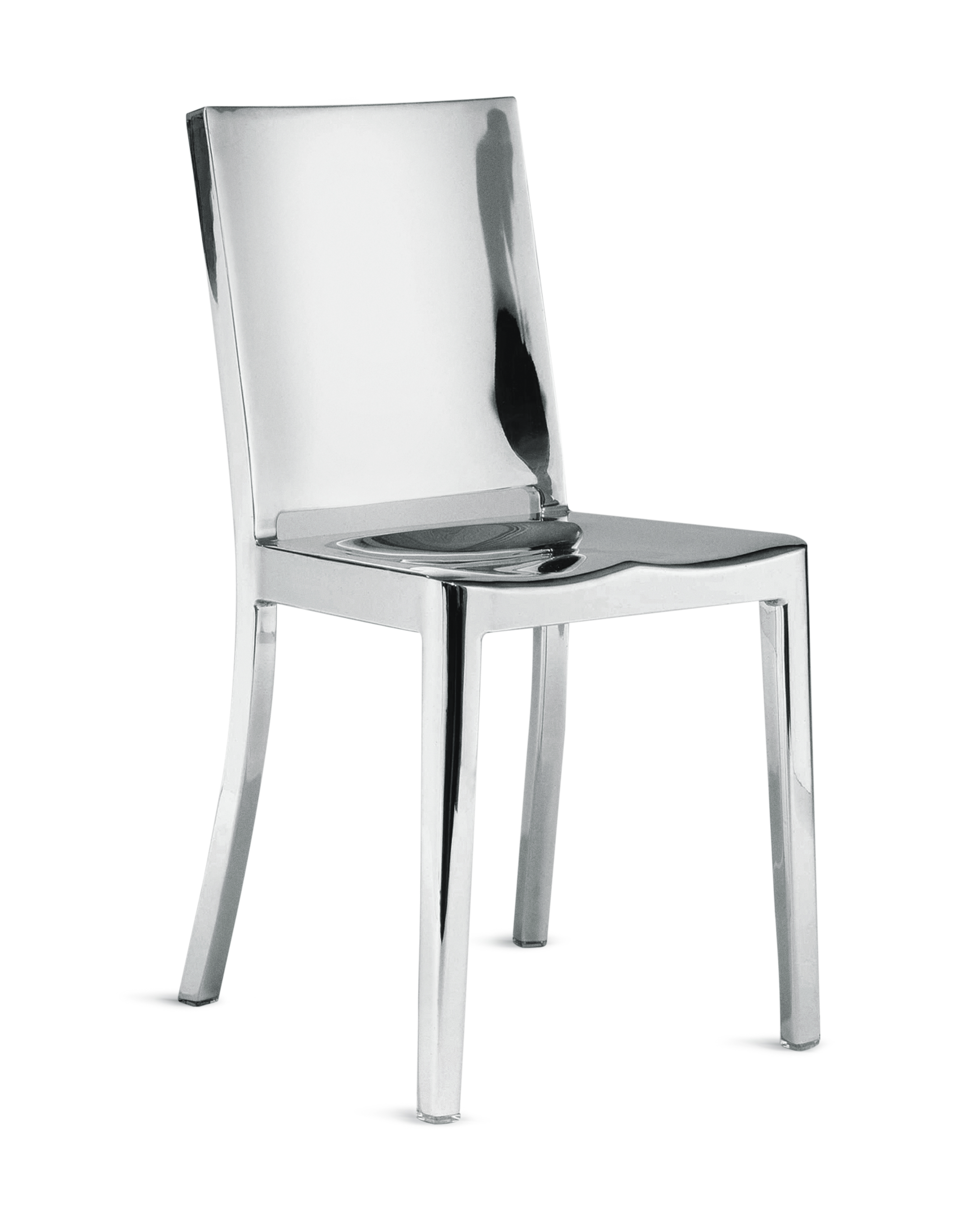
Hudson chair designed for Emeco (2000)

Zartan, created for Magis by Stark in 2010, is a chair entirely made from natural material like bamboo, linen and hemp fiber, a non-toxic and biodegradable alternative to replace plastic.

In 2012, Starck released Broom for Emeco, an anti-waste chair made of materials collected in lumber and plastic plants.

Starck released Cassina Croque la pomme in 2019, a furniture collection for Cassina, entirely made from a vegan fabric, with apple leather. In the same year, he created Smart Wood for Kartell, a collection of seats designed with a minimum of material thanks to a molding technique using wood residues.

For Salone del Mobile 2022, Dior Maison invited Starck to reinterpret the timeless Médallion seat.

=== Technology ===
In 1996, Starck worked with Alain Mikli to launch Starck Eyes. In 2013 Luxottica bought Starck Eyes and renamed it Starck Biotech Paris in 2019. Starck Biotech Paris is inspired by the human body to create revolutionary eyewear, merging design with biomechanics.

Starck helped design the Xiaomi Mi MIX smartphone, notable for having a 6.4-inch "whole surface screen".

In 2016, Starck developed a GPS-tracking wristband, DIAL (Individual Alert and Localization Device) for Société Nationale de Sauvetage en Mer, which allows endangered people to share their exact location with rescue services from the sea or the beach.

In 2018, Starck collaborated with Axiom Space and created the interior of the International Space Station's housing module – a comfortable and luxurious living space adapted to weightlessness, with suede-textured walls, big windows to appreciate the view and all the technology needed to stay connected.

In 2019, Starck unveiled the A.I. chair to the public. The A.I. chair was developed in collaboration with experts of the 3D software company Autodesk and designed with help of Artificial Intelligence. In 2024 and in 2025 at the Salone del Mobile in Milan, Philippe Starck presents two new versions of the A.I. chair, the A.I.O.R.I. which is folding and the A.I. Lite, a lighter chair with no armrests edited by Kartell.

In 2021 Starck teams up with Delta Café to create RISE Delta Q, a coffee machine featuring the RISE system, a revolutionary reverse coffee extraction process.

In spring 2023, Baliston by Starck launches a collection of shoes featuring augmented technology and 100% recyclability. They incorporate a patented sensor module that analyzes the way the wearer moves to provide personalized information and recommendations. The same year, at COP 28 in Dubai, the HRS by Starck refueling stations were presented. These hydrogen refueling stations are accessible to all, considerably reducing fossil fuel emissions.

=== Collections ===
Starck's work is seen in the collections of European and American museums, including the Musée National d'Art Moderne (to which he has donated several pieces, in particular, prototypes) the Musée des Arts Décoratifs in Paris, MOMA and the Brooklyn Museum in New York City, the Vitra Design Museum in Basel and the Design Museum in London. More than 660 of his designs were inventoried in French public collections in 2011.

== Philosophy ==
=== Democratic design ===
Starck's concept of democratic design led him to focus on mass-produced consumer goods rather than one-off pieces, seeking ways to reduce cost and improve quality in mass market goods.

Through his "democratic design" concept, Starck has campaigned for well-designed objects that are affordable to the masses. He has expressed this as a utopian ideal, approached in practice by increasing production quantities to cut costs and by using mail-order, via Les 3 Suisses. In 1998, Starck established the Good Goods catalogue with La Redoute, proposing 170 sustainable and respectful everyday life objects "for the future moral market". In 2000 he worked with Target Stores and proposed a collection of more than 50 products.

Starck released Ideas Box in 2011 for Bibliothèques Sans Frontières. These kit media libraries give refugee populations access to culture and information and can be installed anywhere around the world providing screens, books, games, cameras and more.

Starck has been involved in the development of Fluocaril toothbrushes and Laguiole Knives.

Working with electric bicycle maker Moustache Bikes, Starck designed the M.A.S.S. (Mud, Asphalt, Sand and Snow) line, released in 2014. The collection comprised four ebikes, each intended to handle a particular terrain, powered by a Bosch motor.

In January 2013, Starck redesigned the Navigo travel pass.

In 2016, the SNSM called on Philippe Starck to come up with the design for a portable warning device, he graciously created the design for DIAL – an individual warning and location device.

Philippe Starck also designed the cauldron and Olympic flame for the 1992 Winter Olympics in Albertville, as well as the Panneaux Histoire de Paris (sometimes called “Starck shovels” or “Starck lollipops”) installed in 1992 during Jacques Chirac's last municipal term.

In 2023, to celebrate 160 years of Perrier, Philippe Starck reimagines the iconic green bottle with the new Perrier + Starck limited edition. His design echoes the Fresnel lens and its diffraction.

== Gallery ==
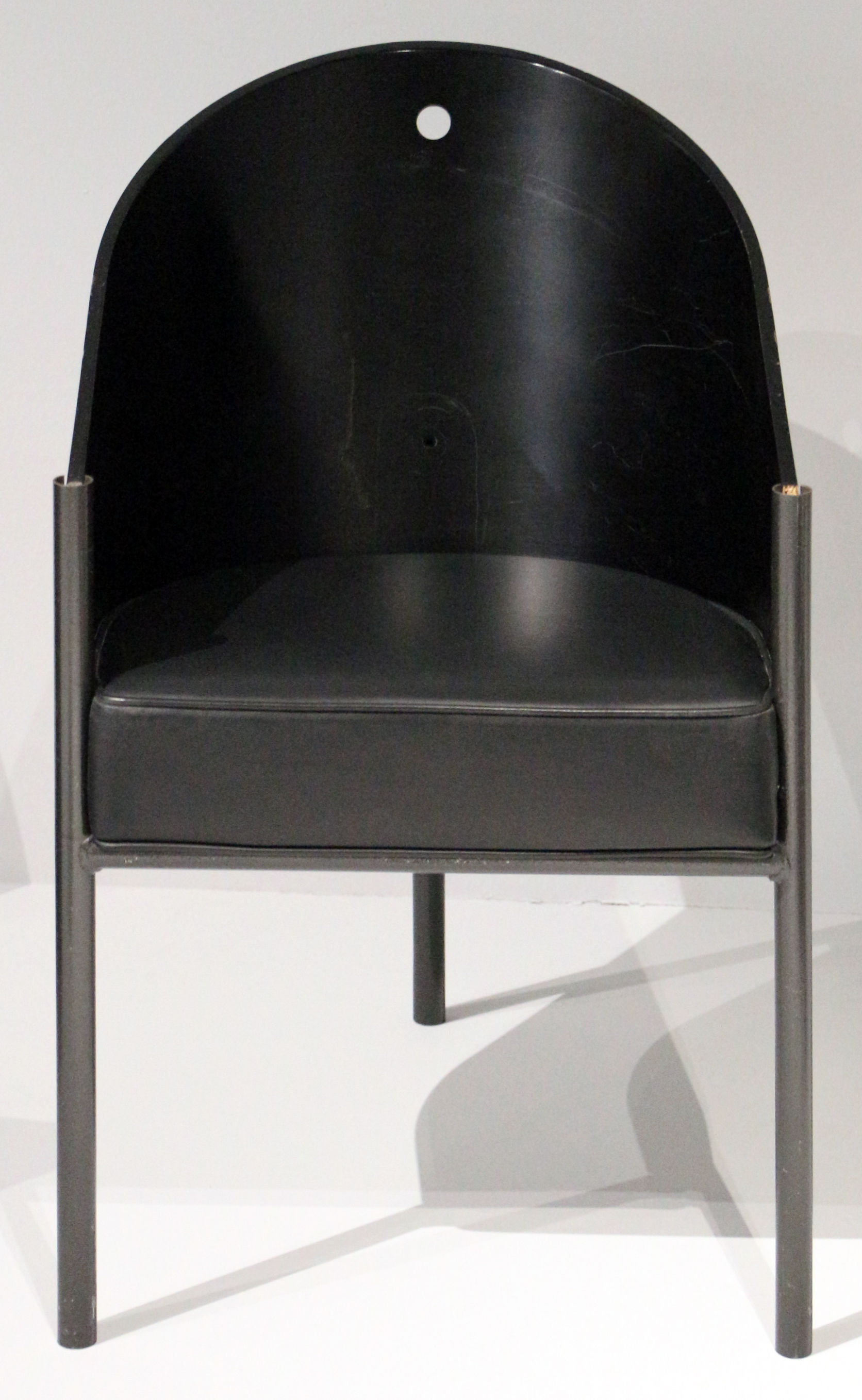
Chaise Costes, Centre Georges Pompidou (1981)

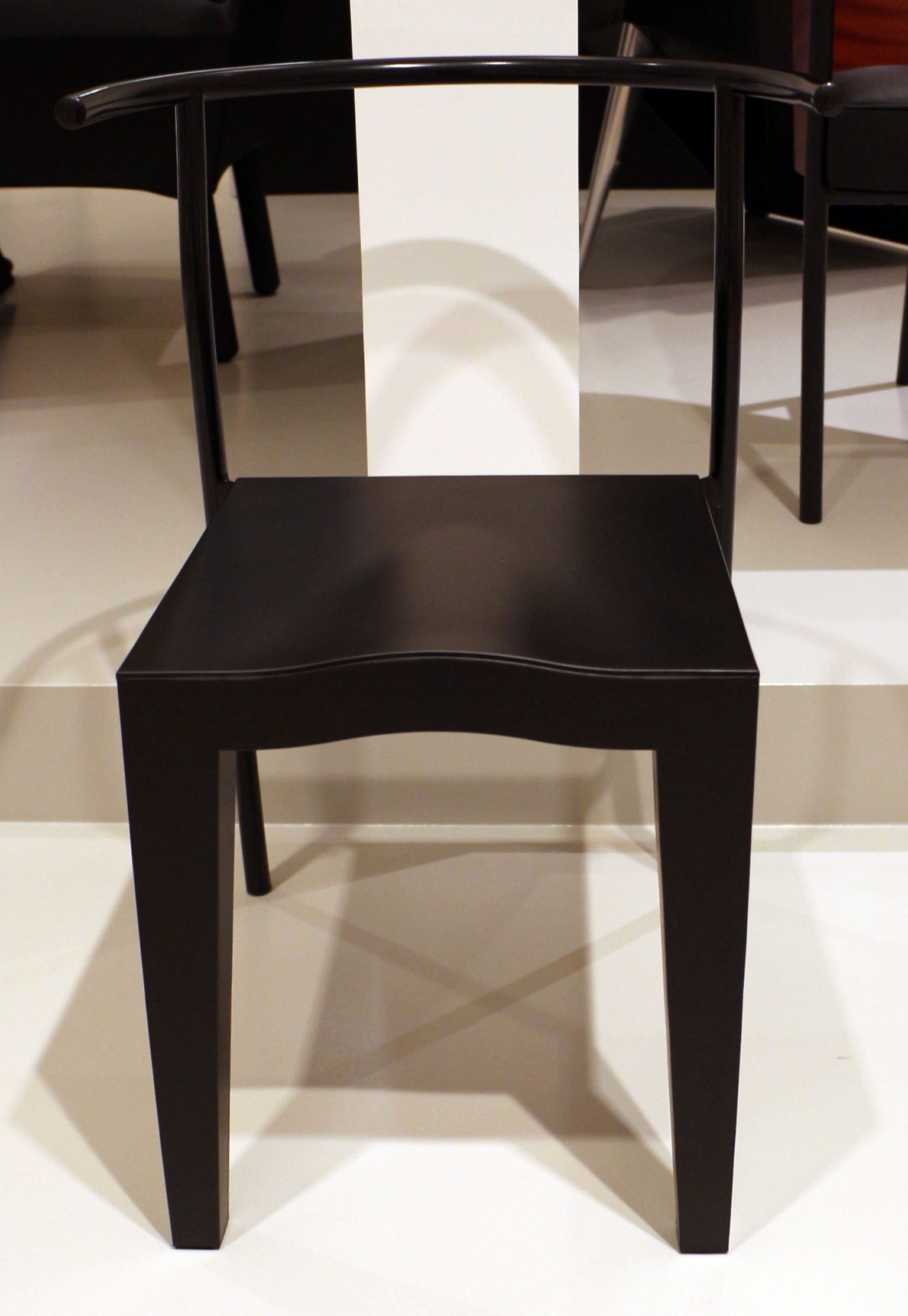
Dr. Glob Chair, Kartell Indianapolis Museum of Art (1988)

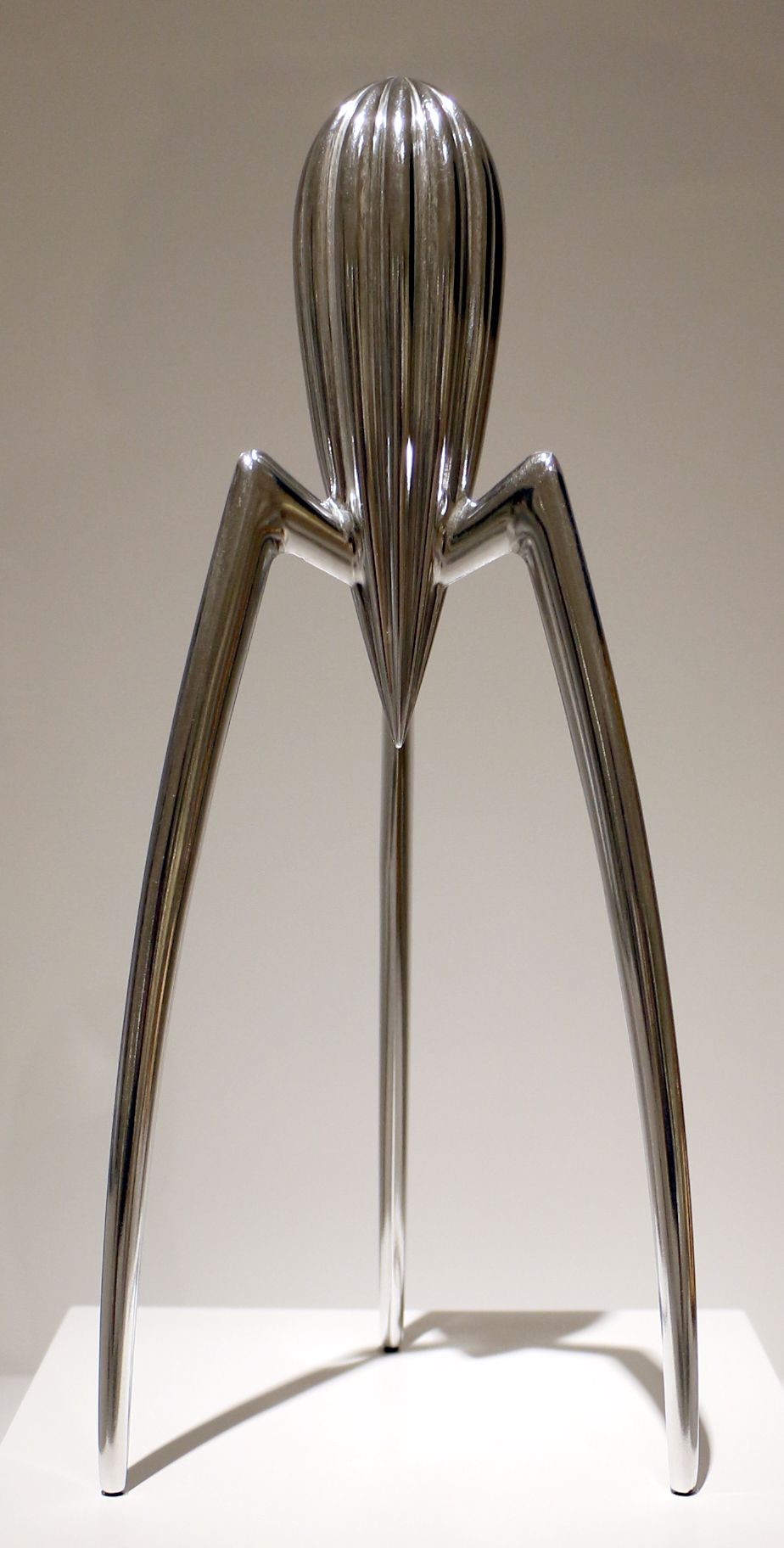
Juicy Salif, Alessi, Indianapolis Museum of Art (1990)

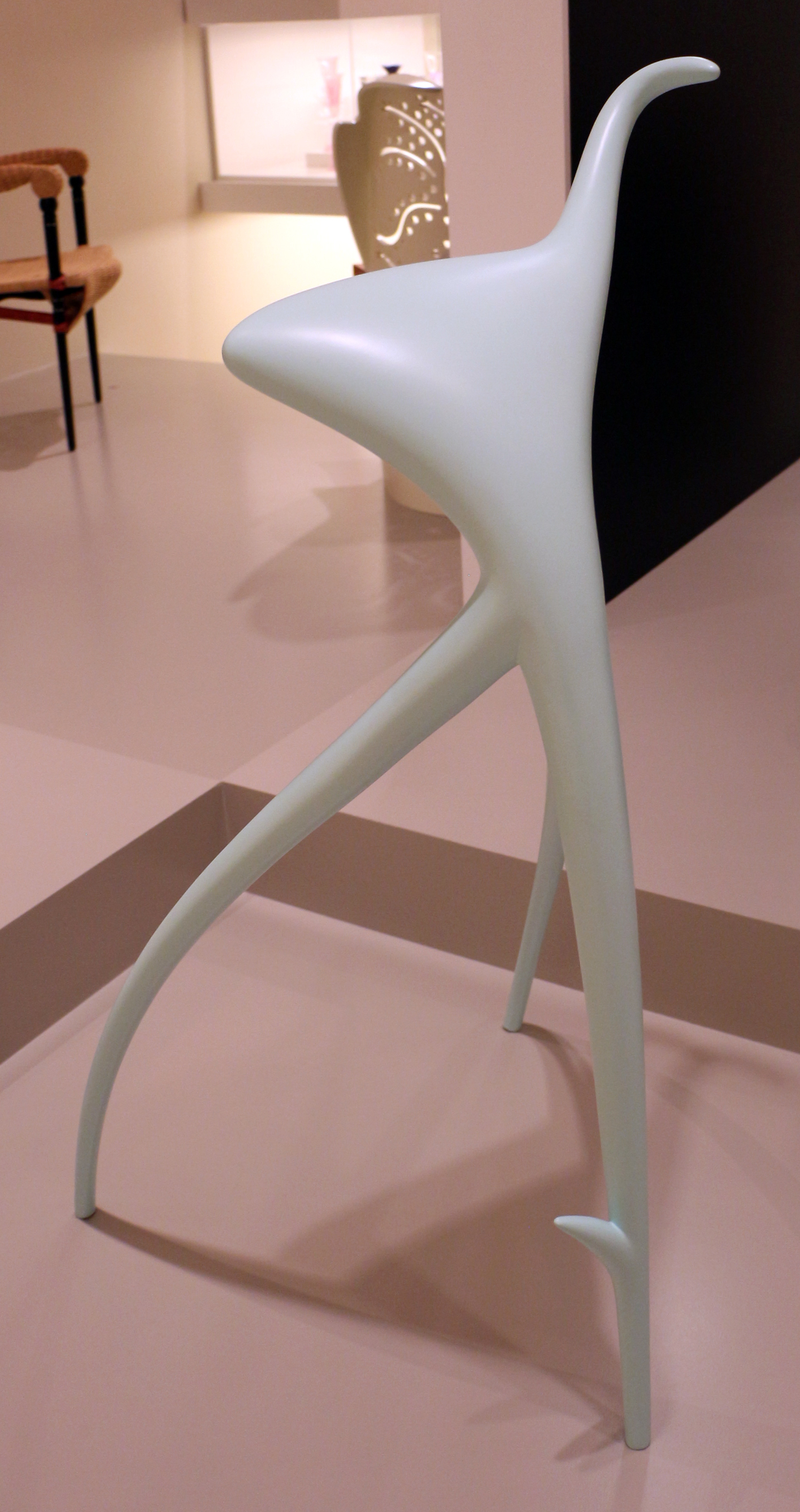
Tabouret WW, Vitra, Indianapolis Museum of Art (1990)

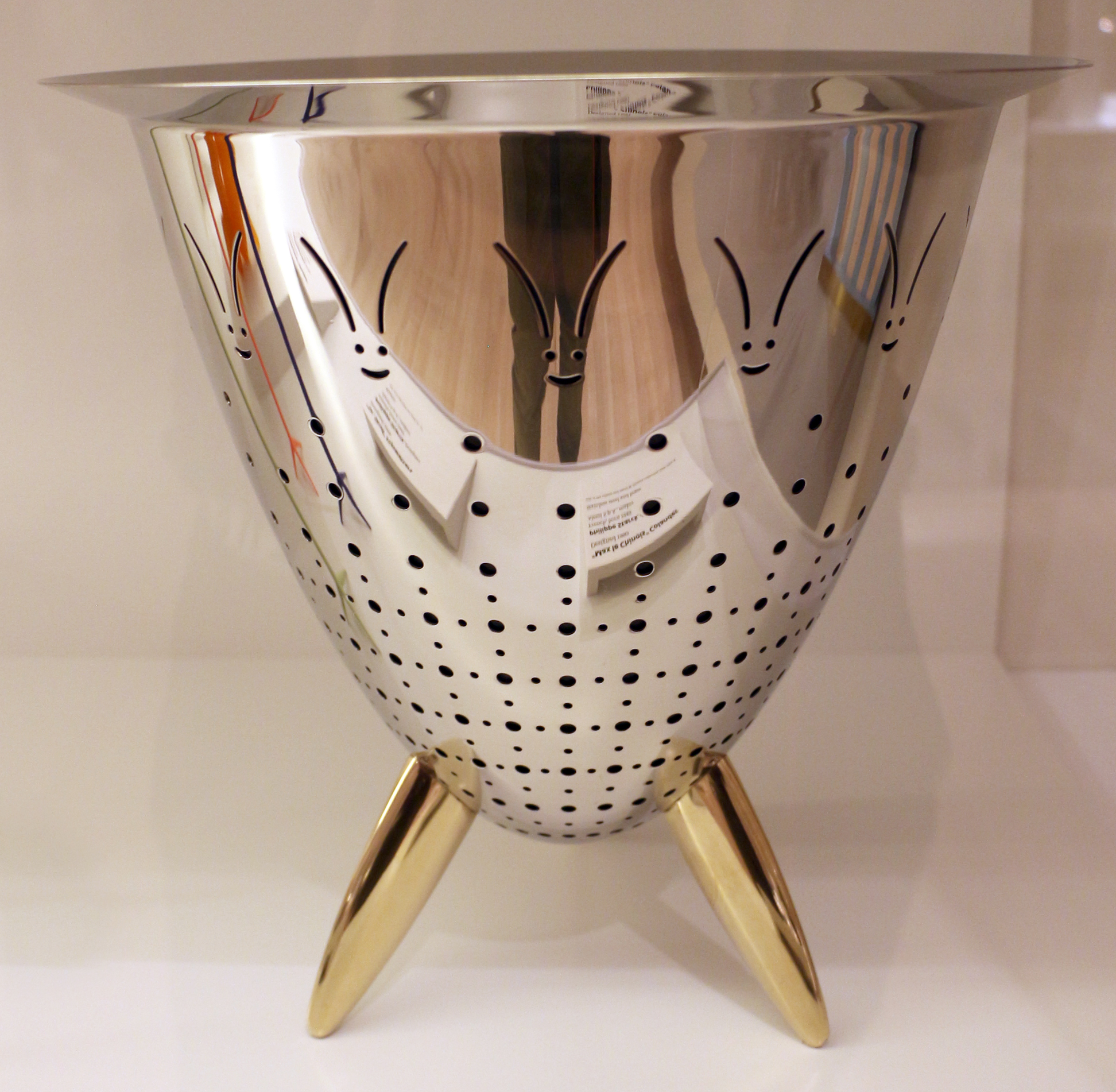
Colander for Alessi (1990)

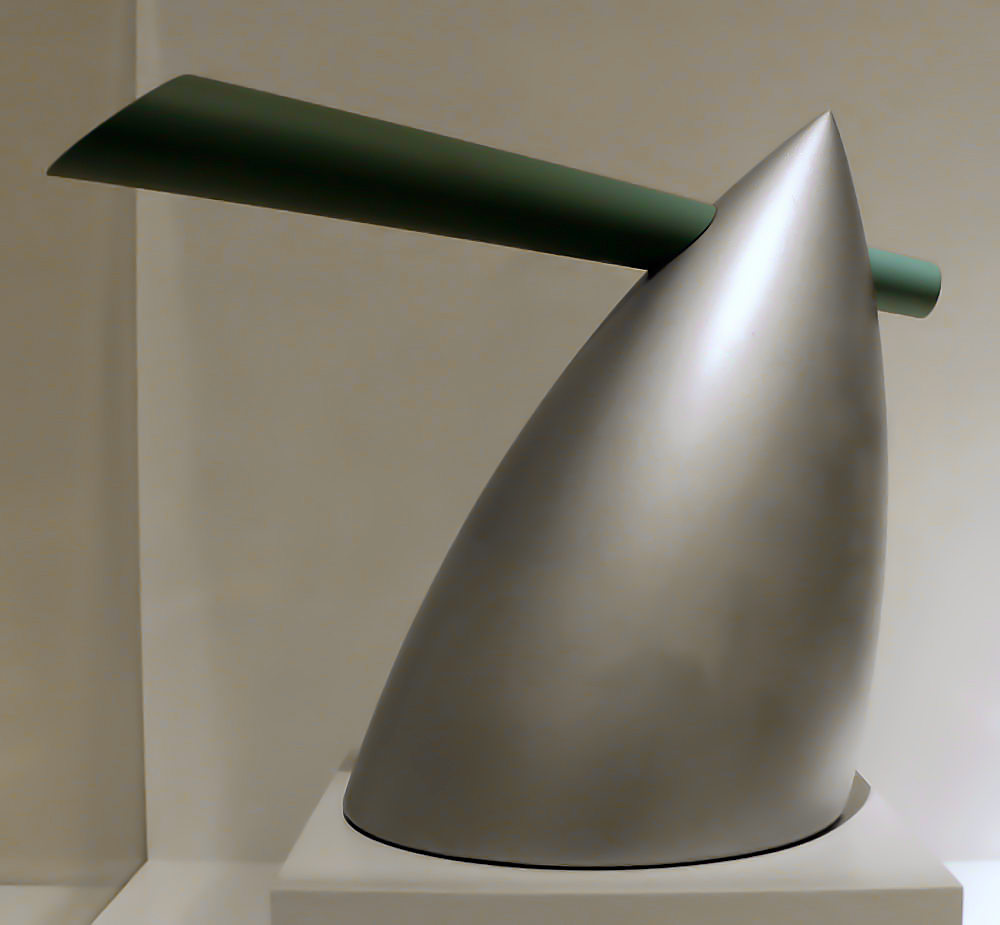
Hot Bertaa - Kettle for Alessi (1990)

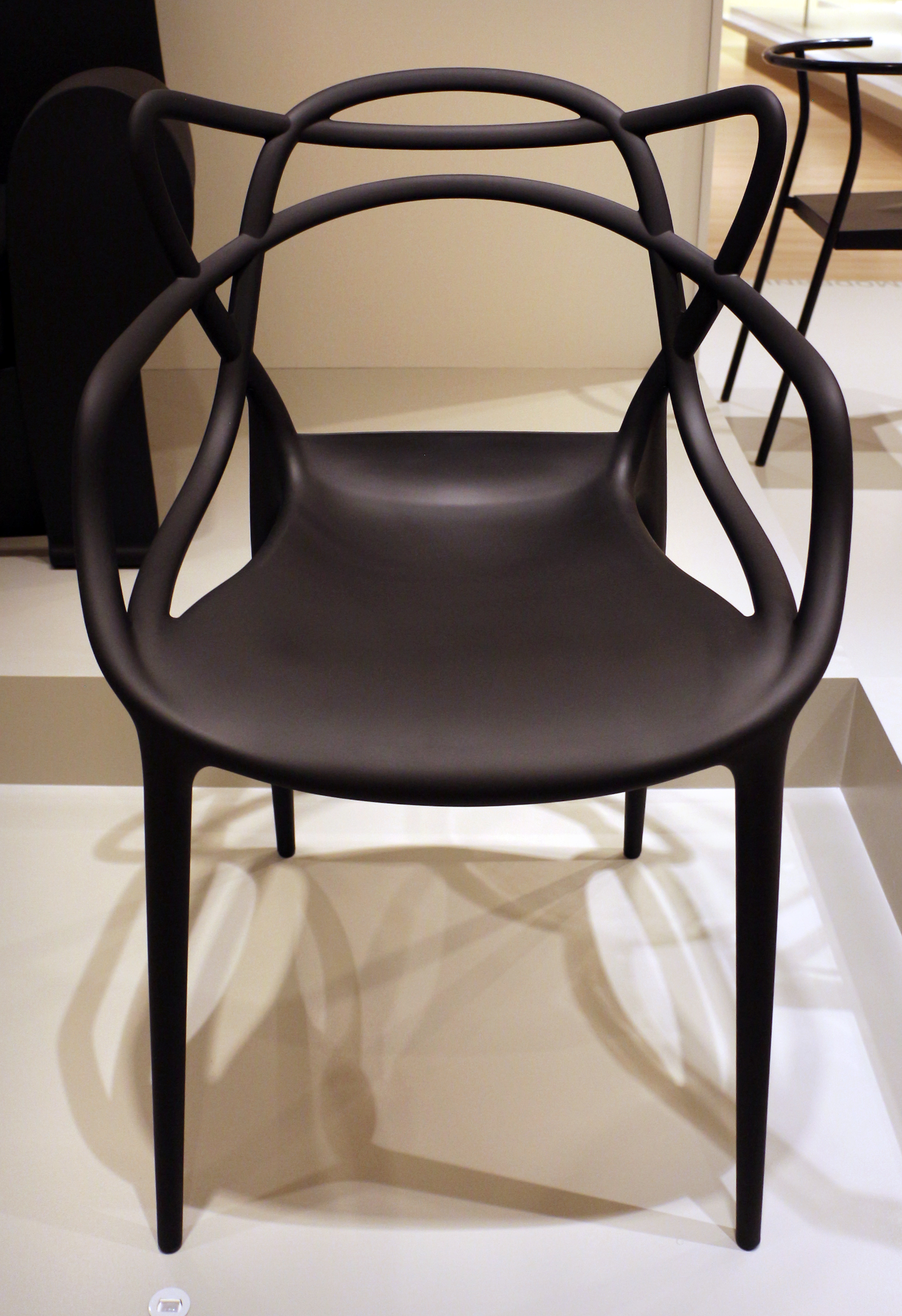
Masters Chair, homage to the masters, Arne Jacobsen, Charles Eames, Eero Saarinen, Kartell, Indianapolis Museum of Art (2002)

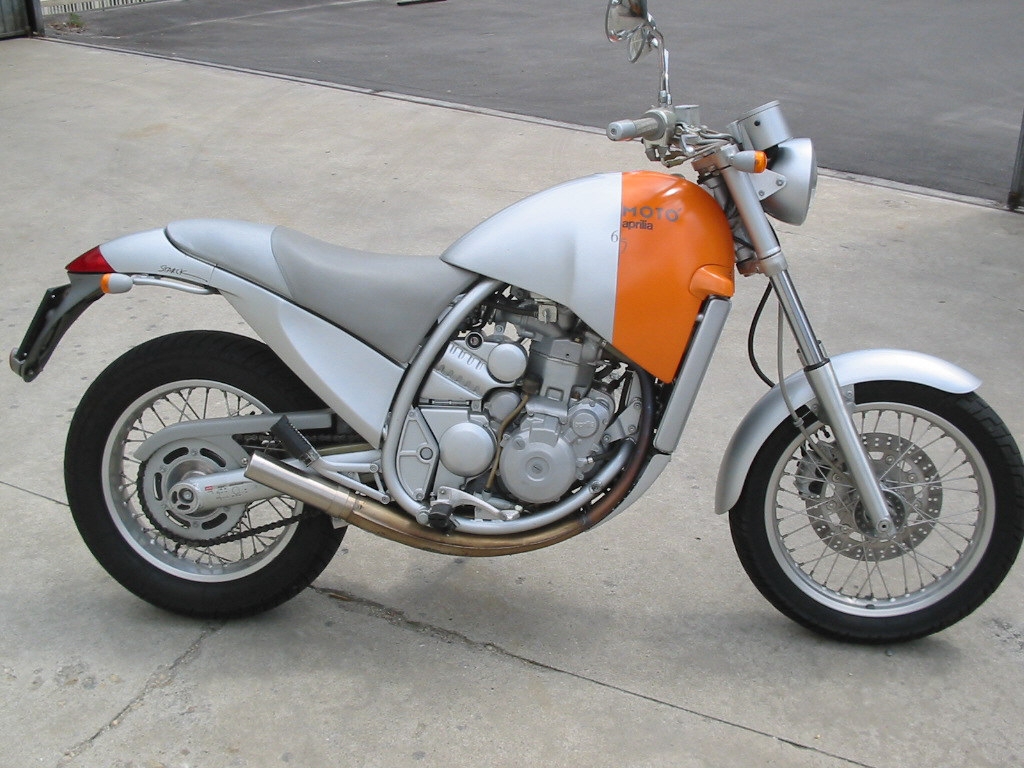
Aprilia Moto 6.5

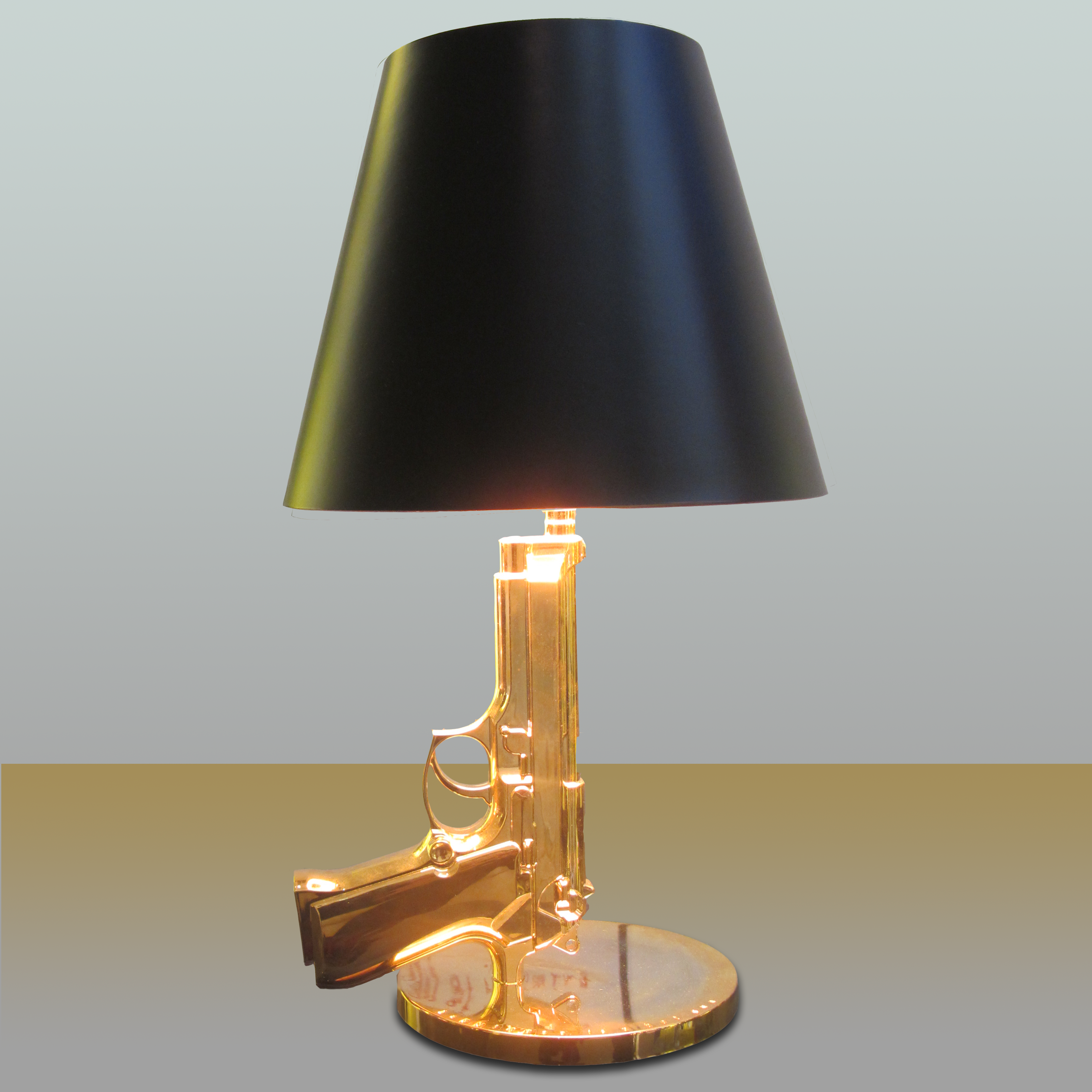
Gold plated gun lamp designed for Flos (2005)

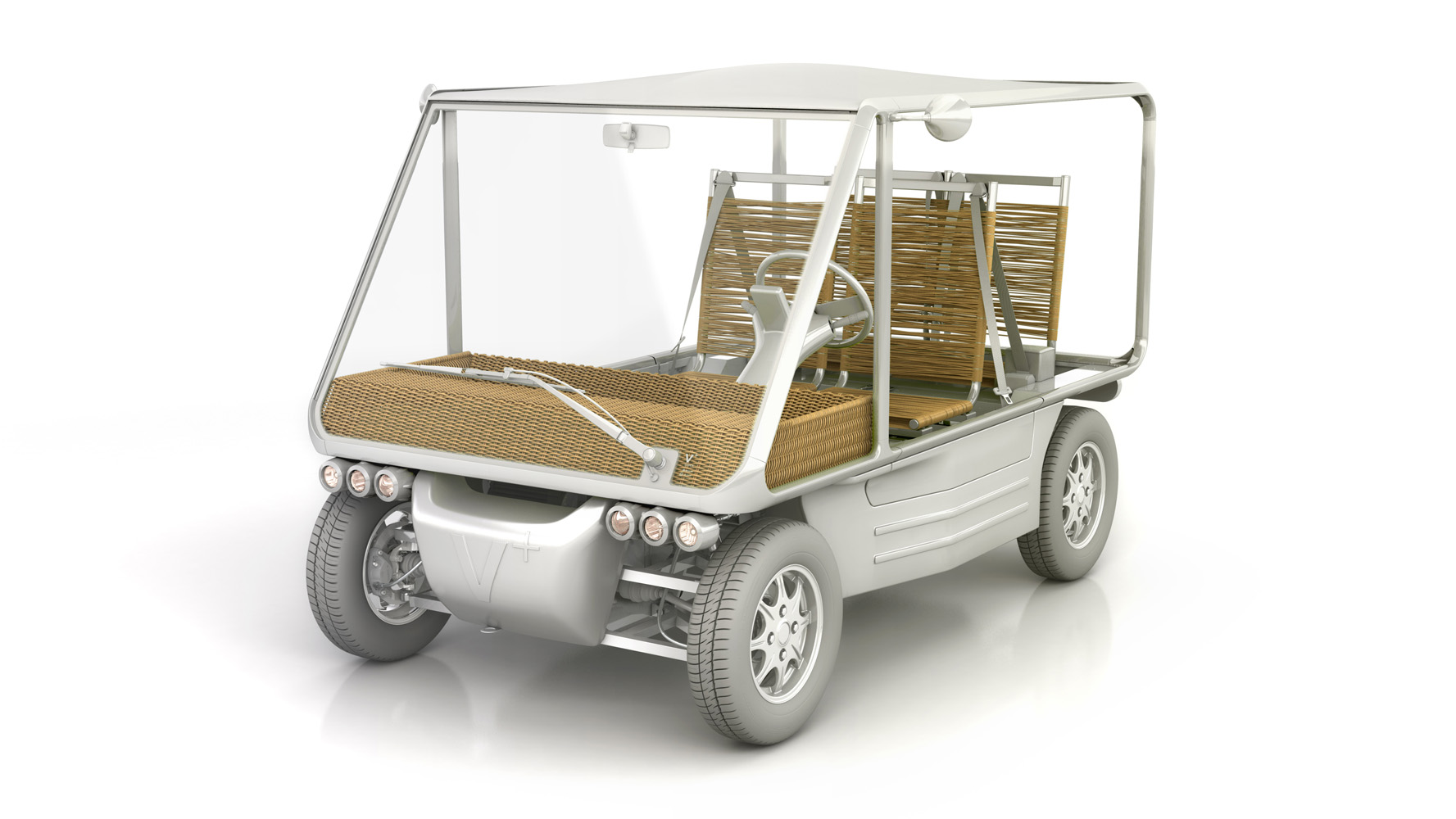
Volteis V+ by Starck (2012)

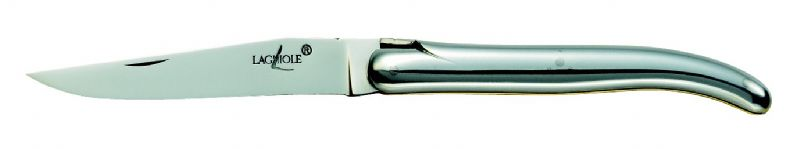
Laguiole knife

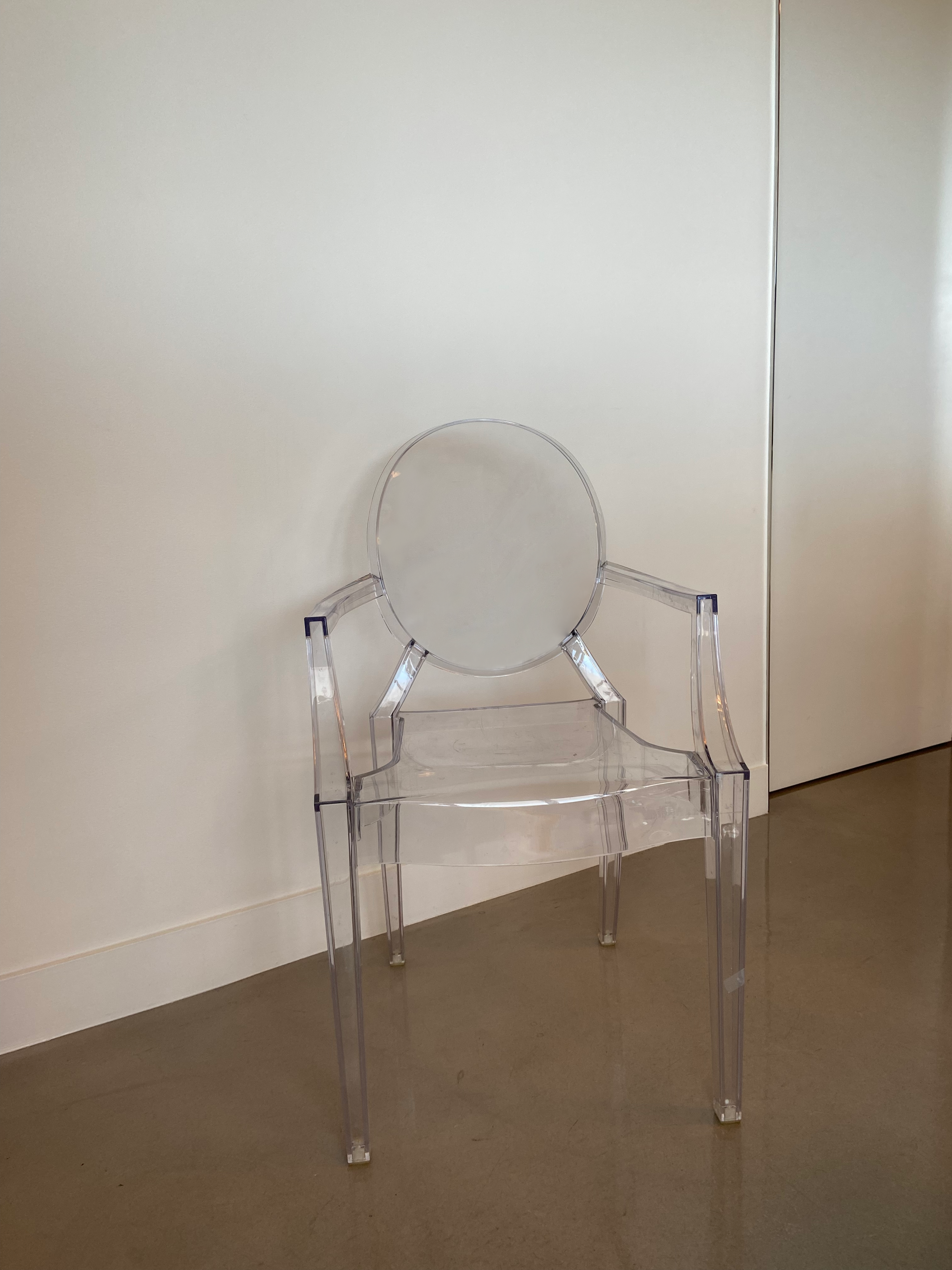
Louis Ghost Chair for Kartell (2000)

== Publications ==
- Lloyd Morgan, Conway (1999). Starck. Universe Publishing. ISBN 978-0789302274.
- Sweet, Fay (1999). Philippe Starck : subverchic design. Watson-Guptill. ISBN 9780823012008.
- Bertoni, Franco (1994). The architecture of Philippe Starck. Academy Editions. ISBN 9781854903785.
- Morozzi, Cristina (2011). Philippe Stark. 24 ore cultura. ISBN 9788866480303.
- Riewoldt, Otto (2006). New Hotel Design. Laurence King Publishing. pp. 18, 28 and 44. ISBN 9781856694797.
- Vanderpooten, Gilles (2012). Impression d'ailleurs (in French). Éditions de l'Aube. ISBN 978-2815905176.
- Morozzi, Cristina (2012). Philippe Starck: Minimum Design. Ore Cultura Srl. ISBN 978-8866480303.
- Starck, Philippe (2010). Starck. Taschen. ISBN 9783836521086.
- Carmel-Arthur, Judith (2023). Design Monograph: Starck. Headline. ISBN 9781838611248.
- Fornasetti, Barnaba (2025). Fornasetti: Memories of the Future. Rizzoli. ISBN 978-8891841360.
- Starck, Philippe (2025). La vie minutieuse de Manfred Heler. ALLARY. ISBN 978-2370735324.
