= Christophe Coppens =

Belgian artist, designer and opera director

- Born: 21 November 1969 (age 56)
- Website: christophecoppens.com

Christophe Coppens (born 21 November 1969) is a Belgian artist, designer and opera director. Trained initially as a theatre director, Coppens started his own label as an accessories designer at the age of 21, a career that would span over 20 years with several outlets, international press following and buyers the world over, and that he would combine and nurture with his first stunts and solo shows as an artist.

== History ==
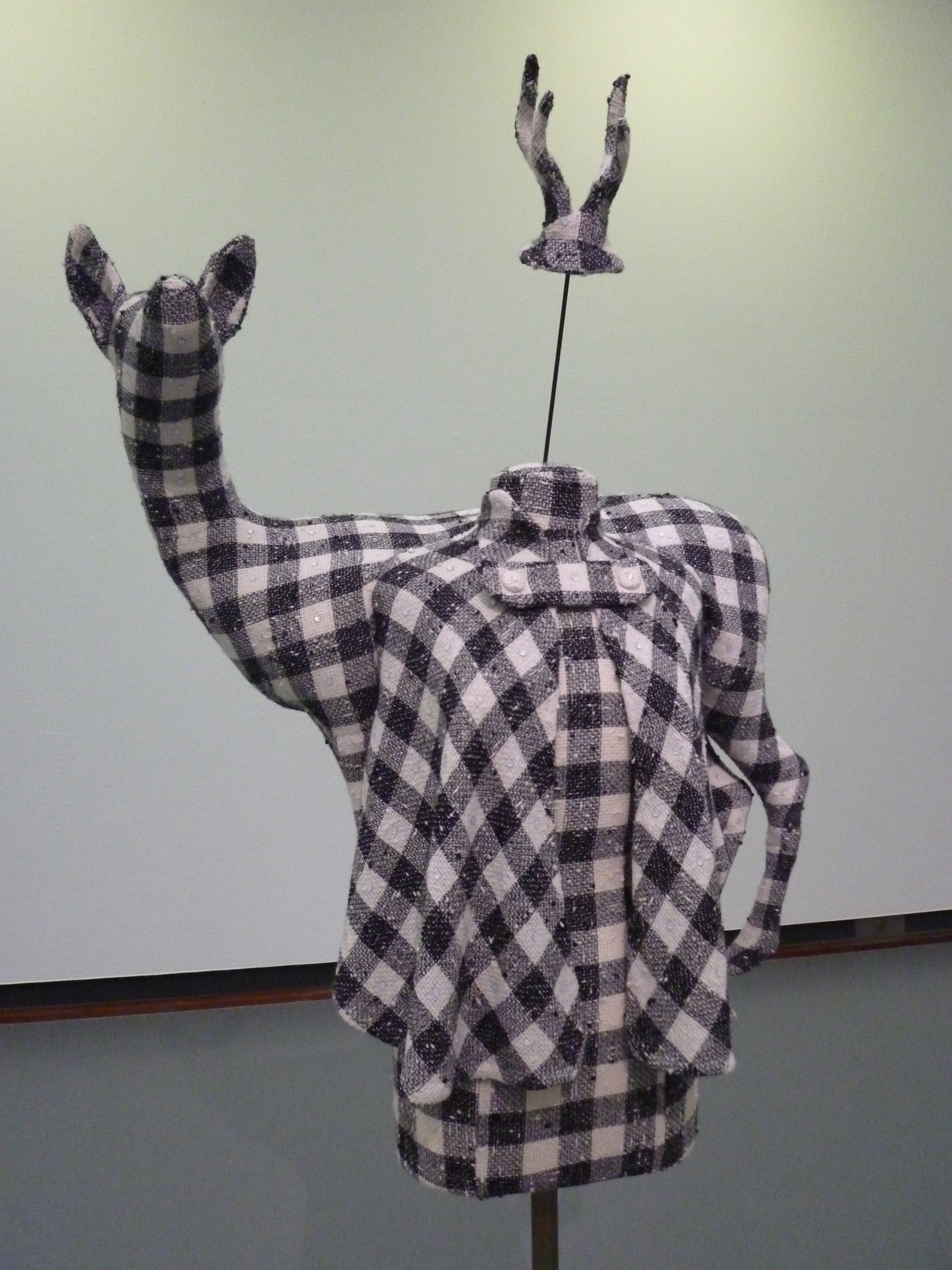
Deer Cape & hat, from Coppens's haute couture collection 'Dream Your Dream', Winter 2005

Coppens created his first experimental hat collection in 1990 which was picked up from the start by international buyers and press. Through the years his activities extended to complete accessories collections for men and women and opening outlets in Antwerp, Bruges and Brussels. He would also present his collections twice a year during Paris and Japan Fashion Week. Alongside he worked on collaborations for the fashion shows of international renowned designers making hats for the likes of Issey Miyake, Guy Laroche, JuunJ and Manish Arora, and he created one of a kind presentations for high-end world class retailers Charivay (New York City), Frank et Fils (Paris) and Joyce Boutique (Hong Kong and Paris), among others. In Japan he found distribution and representation in fashion group HP France.

In addition Coppens has made accessories for pop stars such as Rihanna, Grace Jones, Scissor Sisters and Beth Ditto, and he has worked most closely with Róisín Murphy, particularly on all the costumes worn by the performer during her 2008/09 Overpowered world tour. Coppens presented his first couture accessories collection in 2006 during Paris haute couture Fashion Week, displaying spectacular theatrical skills and the surreal undertone that has become his signature style since the early beginnings. That same year HP France opened his first shop in Tokyo, and he presented his couture collection during Japan Fashion Week.

In 2010 he was named Royal Warrant Holder in Belgium, recognition that came after more than 15 years making accessories for the Belgian royal family. At the end of 2011, to celebrate his 20th anniversary as a milliner and artist, Coppens opened an exhibition to show and auction some of his most outstanding couture pieces and artworks, hosted by Pierre Bergé & Associates in Brussels. In early 2012, following this event, he launched a retrospective book Homework encompassing these pieces and other highlights of his career. The book was listed among The New York Times' "Summer's 2012 must-reads".

In 2012, after 21 years, decided Coppens to close his company to focus exclusively on his work as an artist. At this point his label was sold in 140 shops worldwide and he was well known among fashion connoisseurs. He had become arguably one of the most celebrated milliners in Japan.

Coppens expressed his view on this transition in the exhibition "Everything Is Local: Landscape 1" at the prestigious Museum Boijmans Van Beuningen in Rotterdam. The show is a journey through the first six months following this violent break, how to deal with loss, letting go of the past and looking at the future.

In 2015 Coppens was appointed head of a new Master Program at the Sandberg Instituut, Amsterdam. That same year he designed the costumes for Pascal Dusapin's opera To Be Sung at De Munt, Brussels. and also designed 15 new masks for Róisín Murphy's world tour. In March 2017 Coppens returned to the theatre and directed his first opera at De Munt/La Monnaie in Brussels, Janáček's Foxie! The Cunning Little Vixen.

In 2018 he directed Bartok's Bluebeard's Castle and The Miraculous Mandarin at De Munt/La Monnaie, Norma in 2021. At Noord Nederlands Toneel CC directed Dorian, a new play written by Javier Barcala based on the Oscar Wilde novel "The Picture Of Dorian Gray".

In 2023 he directed Bellini's Norma at De Munt/La Monnaie.

In 2024 he directed Puccini's Turandot at De Munt/La Monnaie in Brussels. In 2025 the revival of Norma in the same house.

From 2013 till 2017 he lived and worked in Los Angeles. From 2017 till 2019 in Madrid. In October 2019 he moved back to Belgium.

== Art exhibitions ==
=== Solo shows ===
- 2001 – The Dollhouse – Museum Charlier Brussels, Belgium
- 2002 – The Dollhouse II: Life Goes On – Brakke Grond Amsterdam, Netherlands
- 2003 – The Dollhouse III: Return to the Dollhouse – Z33 Hasselt, Belgium
- 2005 – Dream Your Dream – Yoyogi Stadium Tokyo, Japan
- 2006 – Dream Your Dream II – Gallery Joyce Paris, France
- 2008 – No References – Platform 21 Amsterdam, Netherlands
- 2011 – Barbra – Highlight Gallery San Francisco, USA
- 2011 – CC 20 years – Pierre Bergé Auction House Brussels, Belgium
- 2013 – The Hills Are Alive : Landscape 2 – Tokyo, Japan
- 2013 – Everything is Local : Landscape 1 – Museum Boijmans Van Beuningen Rotterdam, Netherlands
- 2014 – Early Paintings HPGallery NYC, USA
- 2015 – Works On Paper Stephane Simoens Gallery Knokke, Belgium
- 2016 – 50 Masks Made In America at Please Do Not Enter Gallery Los Angeles, USA
- 2016 – The Treasure at Joyce Gallery, Hongkong
- 2019 – ESWC in Huis De Uil, Temse, Belgium
- 2021 - A Lovely Little Shitshow, Zwart Huis Gallery, Brussels, Belgium
- 2023 - Playdate, Zwart Huis Gallery, Brussels, Belgium
- 2025 - Squeaky Toys Have Feelings Too - Squeaky Toys Don't Get The Blues - Squeaky Toys Are Humans Too, Zwart Huis Gallery, Brussels, Belgium

=== Group exhibitions ===
- 2009 – The Art Of Fashion – Boijmans Van Beuningen Rotterdam, Netherlands
- 2011 – ARRRGH Monsters in Fashion – Athens, Greece
- 2011 – The Art Of Fashion – Wolfsburg Museum, Germany
- 2014 – The Future Of Fashion Is Now - Boijmans Van Beuningen Rotterdam, Netherlands
- 2020 - Kette und Schuss - CC De Binder Puurs, Belgium
- 2021 - Belgicart - Stichting Ijsberg Damme, Belgium
- 2021 - Look! - Marta Museum Herford, Germany
- 2021 - Kunstenfestival Damme, Belgium
- 2021 - The 10 Kids Trail - KMSKA Antwerp, Belgium
- 2024 - Gideon Invites - Home Before Dark / De Uitstalling / Zwartberg, Belgium/ March - June 2024
- 2024 - Les Liaisons Désireuses - Kasteel d-Ursel / Hingene, Belgium/ May - October 2024

== Opera ==
- 2017 The Cunning Little Vixen|Foxie!- Leoš Janáček at De Munt/La Monnaie in Brussels
- 2018 Bluebeard's Castle - Béla Bartók at De Munt/La Monnaie in Brussels
- 2018 The Miraculous Mandarin - Béla Bartók at De Munt/La Monnaie in Brussels
- 2021 Norma - Vincenzo Bellini at De Munt/La Monnaie in Brussels
- 2024 Turandot - Giacomo Puccini at De Munt/La Monnaie in Brussels
- 2025 Norma Revival - Vincenzo Bellini at De Munt/La Monnaie in Brussels

== Books ==
- Home Work published by Lido ISBN 9789491301087
- No References published by d'jonge Hond ISBN 9789089100634
- Fashion and Accessories published by Artez/Terra ISBN 9789058976772
- Not a Toy published by Pictoplasma Berlin ISBN 9783942245029
- Werken met woorden published by Ludion ISBN 9789055448197
- Art & Fashion published by Kerber Art ISBN 9783866785380
- The Art of Fashion published by Bojmans Van Beuningen ISBN 9789069182407
