= Dror Benshetrit =

Israeli designer

- דרור בן שטרית
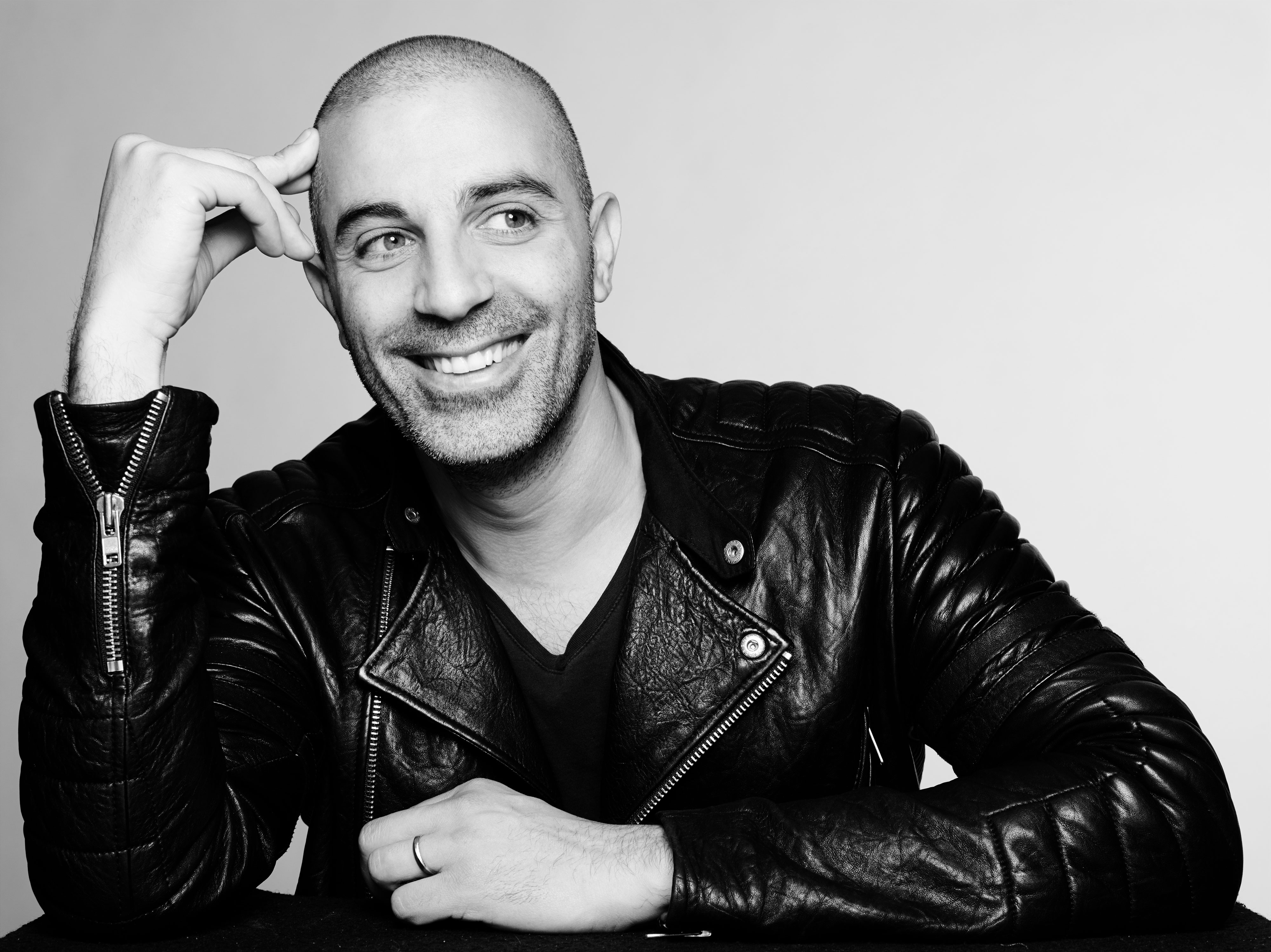
- Born: Tel Aviv, Israel
- Occupation: Designer
- Years active: 2002–present
- Board member of: Museum of Arts and Design (New York)
- Spouse: Davina Benshetrit
- Website: studiodror.com

Dror Benshetrit (Hebrew: דרור בן שטרית) is an Israeli designer based in New York City and Miami. He established Studio Dror, a design practice, in New York in 2002. The studio has worked on projects across product design, interiors, installations, and architecture.

His design for the Cappellini Peacock Chair is part of the permanent collection at the Metropolitan Museum of Art. Another project is the structural support system Quadror, though details on its applications and independent reception require citation.

In the mid-2000s, Studio Dror contributed a residential masterplan for Nurai Island off the coast of Abu Dhabi, which included a series of beachfront villas. He was involved in the Galataport masterplan in Istanbul.

In 2018, Benshetrit launched Super Nature Labs, a project aimed at rethinking urbanism and ecological design systems.

== Early life ==
Benshetrit was born in Tel Aviv, Israel and studied the work of Isamu Noguchi, Achille Castiglioni, and Buckminster Fuller. At age 25, he moved to New York City and opened his studio.

== Works ==
=== Vase of Phases (2005) ===
The Vase of Phases was Dror's first commercial product. Manufactured by Rosenthal, it is described as representing a vase at the moment of shattering and reassembly. It is part of the permanent collections at the State Museum for Applied Arts in Munich, the Eretz Israel Museum in Tel Aviv, and the Museum of Arts and Design in New York.

=== QuaDror (2006) ===
Dror developed a structural support system called QuaDror, which is patented. The system consists of interlocking L-shaped pieces that are stackable, load-bearing, and adaptable to different conditions, scales, and configurations. It has been used in multiple projects by the studio.

=== Swarovski (2007) ===
One application of QuaDror was in a partnership with Swarovski for a floor chandelier. The piece features a QuaDror frame with Swarovski crystal strands and opens into two parabolas of crystals, intended to stand on the floor.

=== Nurai (2008) ===
The masterplan for Nurai, an island off the coast of Abu Dhabi, includes twelve water villas and twenty-four land villas. The design includes roofs covered with vegetation. According to the designer, this approach was intended to provide privacy while maintaining community spaces.

=== Materialise (2009) ===
Through a collaboration with the Belgian 3D printing company Materialise, Dror manufactured and tested the QuaDror structure. The collaboration resulted in a kinetic cube called Volume.MGX, created from 1,200 laser-cut QuaDror structures. The assembled cube can expand to accommodate a light source at its center.

=== Peacock Chair (2009) ===
Dror designed the Peacock Chair, manufactured by Italian furniture brand Cappellini. The chair is constructed of three layers of felt folded and held in place with a metal frame. It appeared the music video for "S&M" by Rihanna.

=== Tron Chair (2010) ===
The Tron Chair, designed by Dror and manufactured by Cappellini, is inspired by the Tron: Legacy film and influenced by the angular terrain depicted in the film.

=== Havvada (2012) ===
Using dirt excavated for a canal between the Black Sea and the Sea of Marmara in Turkey, Dror proposed building a man-made island off the coast of Istanbul. Named Havaada, the conceptual island design features six dome-shaped hills surrounding an inverted mound at its center. The proposal includes a 3D urban grid with domes wrapped by residences. Each dome is intended to house a different activity center, connected by cable cars and walkways to each other and to a downtown center. The concept was described by the designer as addressing social, environmental, and economic issues in contemporary cities.

=== TUMI (2012) ===
In 2012, Dror collaborated with Tumi to create a collection of travel bags which included an expandable carry-on suitcase functioning as a backpack. Dror later collaborated with Tumi to redesign their retail experience. The design for the flagship store on Madison Avenue in New York City has been implemented in over 50 locations worldwide.

=== Brancott Estate (2017) ===
Dror designed a sculptural installation for the New Zealand-based Brancott Estate, a winery established in 1975. The installation uses the QuaDror modular system to form a geometric shape reflecting the form of grapevines. The design reflects the uniformity of the Marlborough landscape. Dror also created a scaled-down version of the installation functioning as a wine rack.

=== Galataport Masterplan (2018) ===
The team of Dror and Gensler won a competition to redesign Galataport, a site on the Bosphorus in Istanbul. The proposal included an underground cruise-ship terminal. The team developed a 3.5 meter hydraulic boardwalk and gangway system that opens when a ship docks. Above ground, the proposal included a multi-layered pedestrian neighborhood with mixed-use buildings connecting the city and sea.

== Exhibitions ==
Selected exhibitions:

- 2011 – Metropolitan Museum of Art: Peacock Chair
- 2011 – Interni: QuaDror geometry
- 2014 – Museo Poldi Pezzoli Milan: Peacock Chair
- 2015 – Wanted Design: QuaDror furniture
- 2015 – Guggenheim Helsinki
- 2017 – Bozar Centre for Fine Arts: Volume.MGX

== Awards ==
Awards: Miami Lift Award

- 2013: Winner of Miami Landmark idea competition

Red Dot Award in Product Design

- 2010: QuaDror 03 table in mocha stained ash
- 2013: Dror for Tumi International Expandable Carry-On

Good Design Award

- 2008: Dror for Boffi +/- cabinet
- 2010: Dror for Alessi Try it Trivet

IF product design award.

- 2006: Dror for Rosenthal Vase of Phases

== Talks ==
Selected lectures:

- 2011: What Design Can Do
- 2011: Design Indaba
- 2013: India Design Forum
- 2014: PennDesign
- 2017: C2 Montreal
