= Hudson Hotel =

Hotel in Manhattan, New York

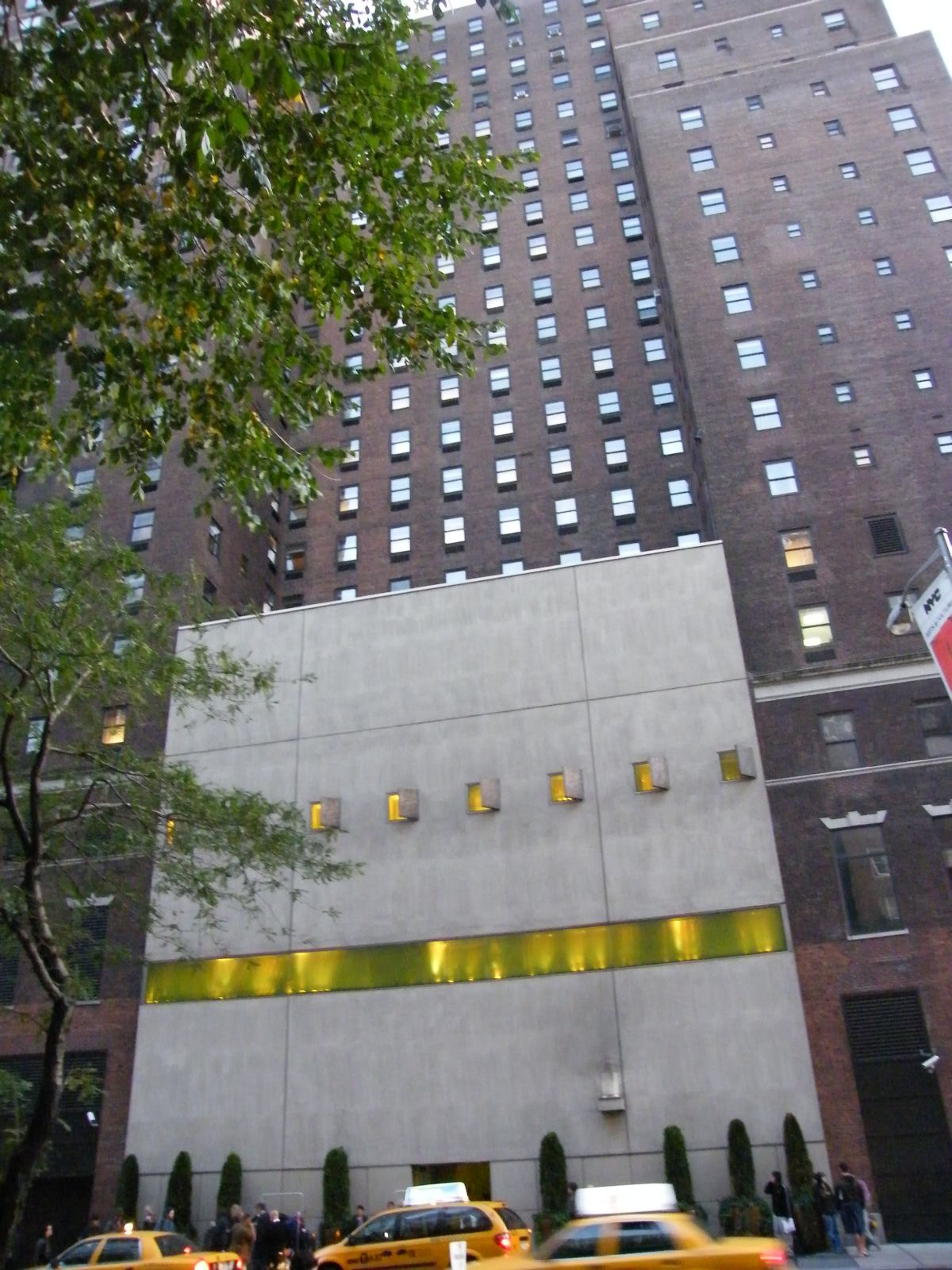
- Hudson Hotel
- Interactive map of the Hudson Hotel area

General information
- Location: Manhattan, New York City, US, 358 West 58th Street
- Coordinates: 40.768379°N 73.984954°W
- Opening: 1941
- Closed: November 19, 2020
- Owner: Montgomery Street Partners

The Hudson New York was a boutique hotel located along West 58th Street (at Ninth Avenue), in Hell's Kitchen, Manhattan, New York City. The hotel closed in November 2020 due to the COVID-19 pandemic. As of 2023 it was slated to be converted into 438 below-market apartments by a co-living firm.

In October 2025, the hotel filed for Chapter 11 bankruptcy protection.

== History ==
The Hudson New York was constructed in 1928 by Anne Morgan, daughter of J. P. Morgan, as the American Women's Association clubhouse and residence for young women in New York. It was completed in 1929. The building contained 1,250 rooms, along with a swimming pool, restaurant, gymnasium and music rooms along with a multitude of specialized meeting rooms. The American Women's Association went bankrupt in 1941 and the clubhouse building was converted into The Henry Hudson Hotel, open to both men and women. During World War II the building housed Dutch soldiers. More recently, until 1997 the second through ninth floors served as the headquarters for public television station WNET; the MacNeil/Lehrer NewsHour was broadcast from the building. WNET has since relocated to Lincoln Center.

In 1997, the building was purchased by Morgans Hotel Group and underwent a three-year renovation at the cost of $125 million. The hotel's name was changed from The Henry Hudson Hotel to The Hudson. As with the Royalton Hotel, the Hudson Hotel was also renovated by Ian Schrager, co-owner of Studio 54 and designer Philippe Starck.

When the Hudson opened it was the team's second hotel collaboration in New York, following the Paramount Hotel by 10 years. They made over the hotel to be relatively affordable but trendier, with the goal described as 'Cheap Chic'.

In compensation for the constraints of the private spaces, the designers decided to focus their efforts on creating large and dramatic public spaces. Hudson Bar, with its glowing yellow glass floor by Mison Concepts and ceiling fresco by Francesco Clemente, hosts events such as dance parties, movie premieres, book launches, and has been featured in several TV shows such as Gossip Girl and Sex and the City.
