= Morgans Hotel Group =

Hospitality company

- Type: Private 1984-2006; Publicly traded (NASDAQ: $MHG) February 14, 2006-November 30, 2016; Private 2016-2017
- Industry: Hospitality, real estate development, investments
- Founded: 1984; 42 years ago
- Defunct: 2017; 9 years ago
- Headquarters: 475 Tenth Avenue; New York City, NY, U.S.
- Area served: Worldwide (Doha, London, Istanbul, Los Angeles, Las Vegas, Miami, New York City, San Francisco)
- Key people: Ian Schrager; Chairman, Founder, and CEO (1984–2005); Jason Kalisman; Chairman & Interim Acting CEO (2013–2015), representing grandfather Alfred Taubman's interests Lance Armstrong; Board Member (2006); Sam Nazarian; CEO (2016–2017)
- Brands: Morgans Hotel; Royalton Hotel; Paramount Hotel; Delano South Beach; Mondrian Hotel; Hudson Hotel; Clift Hotel; Sanderson Hotel
- Owner: Ian Schrager (1984–2006); Alfred Taubman family (13%, until 2016); Ron Burkle (2009–2017); SBE Entertainment Group/Todd Boehly (2016–2017)
- Number of employees: 2000 (2006 IPO)
- Website: morganshotelgroup.com (defunct)

Morgans Hotel Group (NASDAQ: $MHG) was a global, publicly traded hospitality company founded by Ian Schrager and specialized in the boutique hotel category. Its foundations were laid in 1984 with the opening of the namesake Morgans Hotel in New York City. MHG was listed on the NASDAQ exchange for over a decade.

== History ==
=== 1984-2006: Ian Schrager's Morgans Hotel Group ===
In 1984, Studio 54 co-founders and business partners Ian Schrager and Steve Rubell opened their first hotel, Morgans Hotel, named after J. P. Morgan's Morgan Library & Museum next-door. Designed by Andrée Putman, the instant hit introduced the boutique hotel category, becoming a "worldwide phenomenon." It is characterized by its triple-arched entrances that remain today.

Following the success of Morgans Hotel, they opened the well-received Royalton Hotel and Paramount Hotel, both designed by Philippe Starck. With these properties, Schrager introduced "lobby socializing" where the hotel lobby became a new kind of gathering place for hotel guests and New York City residents alike, and "cheap chic" was affordable luxury offered in a stylish, sophisticated environment. Schrager is also credited with inventing the "urban resort" with his Delano Hotel in Miami and Mondrian Hotel in West Hollywood, also designed by Starck.

These were followed by the Hudson Hotel in New York, where he fully realized his concept "hotel as lifestyle", which he continued to refine, expanding to cities such as San Francisco with the Clift Hotel and London with the St. Martins Lane Hotel and the Sanderson Hotel, all designed by the prolific Starck.

==== NASDAQ: $MHG IPO ====
In June 2005, Schrager sold most of his stake in Morgans Hotel Group to launch the Ian Schrager Company. Despite stepping down as Chair and CEO, he retained $4 million in consultant pay and perks through end of 2007.

On Valentine's Day 2006, $MHG IPO'ed in a $360 million-target raise underwritten by Morgan Stanley, with Schrager cashing in his remaining 450,000 shares for another $9 million. Lance Armstrong served as a Board Member at IPO. Morgans Hotel Group was a publicly traded company on NASDAQ for over a decade.

=== 2013-2014: Ron Burkle vs. Alfred Taubman ===
2014 saw the end of a legal proxy war for MHG control between two billionaire interests:

- Yucaipa, the private equity firm of Ronald Burkle, who loaned MHG $75 million during the recession in 2009,
- vs. MHG Chairman and Interim Acting CEO, Jason Taubman Kalisman, representing 13% majority interest of an investment vehicle for his grandfather, Alfred Taubman, owner of Sotheby's and Short Hills Mall, among other real estate interests.

The two parties agreed to jointly seek a buyer, after all lingering legal proceedings with Burkle were settled. However, it had no permanent CEO to lead the company until 2016.

=== 2016-2017: Sam Nazarian's SBE Entertainment Group M&A ===
After years-long battle and board-rejected offers to buy MHG, Burkle partnered with Sam Nazarian's SBE Entertainment Group, who agreed to acquire MHG for $805 million, in a take-private transaction completed November 30, 2016.

Burkle converted his existing Morgans equity stake into a SBE ownership stake with a board seat. SBE also received investment from Cain, a global real estate investment company headed by Todd Boehly and Jonathan Goldstein. Nazarian retained majority ownership of SBE, remaining its Founder & CEO, leading day-to-day operations.

The merged company owned and/or operated over 20 hotels, including six properties under SBE's flagship SLS brand.

=== Since 2020: Accor ===
In November 2020, all of SBE Entertainment Group's hotel holdings were sold to Accor, after the latter already acquired a 50% stake in 2018. The majority of former MHG hotels is now being operated by Accor's lifestyle subsidiary Ennismore. A few of the former hotels however, including the Morgans Hotel itself, are now closed.

== Portfolio ==
As an independent company before M&A, MHG owned and managed 17 hotels in Doha, Istanbul, London, Los Angeles, Las Vegas, Miami Beach, New York and San Francisco comprising over 3,000 rooms. Each of its hotels was designed by a world−renowned designer:

=== New York ===
- Morgans Hotel - designed by Andrée Putman
- Royalton Hotel - designed by Philippe Starck
- Hudson Hotel - designed by Philippe Starck

=== South Beach ===
- Delano Hotel - designed by Philippe Starck
- Mondrian Hotel - designed by Marcel Wanders
- Shore Club Hotel

=== Los Angeles ===
- Mondrian Hotel - designed by Benjamin Noriega-Ortiz

=== Las Vegas ===
- Delano Las Vegas - rebranding of THEhotel at Mandalay Bay, in partnership with MGM Resorts International, later rebranded as W Las Vegas.

=== San Francisco ===
- Clift Hotel - designed by Philippe Starck

=== London ===
- St Martins Lane Hotel - designed by Philippe Starck
- Sanderson Hotel - designed by Philippe Starck
- Mondrian London at Sea Containers - designed by Tom Dixon

=== Doha ===
- Mondrian Doha

=== Istanbul ===
- 10 Karakoy A Morgans Original - designed by Sinan Kafadar
