= Morgans Hotel (disambiguation) =

Morgans Hotel is a boutique hotel located on Madison Avenue, New York City.

Morgans Hotel may also refer to:

- Morgans Hotel Group, a hospitality company that operates, owns, acquires and redevelops boutique hotels in the United States and Europe
- Morgans Hotel, Swansea, a boutique hotel in Swansea, not part of the Morgans Hotel Group
