= The Valorian Los Angeles =

Hotel in West Hollywood, California

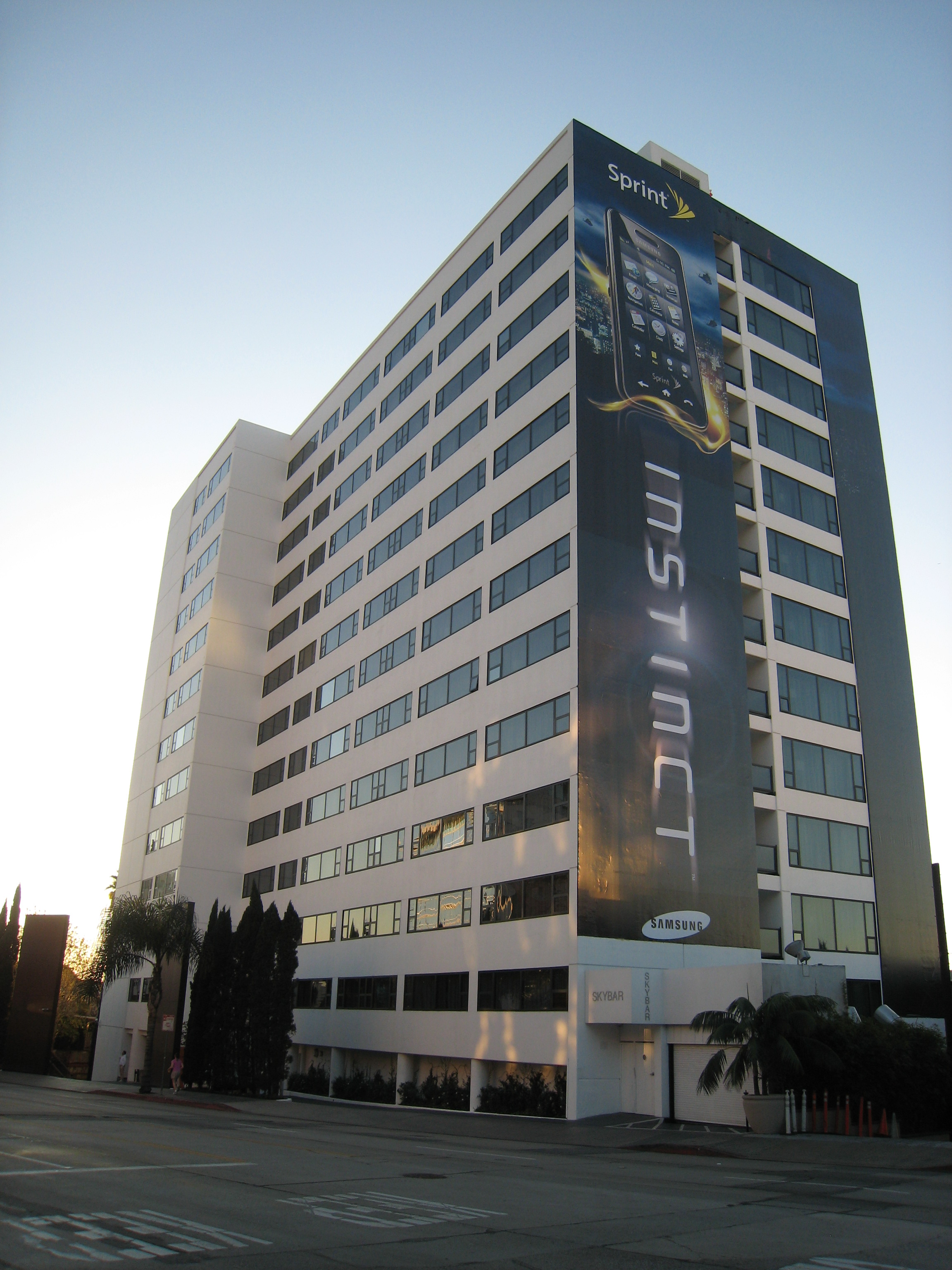
- Interactive map of the The Valorian Los Angeles area

General information
- Location: West Hollywood, California, 8440 Sunset Boulevard
- Coordinates: 34.09447°N 118.37435°W
- Opening: 1984
- Owner: Pebblebrook Hotel Trust
- Operator: Hilton Worldwide

Technical details
- Floor count: 12

Other information
- Number of rooms: 236

The Valorian Los Angeles (formerly Mondrian Los Angeles) is a boutique hotel at 8440 Sunset Boulevard in West Hollywood, California. It opened in 1984 and is owned by Pebblebrook Hotel Trust.

== History ==
The structure was built in 1959 as an apartment building. The Ashkenazy Group, owners of the L'Ermitage Hotel Group, renovated the building as a hotel to serve guests visiting Los Angeles for the 1984 Summer Olympics, it opened in July 1984, as Le Mondrian, named for Dutch painter Piet Mondrian. The hotel's nine-story exterior was covered by a commissioned work by Yaacov Agam entitled L'Hommage a Mondrian.

Le Mondrian was purchased by Ian Schrager and his Morgans Hotel Group in 1996 and renamed Mondrian Hotel Los Angeles. In 2008, Morgans Hotel Group commissioned designer Benjamin Noriega-Ortiz to update the hotel.

In April 2011, Morgans Hotel Group sold the Mondrian Los Angeles to Pebblebrook Hotel Trust for $137 million. Morgans Hotel Group continued to manage the hotel, under a 20-year agreement.

On November 30, 2016, Morgans Hotel Group, including the Mondrian Los Angeles, was acquired by SBE Entertainment Group for $805 million.

In November 2020, SBE Entertainment Group's hotel holdings were sold to Accor after Accor had already acquired a 50% stake in 2018. The Los Angeles property became the flagship of a worldwide Mondrian brand, managed by Accor's lifestyle subsidiary Ennismore.

On April 2, 2026, Hilton assumed management and the hotel was renamed The Valorian Los Angeles, Curio Collection by Hilton. The hotel is operated by operated by Pivot, the lifestyle operating group of Davidson Hospitality Group.

== In popular culture ==
Events

On December 4, 2007, rapper Pimp C was found dead in his room at the Mondrian Hotel in West Hollywood, California.

The wrap party of Star Trek: Deep Space Nine was held at the Mondrian in 1999. Images of the party at the Mondrian can be seen in the season seven DVD of the series.

Films

Britney Spears's documentary Britney: For the Record (2008) was filmed at the Mondrian Hotel.

Literature

One of the main characters in William Gibson's novel Spook Country (2007) stays on business at the Mondrian while in Los Angeles.

Music

The hotel is featured in the video for "All Up 2 You" (2009), performed by Akon, Aventura, and Wisin & Yandel.

The lyrics to Dr. Dooom and Jacky Jasper's song "Neighbours Next Door" from First Come, First Served (1999) state: "Lookin' out your Mondrian Hotel window, like Elvis Presley coming down the elevator."

The lyrics to 50 Cent's song "Places to Go," from 8 Mile: Music from and Inspired by the Motion Picture (2002) reference the hotel: "Matter of fact you gotta send it to Sunset Blvd up in the Mondrian"

Television

Several episodes of the HBO series Entourage were filmed on-location at the Mondrian.

In the third installment of the Family Guy's Star Wars parody, "Episode VI It's a trap," about 16:11 into the episode, the character played by Angela thanks her audience for meeting her "in the lobby of the Mondrian," drawing a comparison between the Mondrian Miami lobby's futuristic design and the interior of a Star Wars spaceship.

== See also ==
- SkyBar
