= Royalton Hotel =

Hotel in Manhattan, New York

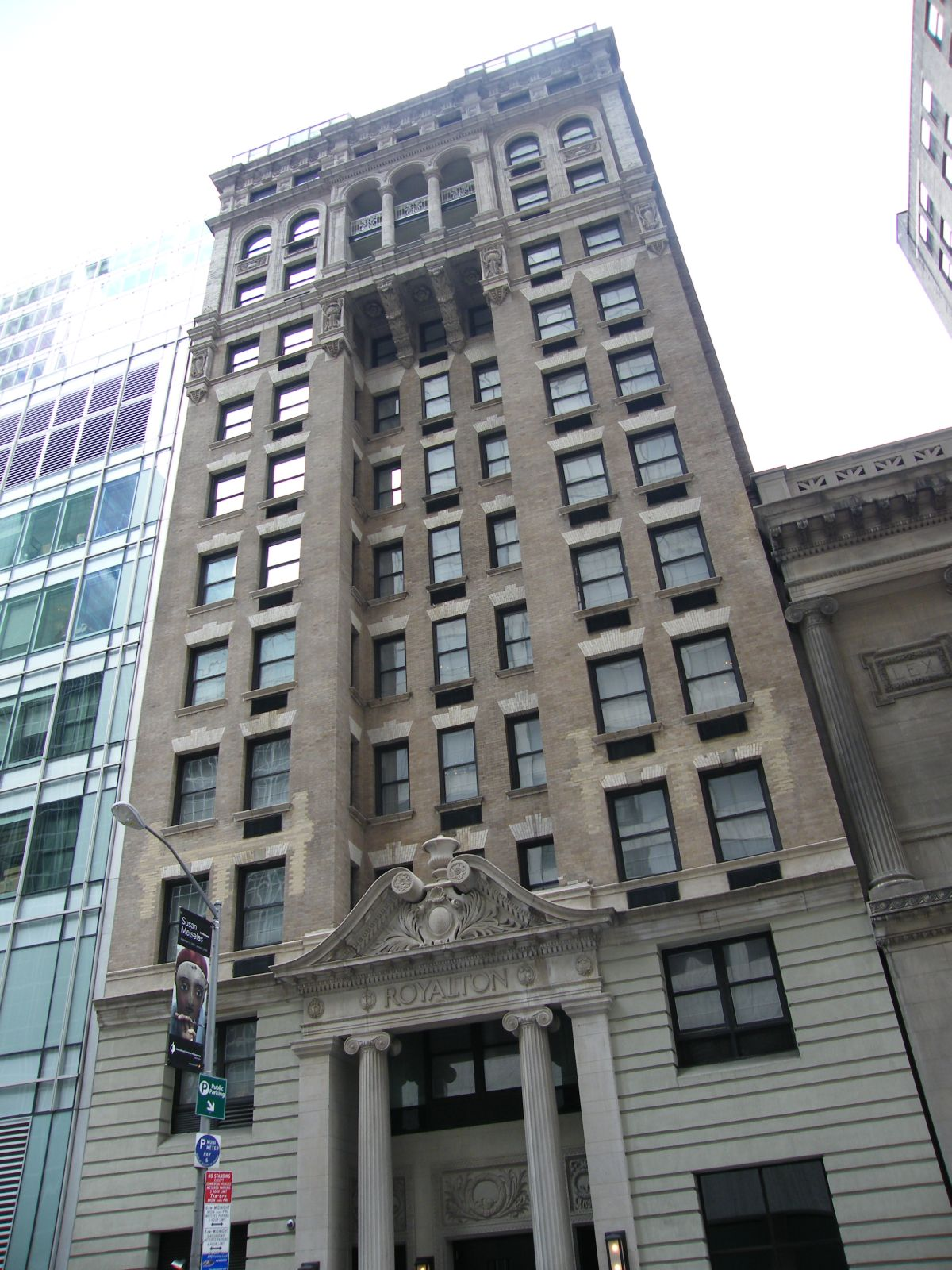
- Royalton Hotel

General information
- Location: 44 West 44th Street, Manhattan, New York City
- Coordinates: 40°45′20″N 73°58′56″W
- Opening: 1898
- Owner: MCR Hotels
- Operator: MCR Hotels

Technical details
- Floor count: 13

Design and construction
- Architect: Rossiter & Wright
- Developer: Edward G. Bailey

Other information
- Number of rooms: 90 apartments in 1898, 205 rooms in 1988; 165 rooms as of 2017
- Number of suites: 3 Penthouse Suites

Website
- Royalton Hotel

The Royalton Hotel is a hotel at 44 West 44th Street in Midtown Manhattan, New York City, United States. The hotel, opened in 1898, was designed by architecture firm Rossiter & Wright and developed by civil engineer Edward G. Bailey. The 13-story building is made of brick, stone, terracotta, and iron. The hotel's lobby, which connects 43rd and 44th Streets, contains a bar and restaurant. The upper stories originally featured 90 apartments, but these were replaced with 205 guestrooms when Philippe Starck and Gruzen Samton Steinglass Architects converted the Royalton to a boutique hotel in the 1980s.

The hotel was originally a residential apartment hotel and was developed between 1897 and 1898. For most of the 20th century, the Royalton operated as an apartment hotel; due to its proximity to Times Square, the hotel housed many figures in the entertainment industry. A group including Philip Pilevsky, Arthur G. Cohen, Ian Schrager, and Steve Rubell bought the Royalton in 1985 and renovated it into a boutique hotel. The Royalton reopened in October 1988 and quickly became popular, with critics largely praising the new design. The Morgans Hotel Group (MHG) operated the Royalton for over two decades and renovated it again in 2007. FelCor Lodging Trust bought the hotel from MHG in 2011 and resold it to Highgate Holding and the Rockpoint Group in 2017. MCR Hotels bought the hotel in 2020.

== Site ==
The Royalton Hotel is on 44 West 44th Street, on the south sidewalk between Sixth Avenue and Fifth Avenue, in the Midtown Manhattan neighborhood of New York City. The rectangular land lot extends south to 43rd Street, where the hotel has an alternate address of 47–49 West 43rd Street. It covers 10,041 ft^{2} (932.8 m^{2}), with a frontage of 50 ft (15 m) on both 43rd and 44th Streets and a depth of 200.83 ft (61 m). For tax purposes, the property is designated as Manhattan Block 1259, Lot 11. On the same block, the New York City Bar Association Building is to the west, while the Penn Club of New York Building, the General Society of Mechanics and Tradesmen Building, the Century Association Building, and the Hotel Mansfield are to the east. Other nearby buildings include the New York Yacht Club Building and the Harvard Club of New York City building to the northeast; the Algonquin, Iroquois, and Sofitel New York hotels to the north; the Belasco Theatre to the northwest; and the Chatwal New York hotel and the Town Hall to the west.

The adjacent block of 44th Street is known as Club Row, which contains several clubhouses. When the hotel was developed in 1902, the area was filled with clubhouses, including those of the Harvard Club of New York City, Yale Club, New York Yacht Club, New York City Bar Association, and Century Association. Prior to the development of the Royalton Hotel, the neighborhood contained a slaughterhouse, stables for stagecoach horses, and a train yard for the elevated Sixth Avenue Line. There were historically many stagecoach stables on 43rd and 44th Streets between Fifth and Sixth Avenues, but only a few of these stables remained at the end of the 20th century. The Royalton is also one of six hotels on 44th Street between Fifth and Sixth Avenues, the largest concentration of hotels on a single block in New York City during the early 21st century.

== Architecture ==
The Royalton Hotel is 13 stories high. Rossiter & Wright designed the hotel, while E. F. Dodson & Company was the general contractor. It was made of brick, stone, terracotta, and iron. During the mid-1980s, Philippe Starck and Gruzen Samton Steinglass Architects renovated the hotel, and Brian McNally designed two ground-level restaurants. The hotel was redecorated with gray-green slate, dark green marble, carved aluminum, and mahogany. The modern lobby dates to a 2007 renovation by Robin Standefer and Stephen Alesch of Roman and Williams.

When the hotel operated as an apartment hotel, the ground story was dedicated to public rooms such as restaurants and dining rooms; private meeting rooms; and club rooms such as reception rooms, reading rooms, and parlors. The remainder of the hotel was rented out as bachelor apartments. In the 1980s, the interior was rearranged in a manner similar to a mansion, with public rooms on the lower stories and guestrooms on the upper stories.

=== Lobby ===
The lobby covers 10,000 ft^{2} (930 m^{2}) and connects 43rd and 44th Streets. In the 1980s, the lobby was divided into several sections and was decorated with a blue carpet and mirrored walls. A short flight of stairs led down from street level. The lobby itself contained chairs in a variety of designs; glass-topped tables, some of which had chess boards; and decorations such as horse-shaped lamps. Some of the glass vases and tables were part of Starck's Etrangetes (Oddities) collection. The Royalton Grill and a stand-up bar were placed in the lobby, and there was also a 110-seat restaurant known as 44. Next to the lobby was a library with a 20-foot-long table, as well as a game room. Auxiliary spaces, such as restrooms and a check-in desk, were placed away from the main lobby; the men's restroom had an electrically activated waterfall. A 192 ft^{2} (17.8 m^{2}) circular bar, with blue velvet walls, was also next to the lobby; it was an allusion to the Algonquin Round Table at the neighboring Algonquin. The lobby's architectural features were removed in 2007. The modern lobby is decorated with dark metal and leather, as well as a gas fireplace.

=== Guestrooms ===
As originally designed, tenants had apartments overlooking 43rd or 44th Street, while servants lived in rooms overlooking the light courts along the sides of the building. Originally, the hotel had 90 units. The average apartment contained three rooms, which were unfurnished. Each apartment was serviced by a dedicated staff member, and there were 132 bathrooms on the upper stories. Each apartment was served by an ice machine in the basement. The hotel had 250 units by 1919, each of which had two or three rooms. By the 1980s, the hotel had 130 rooms.

In the mid-1980s, the corridors leading to the guestrooms were darkened for dramatic effect; as Starck explained, "before the opera starts, the place is dark." The corridors contained dark-blue walls, as well as blue carpets designed by Starck's wife. The fourth floor contained a small fitness center.

Following the 1980s renovation, the hotel had 205 rooms, which were arranged in 14 layouts. Generally, the rooms were decorated with "natural materials in neutral colors", including mahogany, gray carpets, and slate. Each of the rooms was decorated with gray-green slate, a material intentionally chosen to evoke Central Park. The rooms averaged 400 ft^{2} (37 m^{2}), and 40 rooms contained working fireplaces. The furniture in each guestroom was designed to resemble animal body parts, such as tails, snake heads, or horns. The mahogany bed frames and nightstands were designed to evoke ships. The furniture included blue armchairs, three-legged chairs, and mahogany-and-steel side tables. The walls had velvet banquettes, and each room had a chandelier with candles and a postcard that was changed twice daily; the postcard was the only art in each room. The bathrooms included features such as stainless steel sinks inset within glass counters, as well as mirrored walls, circular tubs, and glass shower curtains.

== History ==
=== Apartment hotel ===
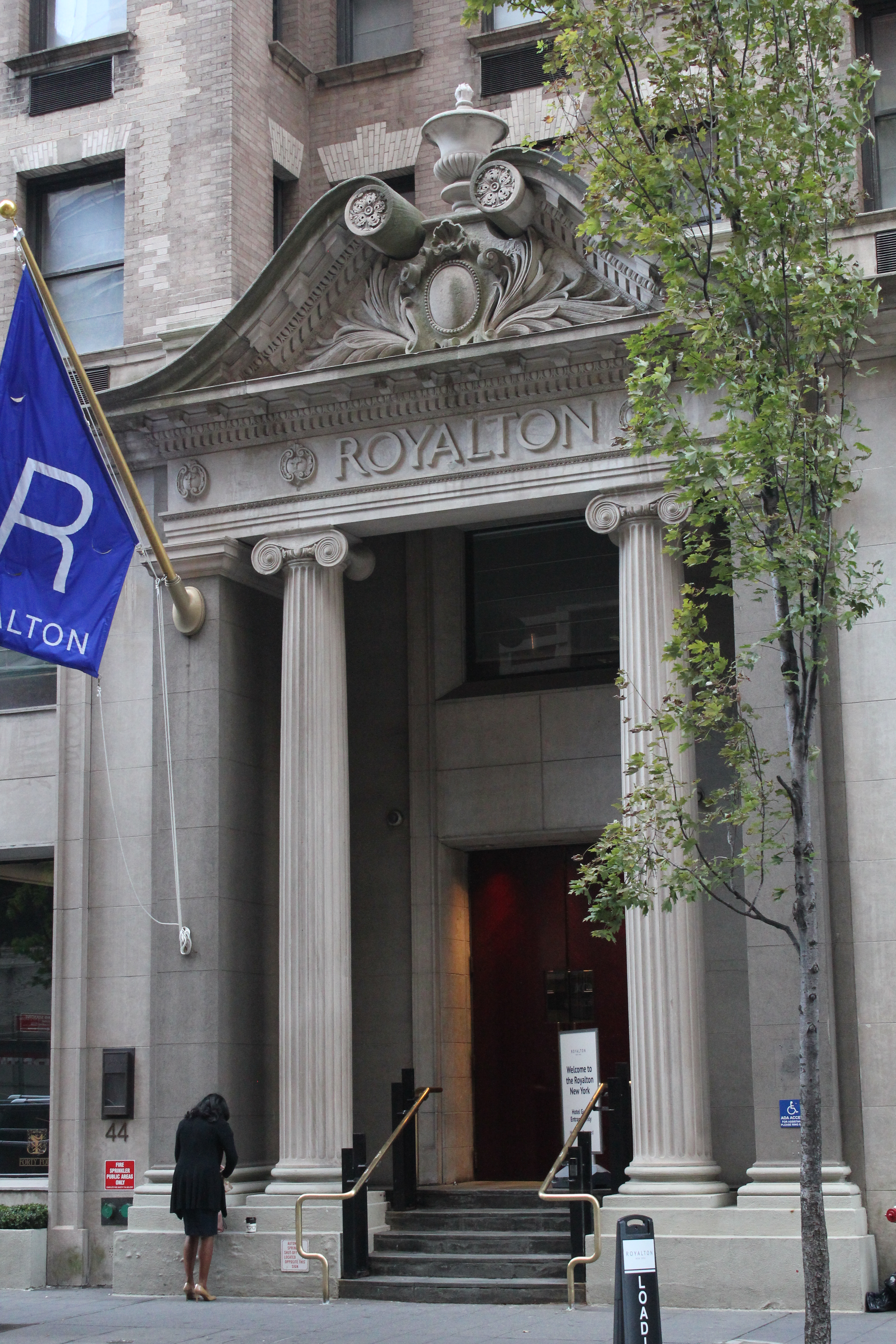
Hotel entrance

Civil engineer Edward G. Bailey developed the Royalton as an apartment hotel. Architecture firm Rossiter & Wright filed plans for a 12-story hotel at 44–46 West 44th Street in February 1897, at which point the hotel was expected to cost $500,000. In May 1897, C. F. Dodson & Co. received a general contract for the construction of the Royalton Hotel, between 43rd and 44th Streets. During the hotel's construction, that August, two hundred workers went on strike following a disagreement between ironworkers' and lathers' unions. The project, which cost $750,000, was funded by a $400,000 loan from the Mutual Life Insurance Company of New York. Soon after the hotel was completed in 1898, the Cornell University Club leased several rooms on the hotel's ground level, next to the lobby and billiards room. By 1900, the hotel contained two more clubhouses; the Penn Club occupied the northeastern corner of the Royalton, while the Yachtsman's Club leased five rooms at ground level. The Columbia University Club of New York also briefly occupied the hotel after its founding in 1900. Although apartments ranged from $50 to $200 a month (equivalent to between $1,935 and $7,740 in 2025), the Royalton was nearly fully occupied at the beginning of the 20th century.

Bailey sold the Royalton to the estate of Frederick Billings in September 1901, and the estate assumed the hotel's $675,000 mortgage. By the late 1900s and early 1910s, the surrounding neighborhood was rapidly developing into an entertainment district. The New York Hippodrome opened directly adjacent to the Royalton in 1905, and several Broadway theaters had been developed on 44th Street in the 1900s and 1910s. With the development of these attractions, the Royalton began serving theatrical guests as well. The hotel also hosted clubhouses in the early 1910s, such as that of Phi Gamma Delta. Joseph Shenk was negotiating to acquire the Royalton in November 1919, with the intention of converting the hotel into offices; at the time, the hotel collected $200,000 per year in rent. The planned conversion did not happen, and Quinlan and Leland placed a $550,000 first mortgage loan on the Royalton in 1927. The hotel contained a music store by 1930.

During the mid-20th century, the Royalton housed notable figures in the entertainment industry, leading the New York Daily News to describe the Royalton as the "poor man's Algonquin". Residents included actor Robert Benchley; actresses Lucy Beaumont, Muriel Starr, and Catherine Doucet; and theatrical critic George Jean Nathan. The hotel's tenants also included actor Marlon Brando and playwrights Noël Coward, Tennessee Williams, and Edward Peple. By the 1980s, the Royalton was a short-term budget hotel with 130 rooms. The hotel mainly attracted visitors with its low rates and its proximity to the Theater District.

=== Boutique hotel ===
==== 1980s and 1990s ====
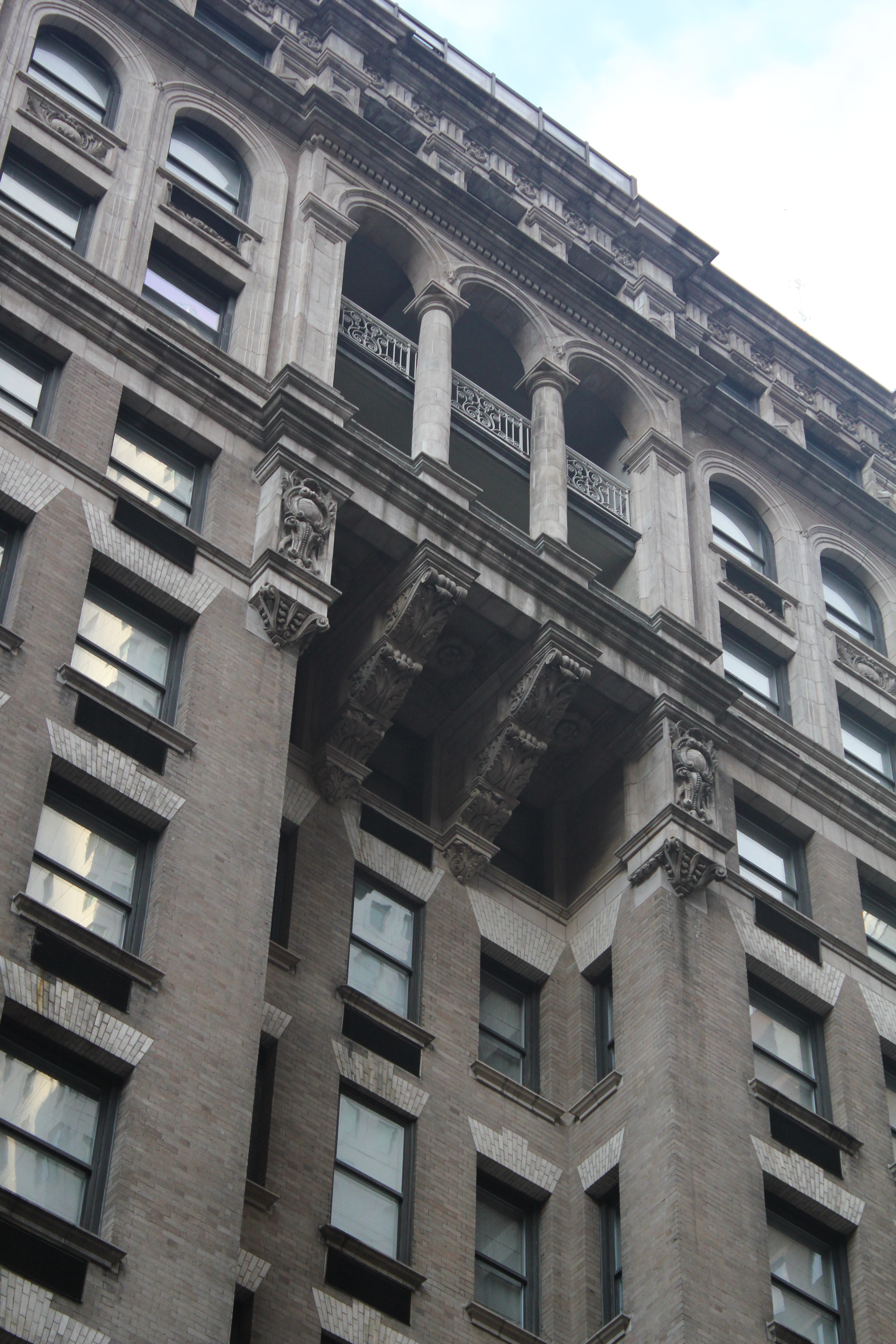
Windows on the upper stories

Philip Pilevsky was refurbishing the hotel by 1984; he considered 44th Street "one of the most prestigious streets in the city". Pilevsky jointly owned the hotel with Arthur G. Cohen, Ian Schrager, and Steve Rubell, who bought the hotel in 1985. At the time, several luxury hotels were being developed in Midtown Manhattan, and hundreds of hotel rooms were being built on Manhattan's West Side, which historically had much fewer hotel rooms than the East Side. The group hired Starck because he had little experience designing hotels, (Note: According to The Washington Post, Starck had previously designed a hotel in Beirut, which lasted less than a day, but lacked any other experience in hotel design.) and because of his "star status among international designers" at the time. The group was highly involved in the project: for instance, Schrager repainted a sample room 40 times before deciding on a paint color for each room. To hire staff for the hotel, Schrager ran advertisements in entertainment magazines such as Variety; this attracted 2,000 candidates, who auditioned for 178 jobs. The developers also had to work around a holdout tenant, a retired tap dancer in her 60s who refused to relocate because the hotel was near Broadway.

The Royalton reopened on October 10, 1988, after a $40 million renovation. The New York Times described the hotel's reopening as "one of the most-awaited design events of the year in Manhattan". At the time, nightly room rates averaged $190, while some suites cost more than $1,000 per night. Jeffrey Chodorow obtained the liquor license for the hotel's 100-seat restaurant, as Rubell and Schrager had been convicted of felonies and were thus banned from holding liquor licenses. Geoffrey Zakarian was hired as the executive chef of the Royalton's restaurant, 44. The hotel's ambience extended to the black uniforms that staff members wore. The hotel recorded between 85 and 100 percent occupancy in its first month. When Rubell died shortly afterward, Schrager continued to operate the hotel alone through the Morgans Hotel Group (MHG). Pilevsky considered selling the hotels that he had co-owned with Rubell and Schrager, including Morgans, the Royalton, and the Paramount. Although Schrager denied that his hotels were for sale, the Royalton's manager and controller had both resigned by early 1990. Nonetheless, Harper's Bazaar credited the three hotels with popularizing the boutique hotel industry.

The Royalton filed for bankruptcy protection in the early 1990s. The hotel had added a fitness center and 14 rooms by 1992. During that decade, the Royalton hosted guests including Madonna and Weird Al Yankovic, as well as Karl Lagerfeld, k.d. lang, and Wesley Snipes. The hotel's restaurant gained the nickname Club Conde because high-ranking Condé Nast journalists, such as Graydon Carter and Tina Brown, often ate at the hotel's restaurant; in particular, Carter hosted "noncommercial writers' lunches" at the Royalton until the 1990s. The restaurant scene was compared to that of the Algonquin Round Table, leading one writer to say the Algonquin as the "Royalton of the Twenties". The hotel itself gained a reputation for aloof staff, small rooms, and unconventional furniture, which added to its appeal with some guests. By 1994, the Royalton was the second most profitable hotel in the United States, behind the Lowell Hotel, as measured by sales per room.

==== 2000s to present ====
Schrager was planning to spend $12 million to renovate the hotel by mid-2001, amid a decline in demand for hotels in New York City. In addition, he planned to build 30,000 ft^{2} (2,800 m^{2}) of condominiums. After the September 11 attacks in 2001, Schrager used the Royalton to temporarily house displaced Lower Manhattan residents, and he had to drastically reduce nightly room rates. Schrager narrowly avoided defaulting on $355 million of debt in 2003; had Schrager gone into default, he would have been forced to surrender the Royalton and three other hotels to his lenders.

MHG continued to operate the Royalton after Schrager resigned as the company's chief executive in 2005. At the time, the hotel was appraised at $69 million. The new chief executive W. Edward Scheetz announced in June 2007 that the hotel would close for a full renovation. Roman and Williams spent four months redesigning the lobby, which Scheetz had described as dated. In addition, several rooms on the upper stories were combined into penthouse units, and the bar and restaurant were also renovated. The hotel reopened on October 23, 2007, following a $20.2 million renovation. MHG spent $1.5 million in 2010 to renovate the Brasserie 44 bar, and the company hired several bartenders to overhaul the cocktail menu. The bar reopened in October 2010 and was rebranded Forty-Four.

To pay off its increasing debts, Morgans announced in January 2011 that it would sell the Royalton and Morgans hotels. Texas-based hotel chain FelCor Lodging Trust agreed to buy the two hotels that May for a combined $140 million, though MHG continued to operate the hotels. FelCor announced in early 2016 that it was considering selling the Royalton, and Highgate and the Rockpoint Group bought the hotel in August 2017 for $55 million, taking out a $36 million mortgage to fund its purchase. At the time, the hotel had 168 rooms. The Royalton was temporarily closed in 2020 due to the COVID-19 pandemic in New York City, and it was sold again in September 2020 to MCR Investors, operator of the TWA Hotel, for $41 million. MCR planned to renovate the Royalton to make it less exclusive; the firm's chief executive Tyler Morse said that potential guests avoided the hotel since "it was too intimidating". In December 2023, LuxUrban signed a lease to operate the hotel.

== Critical reception ==
A decade after the hotel opened, the Nashville Tennessean described the Royalton as having "a quite amazing variety of private and dining rooms". Prior to the hotel's 1980s renovations, it was described as looking "so seedy that the shabby gentility of the worn and faded Algonquin, directly across 44th Street, seemed appealing by contrast".

When the hotel reopened in 1988, The Wall Street Journal wrote that the Royalton's "elongated lobby resembles a high-tech ocean liner", and that it was "obviously elegant, more obviously a hotel" compared with Morgans. A writer for the Hartford Courant said that "in form, the place is a modern design museum offering a virtuoso's show", although he also said that the Royalton had some practical shortcomings, such as the fact that the bathrooms were too small to fit two people. Newsday said in 1992 that the hotel "offers its own brand of trendiness" compared with the Paramount, while the Los Angeles Times said the hotel's design "would knock the socks off the cast of Star Trek". A writer for the Montreal Gazette stated: "I think it's supposed to appeal to English rock stars." Gruzen Samton Steinglass Architects and Starck both received 1991 Honor Awards from the American Institute of Architects (AIA) for their redesign of the hotel.

Critics also praised the lobby. Architect Robert A. M. Stern said that the lobby was "innovative, yet it's fun, and all the design precedents have been twisted and given a new look". USA Today wrote that "what [the Royalton has] brought back to New York is lobby socializing, a staple of the '20s society." A reviewer for The New York Times, writing in 2005, said: "If the bleeding edge is where your black-and-red Louis Vuitton yearns to rest, there are hotter spots than the slightly scuffed Royalton", although he said the hotel's ambience "never goes completely out of style". Two years later, Alice Rawsthorn wrote for the Times that Starck's lobby had been designed "as a metaphor for Manhattan, and the generations of immigrants who have settled there". The Times described the new lobby fireplace as "something Al Pacino might have in his Manhattan office in The Devil's Advocate." Interior Design magazine wrote: "Philippe Starck's handiwork, which lasted 19 years before workers began carting it away, may have been the most important hotel lobby of the late 20th century."

After the 2007 renovation, The New York Times said the hotel's restaurant was "anemic and empty" and wrote that, "if the Royalton was infamous for its gorgeous but bumbling staff, only the former part has changed". In 2007, the building was among the top 150 buildings in the United States ranked in the AIA's 2007 survey List of America's Favorite Architecture, receiving a higher rating than the original Pennsylvania Station.

== See also ==
- List of hotels in New York City
