= Ben Pundole =

- Occupation: Entrepreneur
- Known for: Editor-in-chief for A Hotel Life

Ben Pundole is an entrepreneur, hotel manager, and editor-in-chief for the online travel magazine AHotelLife.com. Pundole has been involved in the startup and development of many hotels and hotel chains, including Edition Hotels, Morgans Hotel Group, Ruschmeyers, Surf Lodge, and King & Grove. He is known for his work in the food and beverage, marketing, nightlife and events of boutique and lifestyle hotels, and has been featured in The New York Times.

== Career ==
The son of a caterer and a hotelier, Pundole began his career working at the Groucho Club at age 19. After working at the Groucho Club, he decided to forgo a formal college education and pursue a career in hospitality and hotel management. At the age of 22, he became the general manager of the Met Bar at the Metropolitan Hotel in London. While working at the Met Bar, he created a pop-up bar for Sak's Fifth Avenue during New York Fashion Week. He met Amy Sacco, the owner of Lot 61, at the pop-up bar. Sacco offered Pundole the position of general manager of Lot 61, and he moved to New York City at age 24 to manage the bar.

Pundole later worked closely with Ian Schrager before Schrager sold the majority of his hotels to the Morgans Hotel Group. He continued with the Morgans Hotel Group, where he served as the vice president of entertainment and oversaw the group's nightlife operations worldwide. In 2010, he, Rob McKinley and Ed Scheetz co-founded King & Grove Hotels, a boutique hotel brand with properties including Hotel Williamsburg and Hotel Chelsea. While working at King & Grove, Ben opened Ruschmeyer's in Montauk, New York, a boutique hotel that became a successful venue.

In 2012, Pundole left King & Grove to work with Ian Schrager and Edition Hotels, where he is the vice president of brand experience. In February 2013, Pundole founded the travel website AHotelLife.com, of which he serves as the editor-in-chief. The website reports on interesting hotels that provide a new perspective on hotel living.
