= Mark Fleischman =

American businessman (1940–2022)

- Born: Mark Harvey Fleischman; February 1, 1940; Manhattan, New York City, U.S.
- Died: July 13, 2022 (aged 82); Zürich, Switzerland
- Education: Great Neck High School; Cornell University School of Hotel Administration (1962)
- Occupations: Businessman, writer
- Known for: Studio 54 owner
- Spouse: Mimi Fleischman (1994–2022)

Mark Harvey Fleischman (February 1, 1940 – July 13, 2022) was an American businessman. He is best known for being the onetime owner of the Studio 54 nightclub.

== Early life ==
Fleischman was born on February 1, 1940, in Manhattan and raised in Great Neck, Long Island. His father, Martin, a Romanian-Jewish immigrant, worked as a furrier and hotelier, while his mother, Sylvia (Zausner) Fleischman, was a homemaker. At the age of 10, he visited the Copacabana nightclub in Manhattan with his parents, an experience that left a lasting impression on him.

After completing his studies at Great Neck High School, he graduated in 1962 from Cornell University's School of Hotel Administration. He then served for two years in the Navy, where he managed an officers' club. With financial support from his father in the form of a loan, he went on to purchase the Forest Hills Inn, a historic hotel in Queens dating back to the early 20th century.

== Career ==
In 1981, Fleischman bought Studio 54 from its original owners Steve Rubell and Ian Schrager. Later he opened and owned the nightclub Tatou. He also opened the short-lived nightclub Gaugin at the Plaza Hotel when it was owned by future U.S. President Donald Trump.

In 2017, Fleischman published his memoir about the famed disco he once owned, titled Inside Studio 54.

== Death ==
In June 2022, he announced he had decided to die by assisted suicide in Switzerland, after living since 2016 with an undiagnosed medical condition that affected his ability to speak and left him in a wheelchair.

Fleischman ended his life on July 13, 2022, with the aid of the assisted dying non-profit Dignitas. He was 82 years old.
