= Paramount Hotel =

Hotel in Manhattan, New York

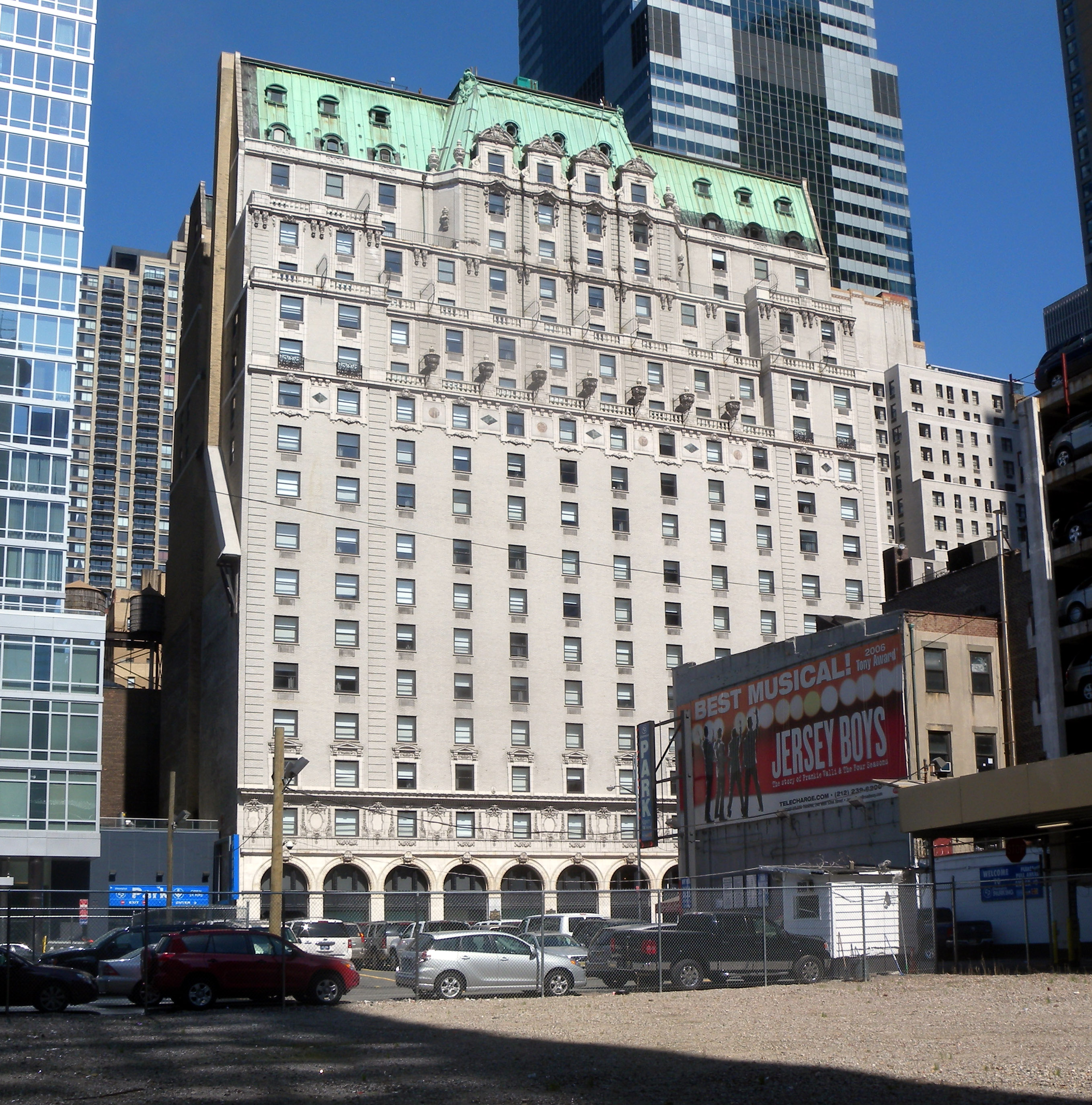

General information
- Location: 235 West 46th Street, Manhattan, New York, US
- Coordinates: 40°45′35″N 73°59′14″W
- Opening: June 12, 1928
- Owner: RFR Hotel Group

Technical details
- Floor count: 19

Design and construction
- Architect: Thomas W. Lamb
- Developer: Isidore Zimmer, Samuel Resnick, and Frank Locker

Other information
- Number of rooms: 597

Website
- www.nycparamount.com

New York City Landmark
- Designated: November 17, 2009
- Reference no.: 2342
- Designated entity: Facade

The Paramount Hotel (formerly the Century-Paramount Hotel) is a hotel in the Theater District of Midtown Manhattan in New York City, United States. Designed by architect Thomas W. Lamb, the hotel is at 235 West 46th Street, between Eighth Avenue and Broadway. The Paramount Hotel is owned by RFR Realty and contains 597 rooms. The hotel building, designed in a Renaissance style, is a New York City designated landmark.

The hotel is 19 stories tall and is H-shaped in arrangement, with light courts to the west and east. The north and south faces of the hotel contain numerous setbacks. The facade is made of brick, stone, and terracotta; most of the decorative detail is concentrated on the south facade, along 46th Street. The hotel building contains a double-height colonnade at street level, as well as several terraces above each of the setbacks. The building has a double-height hip roof flanked by mansard roofs. The basement contains an event venue named Sony Hall, which has historically been used as a nightclub and theater. The double-height lobby's design dates to a 1990 renovation by Philippe Starck.

Isidore Zimmer, Samuel Resnick, and Frank Locker developed the Hotel Paramount starting in 1927, and it opened on June 12, 1928. The property went into foreclosure shortly after its completion, and Chase National Bank took over in the 1930s. The Paramount became popular after Billy Rose's Diamond Horseshoe nightclub (now Sony Hall) opened in the basement in 1938. When the Diamond Horseshoe closed in 1951, the hotel began to decline, and the property was sold multiple times over the next few decades. The hotel was known as the Century-Paramount during the 1970s and 1980s. Philip Pilevsky and Arthur G. Cohen acquired the hotel in 1986, and Ian Schrager operated it for the next two decades. Starck renovated the hotel from 1988 to 1990, and several renovations have taken place since then. The hotel was sold in 2004 to Sol Melia Hotels and Resorts and Hard Rock Cafe, then in 2007 to Walton Street Capital. The hotel was sold to Aby Rosen's RFR Holding in 2011 and has been operated by management firm Generator since 2022.

== Site ==
The Paramount Hotel is at 235 West 46th Street, on the north sidewalk between Eighth Avenue and Broadway, near Times Square in the Theater District of Midtown Manhattan in New York City. The rectangular land lot covers 15,062 ft^{2} (1,399.3 m^{2}), with a frontage of 150 ft (46 m) on 46th Street and a depth of 100.42 ft (30.61 m). The property is in Manhattan Community District 5 and is designated as Block 1018, Lot 6 for tax purposes. The Paramount Hotel shares the block with the Lena Horne Theatre to the north and the Hotel Edison and Lunt-Fontanne Theatre to the east. Other nearby buildings include the Samuel J. Friedman Theatre to the north; the Ethel Barrymore Theatre, Longacre Theatre, and Morgan Stanley Building to the northeast; the Richard Rodgers Theatre and Music Box Theatre to the southeast; the Imperial Theatre to the south; and the off-Broadway 47th Street Theatre to the west.

The surrounding area is part of Manhattan's Theater District and contains many Broadway theaters. Prior to the Paramount Hotel's development in the 1920s, the site contained several low-rise buildings.

== Architecture ==
The Paramount Hotel was designed by Thomas W. Lamb and built by the O'Day Construction Company. It was one of Lamb's few non-theatrical buildings; most of his work consisted of over 300 theaters and cinemas. An early source characterized the hotel as being Italian Renaissance in design, but the hotel's own website and the New York City Landmarks Preservation Commission describe the building as being French Renaissance-inspired.

Due to the presence of a mezzanine level above the ground story, sources differ as to how many stories the hotel contains. While the New York City Landmarks Preservation Commission and SkyscraperPage give a figure of 19 stories (excluding the ground-story mezzanine), the New York City Department of City Planning cites the hotel as being 18 stories tall, and Emporis gives a figure of 20 stories. Originally, the hotel had 700 rooms.

=== Form ===
The hotel is H-shaped in arrangement. The northern and southern elevations are twelve bays wide, while the western and eastern elevations are narrower and have light courts at their centers. The northern elevation faces the center of the block, toward 47th Street, and the southern elevation faces 46th Street. The massing includes several setbacks at the 12th, 14th, 16th, and 18th stories. Because the setbacks are only placed on the northern and southern elevations of the facade, they are only visible from the west and east.

Along 46th Street, the first eleven stories occupy nearly the entire site (except for the light courts), extending outward to the lot line. The eight center bays on the 12th and 13th stories are recessed from the two end bays on either side. There is another setback across all twelve bays at the 14th story, though the center bays on the 14th and 15th stories are still recessed. Above the 16th story, the three outermost bays on each side are recessed significantly. Diagonal wall sections link the outermost bays with the four center bays, which continue straight up from the 14th-story setback. At the 18th and 19th stories, the outer bays on each side form a copper mansard roof with dormer windows, while the center bays are topped by a hip roof.

Along the north elevation (facing 47th Street), the lowest ten stories are obscured by neighboring buildings such as the Brooks Atkinson Theatre, though the 11th through 19th stories are visible from 47th Street. The setbacks on this elevation all span the width of the facade.

=== Facade ===
The facade is made of brick, stone, and terracotta. Most of the decorative detail is concentrated on the south elevation, facing 46th Street. The most ornate decorations are on the ground story, mezzanine, and 2nd story, since that is the most prominent portion of the facade from the street level. The other floors contain simpler decorative details.

==== Base ====
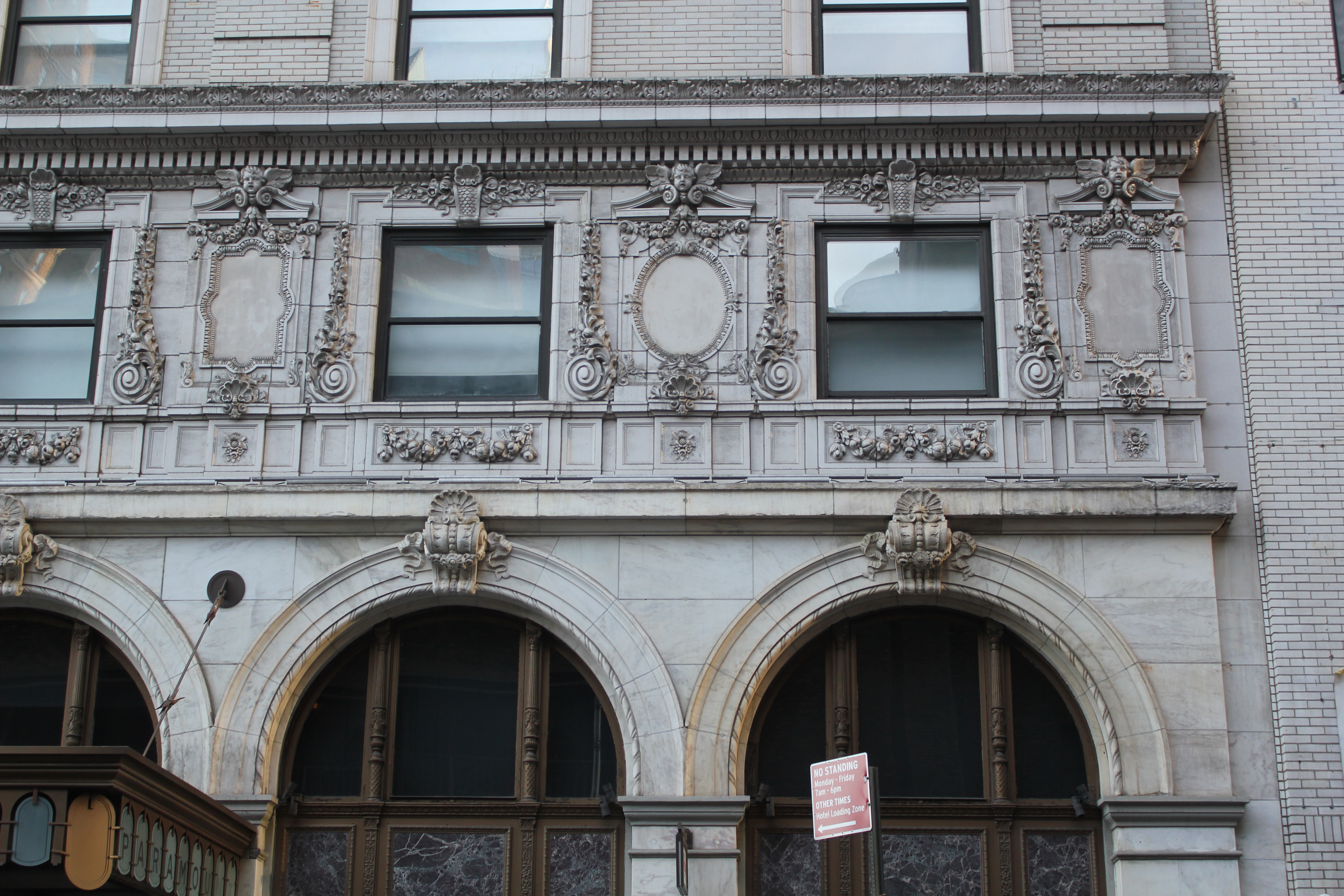
Detail of the mezzanine (bottom) and the second-story windows (top). The upper portion of each arch contains a tripartite iron frame. The second-story windows, above the arches, are rectangular sash windows surrounded by eared moldings. There are marble panels between each set of second-story windows.

At ground level, the 46th Street facade consists of a double-height colonnade with twelve round arches, spanning the width of the hotel. The arches are supported by white marble piers above a granite water table. Most of the ground-level openings contain storefront windows or doors. The third and fourth bays from the right contain the hotel's entrance, while the fifth bay from the left contains an entrance to Sony Hall. Two ornate marquees, one each in front of Sony Hall's and the hotel's entrances, were installed as part of a 2013 renovation. The piers on either side of the Sony Hall entrance contain bronze-framed sign boards. The upper portion of each arch contains a tripartite iron frame, which separates the cast-iron spandrels between the ground and mezzanine windows, as well as the mezzanine windows themselves. The tops of the arches are surrounded by moldings, and the keystone of each arch contains a volute with ribbons on either side. A marble string course runs above the first-story colonnade.

The 2nd-story windows are rectangular sash windows surrounded by eared moldings. All of the windows share a paneled window sill, which contains swags just beneath each window. There are volutes flanking each window, above which rise vertical bands of foliate decoration. The tops of each window contain keystones with shells and foliate swags. The windows are separated by marble panels that are alternatively round and rectangular, with ornate frames. The panels contain shells at their bottoms, as well as swags, curved pediments, and angels' heads above. A cornice runs above the 2nd story.

==== Upper stories ====
The 3rd through 10th stories are mostly clad in plain brick with rectangular window openings. The 3rd-story window openings are surrounded by eared moldings; above each window are volutes flanking swags, which support segmental-arched and triangular pediments. The 4th- through 10th-story windows are plain in design, except for window sills and air-conditioning vents below each window. Starting on the 3rd story, the two outer bays are flanked by narrow bands of brick quoins. The 11th-story windows contain eared moldings, swags below each window, and elaborate keystones. There are marble panels between most of the 11th-story windows (except in front of the quoins); the panels have alternating lozenge and circular shapes. Each of these marble panels is topped by three brackets shaped like acanthus leaves. A string course runs above the 11th story.

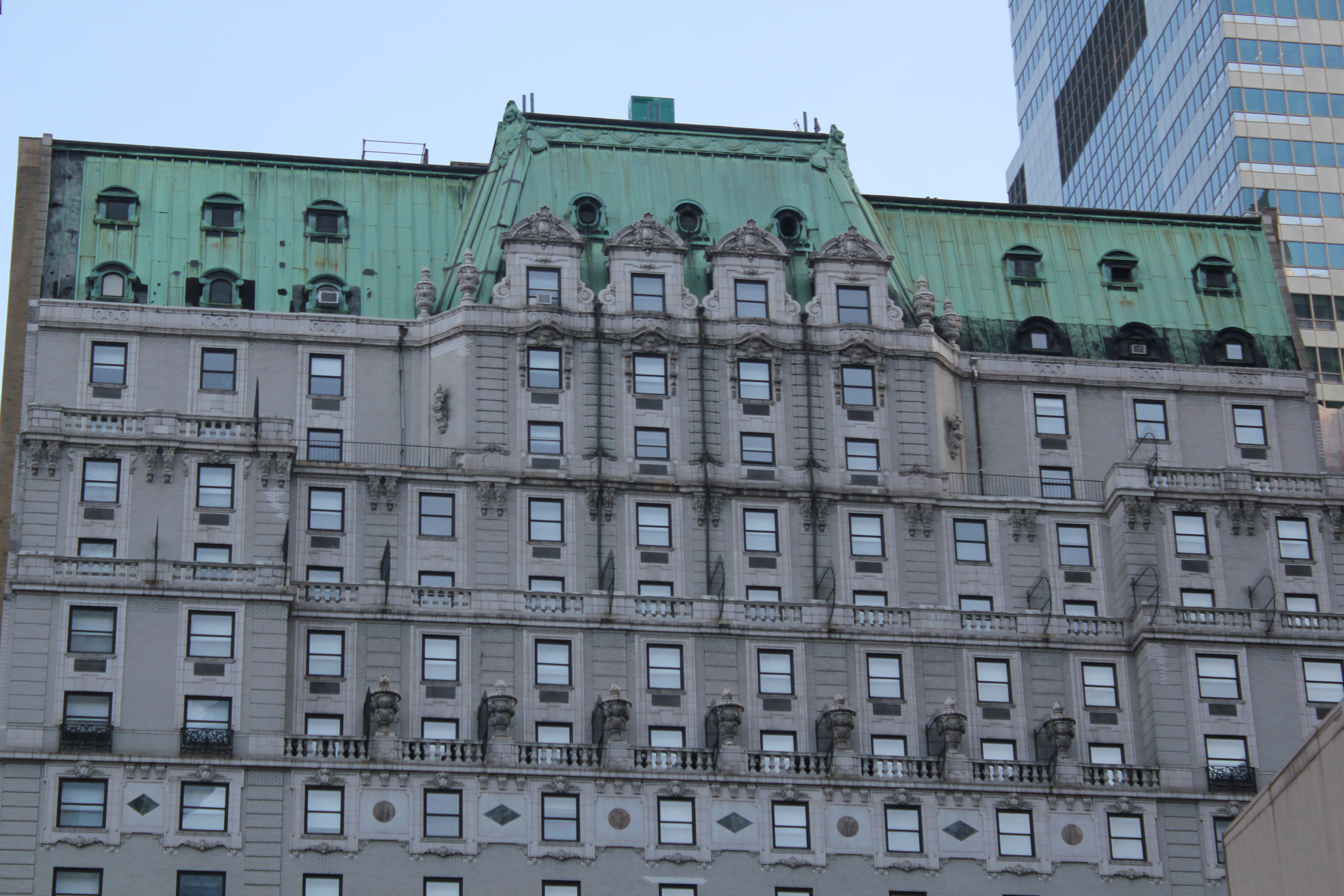
Facade of the Paramount Hotel above the 11th story. At the 12th-story setback, there is a terracotta balustrade in front of the eight center bays. There are further setbacks at the 14th, 16th, and 18th stories. Parts of the facade are separated vertically by iron railings and metal security grates.

At the 12th-story setback, there is a terracotta balustrade in front of the eight center bays. Each of these bays is separated by an urn with a terracotta finial. Metal security grates are installed between the facade and the urns, dividing the balcony into several sections. The four outer windows on the 12th story are filled with iron balustrades. At the 14th-story setback, there is a string course and a balustrade across all twelve bays; metal grates are installed at several points. Within each bay, the windows at the 12th and 13th stories are placed within the same terracotta molding, as are the 14th- and 15th-story windows in each bay. On each of the 12th through 15th stories, there are bands of quoins separating each of the bays, except for the two outermost bays on either side, which are separated by plain brick. Another cornice runs above the 15th story, supported by pairs of brackets and acanthus leaves.

At the 16th and 17th stories, the four central bays rise without setting back further. The three outermost bays on either side are significantly set back, creating the impression of a projecting central pavilion. The central bays and the outer bays are connected by diagonal wall sections, which are decorated with urns atop volutes. The two outermost bays on either side have stone balustrades, while the remainders of the outer pavilions contain iron railings and metal security grates. Within each bay, the windows at the 16th and 17th stories are placed within the same terracotta molding. Each of the four center bays is separated by a row of quoins. At the 17th story, the center bays have pediments decorated with cartouches and volutes. A terracotta frieze separates the 17th story from the roof.

The west and east elevations are generally designed in plain brick with rectangular window openings. The southern sections of these elevations contain chimneys above the 8th story, as well as stone bands at the 12th, 14th, 16th, and 18th-story setbacks. The north elevation contains terracotta balconies at each setback, which span the width of the facade. The setbacks also have metal security grates.

==== Roof ====
The hotel's southern and northern wings share a hip roof at the center, flanked by mansard roofs on either side of each wing. The central hip roof is topped by a frieze with ribbons and swags, with cartouches at the corners. A plain coping runs above the rest of the roof.

To the south, the hip-roofed section is flanked by two volutes on either side. The four center windows contain stone dormers at the 18th story; these are topped by arched pediments decorated with shells and foliate decorations. The center of the 19th story has three circular copper dormers with pediments, which alternate with the 18th-story windows. On the south elevation, the side bays each have three copper dormers on the 18th and 19th stories, with segmentally arched pediments. To the north, there are two square dormer windows at the 18th story.

=== Interior ===
==== Lobby ====
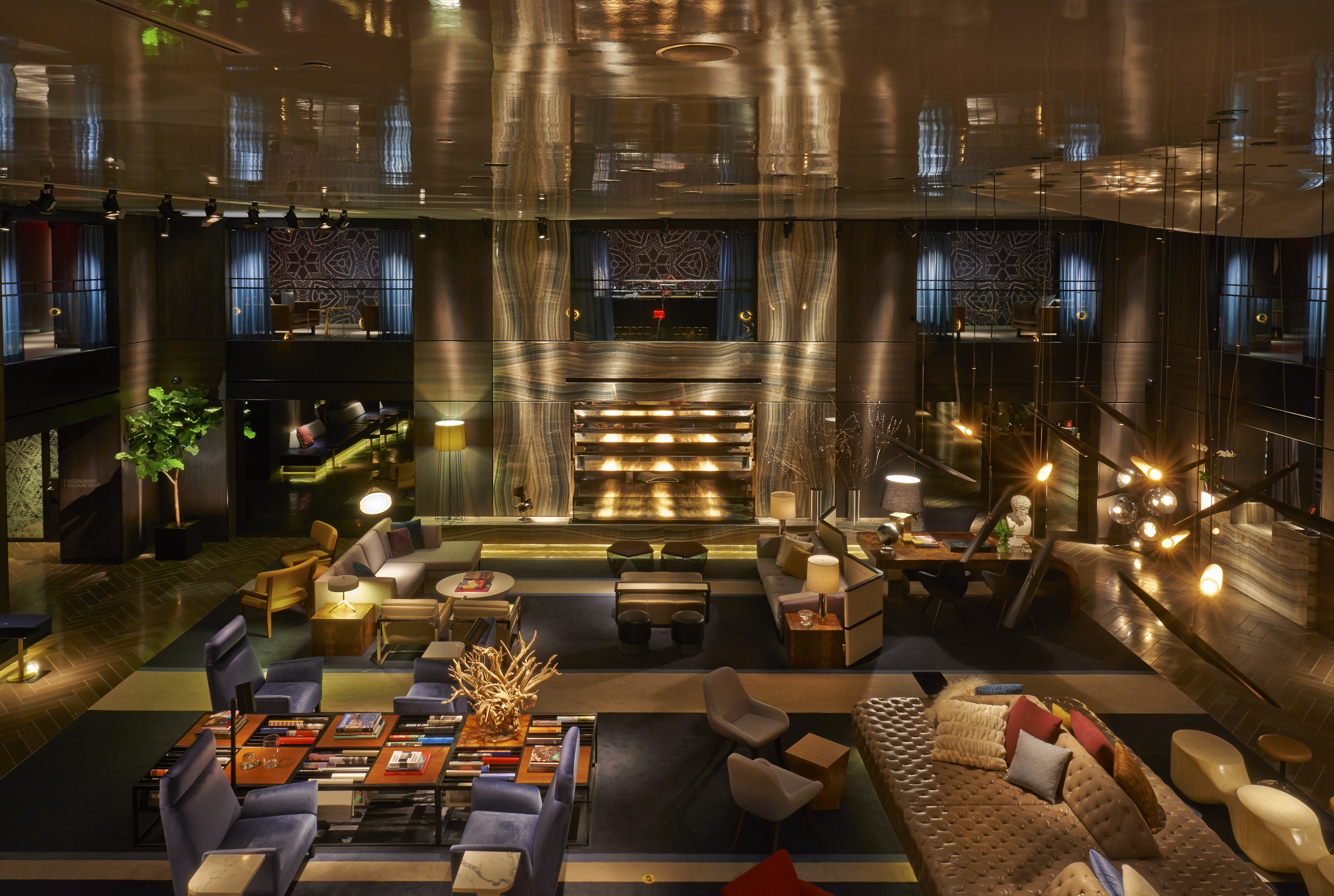
Lobby of the Paramount Hotel

The hotel's lobby was originally decorated in marble and contained art from Cornelius Vanderbilt's estate. The modern lobby design dates to a 1990 renovation by Philippe Starck, who drew inspiration from science-fiction themes and 19th-century ocean liners. The lobby is decorated with stucco, and the marble walls have niches decorated with roses, which enclose a newsstand, reception desk, cashier, and concierge. A 2,000 ft^{2} (190 m^{2}) white-gold-leaf panel is placed on one wall. There is also furniture in various designs, as well as a carpeted central seating area with sofas, chairs, and a checkerboard carpet. Furnishings by designers such as Marc Newson, Antoni Gaudí, and Jean-Michel Frank are also featured in the lobby. On the main level was also a brasserie operated by Dean & DeLuca, as well as a take-out restaurant. At the rear of the lobby was the Whiskey Bar, designed in a "semi-industrial" manner with Polaroids on the walls. One reviewer said of the lobby: "Despite its severe, concrete-like interiors, the lobby has something spunky about it."

The lobby also has a mezzanine spanning 2,000 square feet, which wraps around the ground-floor space. The ground and mezzanine levels are connected by a plexiglass-and-marble stairway, which is designed to give the impression that it is floating. After the renovation in 1990, the mezzanine level had a movie theater, a fitness center, and a business center. The lobby mezzanine also contained a playroom designed by Gary Panter, though the playroom has since been dismantled. Starck designed custom lamps for the mezzanine, which subsequently were sold commercially under the name "Miss Sissi". Restrooms, decorated with multicolored tiles, are also placed on this level. When the hotel was renovated, Pierre Sabatti redesigned the mezzanine restrooms with stainless-steel sinks, shaped like cones and decorated with etchings of leaves and feathers. A writer for Newsday characterized the mezzanine bathrooms as among New York City's ten best restrooms.

==== Sony Hall ====
When the hotel was completed, it contained an 850-seat grill room measuring 75 by 100 ft (23 by 30 m), with a 19 ft-high (5.8 m) ceiling and attached dressing rooms. In 1938, the room became a night club called Billy Rose's Diamond Horseshoe. The basement space then became a theater and was known by several names, including as the Stairway Theatre, Mayfair Theatre, and Century Theatre. Since 2018, the theater in the basement has operated as an event venue named Sony Hall.

Lamb's original design for the space was a nostalgic take on a saloon from the 1890s. The design was based on that of grill rooms and restaurants in Europe, with pink, blue, and white Celanese satin at the entrance. The current design dates to a renovation in 2013, carried out by architectural firm Stonehill & Taylor and interior designer Meg Sharpe, as most of the original design elements were too badly deteriorated to be restored. Sony Hall's entrance leads to a grand marble staircase, which has been distressed with scenic painting techniques. The main room's interior, is largely new construction but takes design cues from Lamb's original intent, such as lunettes and a frieze. The hall's ceiling is designed with multiple domes and trim framing out a center ellipse containing a fiber optic night sky. The walls are lined with antique faceted mirrors above curving banquette seating built in tiers with curving railings. Additional raised seating pods dot the space.

==== Other spaces ====
The hotel's original decorative features included bronze elevator doors in the Baroque style, as well as marble stairs with iron handrails. After the 1990 renovation, the elevators were refitted with multicolored lights in emerald, ruby, indigo, and amber colors. The elevator lobby was redecorated with mirrored walls, which one publication likened to a "funhouse".

After a 1990 renovation, the hotel was divided into 610 rooms, which include both single and double rooms. Most suites are small, measuring only 8 by 10 feet. Newsday compared the sizes of the suites to a "janitorial supply closet", and a reviewer from the Orlando Sentinel wrote that his single room "was very small, verging on confining". Each suite contained a reproduction of a Vermeer painting. The beds were designed with gold-colored headboards beneath the paintings. Other features of the design include conical sinks as well as "high-backed chairs with unusual curves". The hotel also has mirrors that can display weather forecasts. As of 2024, there are 597 rooms; the smallest room available is a 140-square-foot (13 m^{2}) studio.

== History ==
Times Square became the epicenter for large-scale theater productions between 1900 and the Great Depression. During the 1900s and 1910s, most theaters in the neighborhood were clustered around Broadway, but the boundaries of the Theater District expanded westward to Eighth Avenue after World War I. In the late 1920s, dense developments were constructed around Eighth Avenue in conjunction with the construction of the New York City Subway's Eighth Avenue Line.

=== Development ===
Four of the lots on the Paramount Hotel site, at 235–241 West 46th Street, had been acquired in 1925 by the Spear Construction Company. In December 1925, the 235 West 46th Street Company (a partnership between Isidore Zimmer, Samuel Resnick, and Frank Locker bought the sites at 235–241 West 46th Street. Zimmer, Resnick, and Locker further expanded the site in March 1926 with the acquisition of two lots at 243–245 West 46th Street, which could accommodate a structure of up to 23 stories. That June, Thomas W. Lamb filed plans for a hotel on the six lots on behalf of the 235 West 46th Street Company. The building was to contain a 1,015-seat theater at ground level with a ballroom, offices, and hotel rooms above it. Known as the Hotel Paramount, the building would have a Spanish Renaissance lobby, a 22-seat dining room, and nine storefronts, in addition to 12 stories of hotel rooms.

By January 1927, excavations had been completed on the site. At this time, the plans for the hotel were changed to provide for 612 rooms across 18 stories. Ultimately, the hotel was designed as a 700-room structure with 20 stories. The builders secured a $2 million loan (about $29 million in 2024 (Note: Johnston, Louis; Williamson, Samuel H. (2023). "What Was the U.S. GDP Then?". MeasuringWorth. United States Gross Domestic Product deflator figures follow the MeasuringWorth series.)) from Hughes and Hammond in May 1927. That November, the Garment Salesmen's Association (GSA) leased the 19th story of the hotel for use as a clubhouse. In March 1928, the New York Building Congress gave craftsmanship awards to 20 construction workers, and the Realty Acceptance Corporation placed a second mortgage loan of $350,000 on the building (equivalent to $5,036,000 in 2024). The hotel ultimately cost $5 million to erect (about $72 million in 2024). The Eighth Avenue Association presented a plaque to celebrate the hotel's completion, recognizing the hotel's "contribution to the prestige of the district".

=== 1920s to 1940s ===
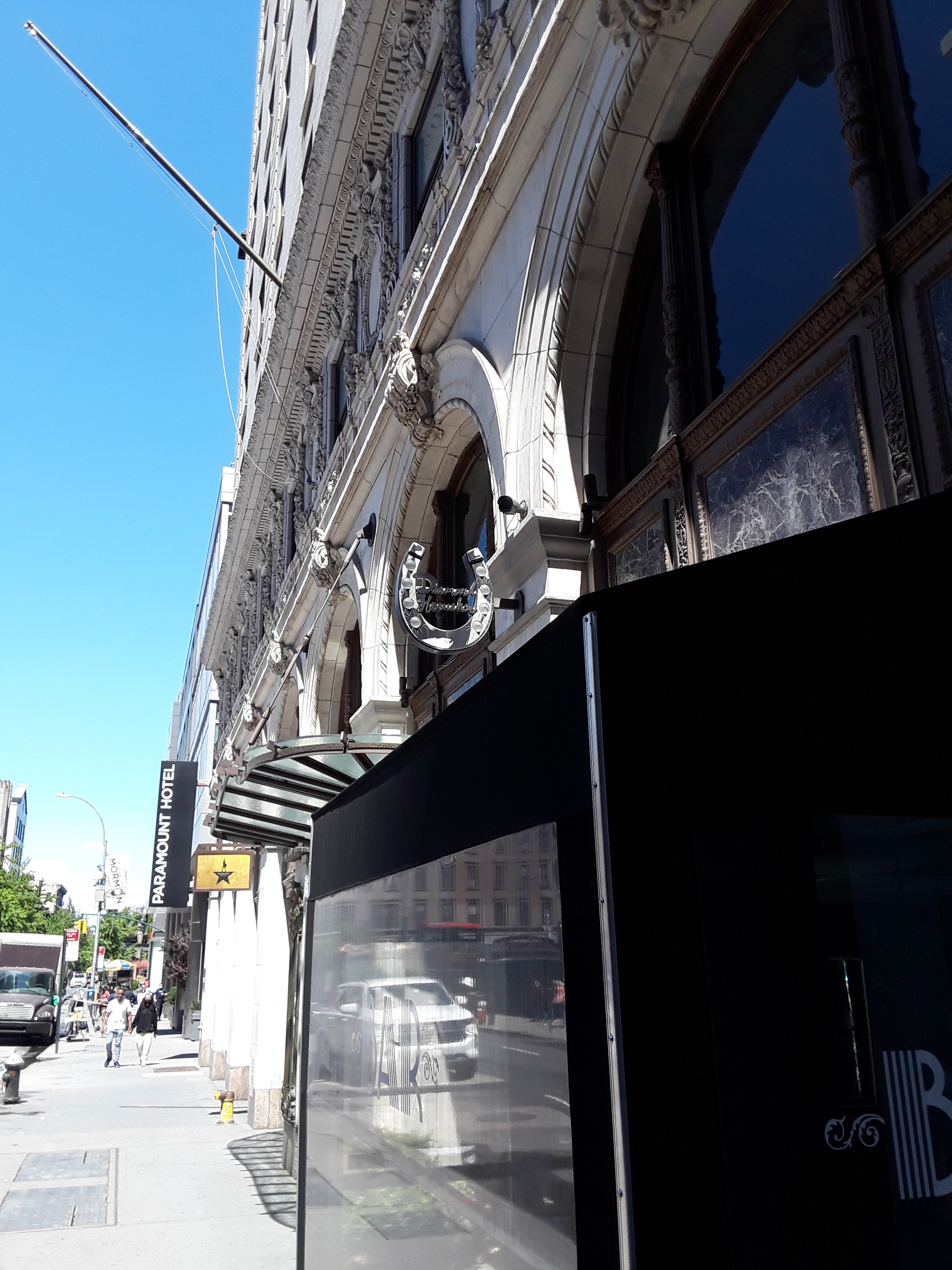
Entrance to Sony Hall, which replaced the 1930s Diamond Horseshoe nightclub

A. Lincoln Scott was hired as the Hotel Paramount's first manager, and he assumed operation of the hotel when it informally opened on June 5, 1928. The Paramount Hotel formally opened on June 12, 1928, with a dinner banquet attended by 600 to 800 guests. The GSA opened its own clubhouse in the hotel on August 1 of that year. The Hotel Paramount was in receivership by 1929, and the Irving Trust Company took over. In April 1930, the Hotel Paramount was sold to William J. Knott's Knott Hotel Corporation, along with seven other hotels; the operators hired Charles L. Ornstein as the new manager shortly thereafter.

Following a yearlong investigation, in mid-1930, the United States government requested an injunction against the hotel's grill room because it violated Prohibition-era ordinances. A judge granted the injunction in July 1930, prohibiting the grill room from operating. Afterward, the Hotel Paramount Grill was being used for musical performances. Charlie Barnet led a band there from 1932 onward.

The Chase National Bank foreclosed on the hotel's first mortgage loan in 1933, and Joseph A. Gavagan was named as the receiver. The next year, the 235 West 46th Street Company announced plans to reorganize under the Federal Bankruptcy Act. The hotel was again placed for auction in early 1935, with Chase taking over the building after submitting a bid of $500,000. In late 1938, entertainer Billy Rose hired Albert Johnson to design a nightclub in the hotel's basement, within the old grill room. The club opened that Christmas under the name Billy Rose's Diamond Horseshoe, earning $2 million over its first two years. Chase National Bank sold the Hotel Paramount in 1945 to Louis Ritter and Eugene Bogdanffy. The next year, the hotel was resold for $3.6 million to a Chicago-based syndicate represented by Abbell, Edelman, Portes, and Abbell. Charles Ornstein continued to manage the hotel. At the time, the Paramount was characterized as a "commercial transient hotel" with many full-time residents in the late 1940s. During this time, the hotel prospered and guests had full room service.

=== 1950s to early 1980s ===
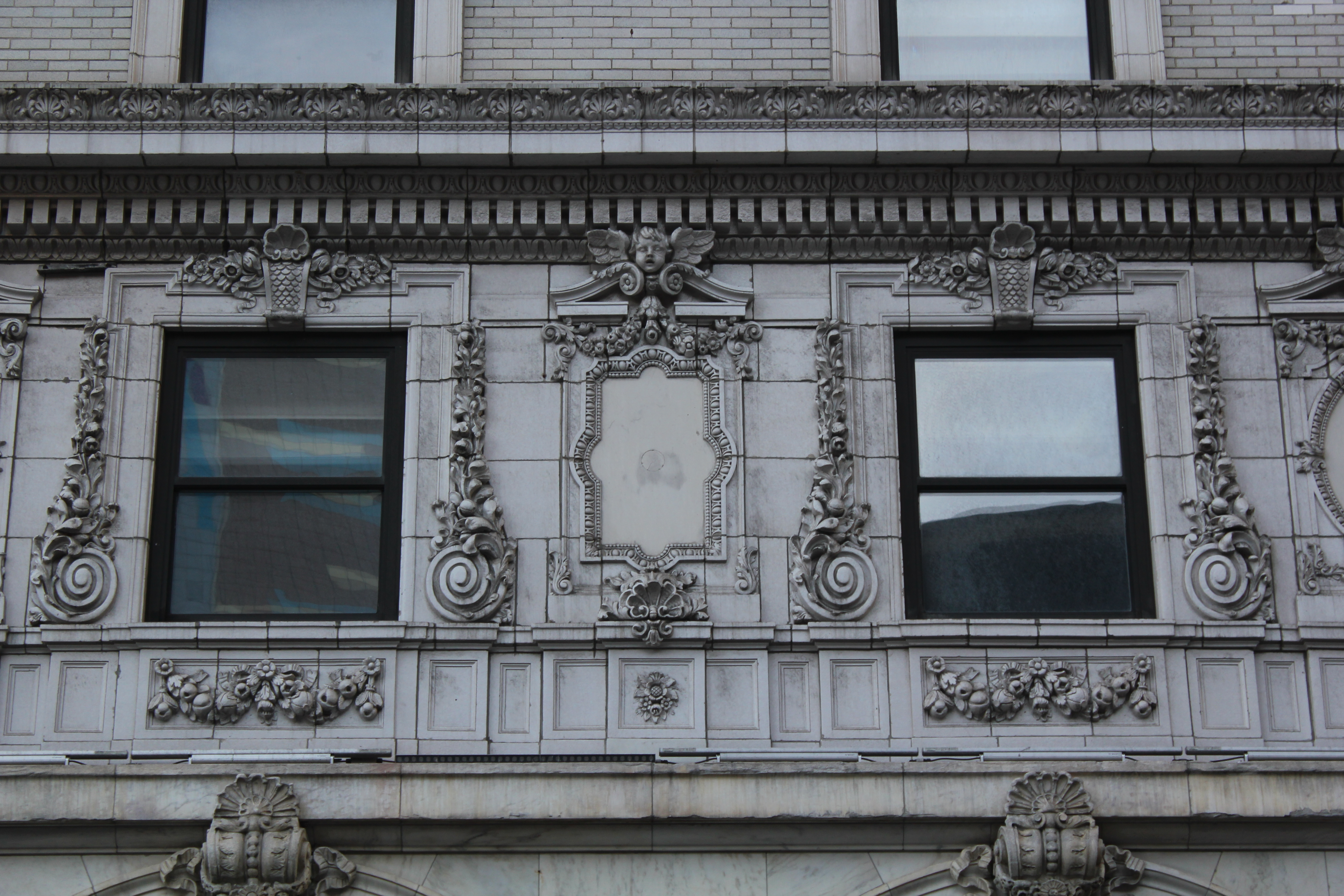
Window detail

The Diamond Horseshoe nightclub in the Paramount's basement closed in 1951, and figure skater Sonja Henie then attempted to operate an ice rink in the basement. After the nightclub's closure, the prices of rooms began to decrease, and room service was eliminated. Subsequently, the U.S. federal government began negotiating to lease the Paramount Hotel. In October 1953, after 14 months of negotiations, the government agreed to take over the hotel and convert it into offices for the Internal Revenue Service, but this conversion did not occur. At the time, the General Services Administration, which controlled the federal government's office space, was trying to reduce the amount of space it was leasing. Anthony Parella also proposed opening a legitimate theatre venue in the old Diamond Horseshoe space in 1954. Herbert A. Weissberg bought the Paramount from the Abbell hotel group in 1957. The Hotel Paramount's new owners obtained a $350,000 loan for the hotel in 1959, and George Geiger signed a lease to operate the hotel the same year.

The hotel's operators leased the Paramount's basement as a theater in December 1960 to the partnership of Irving Maidman and Norman Twain. Russell Patterson renovated the basement into the Mayfair Theatre, a 299-seat off-Broadway venue, which opened in March 1961. The following May, a real-estate syndicate headed by Frank H. Klein, Sheldon Hertz, Blair H. Goldberg, and Robert M. Rose acquired the Paramount's leasehold, and the Courtesy Operating Corporation took over the hotel's operations. At the time, the previous owners had spent $750,000 over the previous five years to renovate the hotel. The Mayfair lasted two years as an off-Broadway house before Maidman converted it to a cabaret venue. The hotel was sold yet again in the late 1960s, and its basement operated as a burlesque venue by 1969. In addition, a production studio for Sear Sound was built within the hotel in 1972. During much of the 1970s, the basement operated as a Broadway-class theater, while the hotel itself was called the Century-Paramount.

By 1980, the Century-Paramount was operating as a mid-priced hotel with single rooms ranging from $36 to $46 per night. A reviewer at the time said that, though the rooms were "not quaint" with excessively small closets, the reviewer said that "everything is well-kept". The next year, the Century Theatre in the hotel's basement was closed and converted to a school for accountants. During the mid-1980s, The New York Times characterized the hotel as "a scruffy tourist stop off Eighth Avenue", appealing to "low-budget European travelers willing to sleep four to a room". The New York City Landmarks Preservation Commission (LPC) had started considering protecting the interior of the Century-Paramount's basement as an official city landmark in 1982, with discussions continuing over the next several years; The LPC denied landmark status to the basement interior in 1987, during a wide-ranging effort to grant landmark status to Broadway theaters.

=== Schrager operation ===
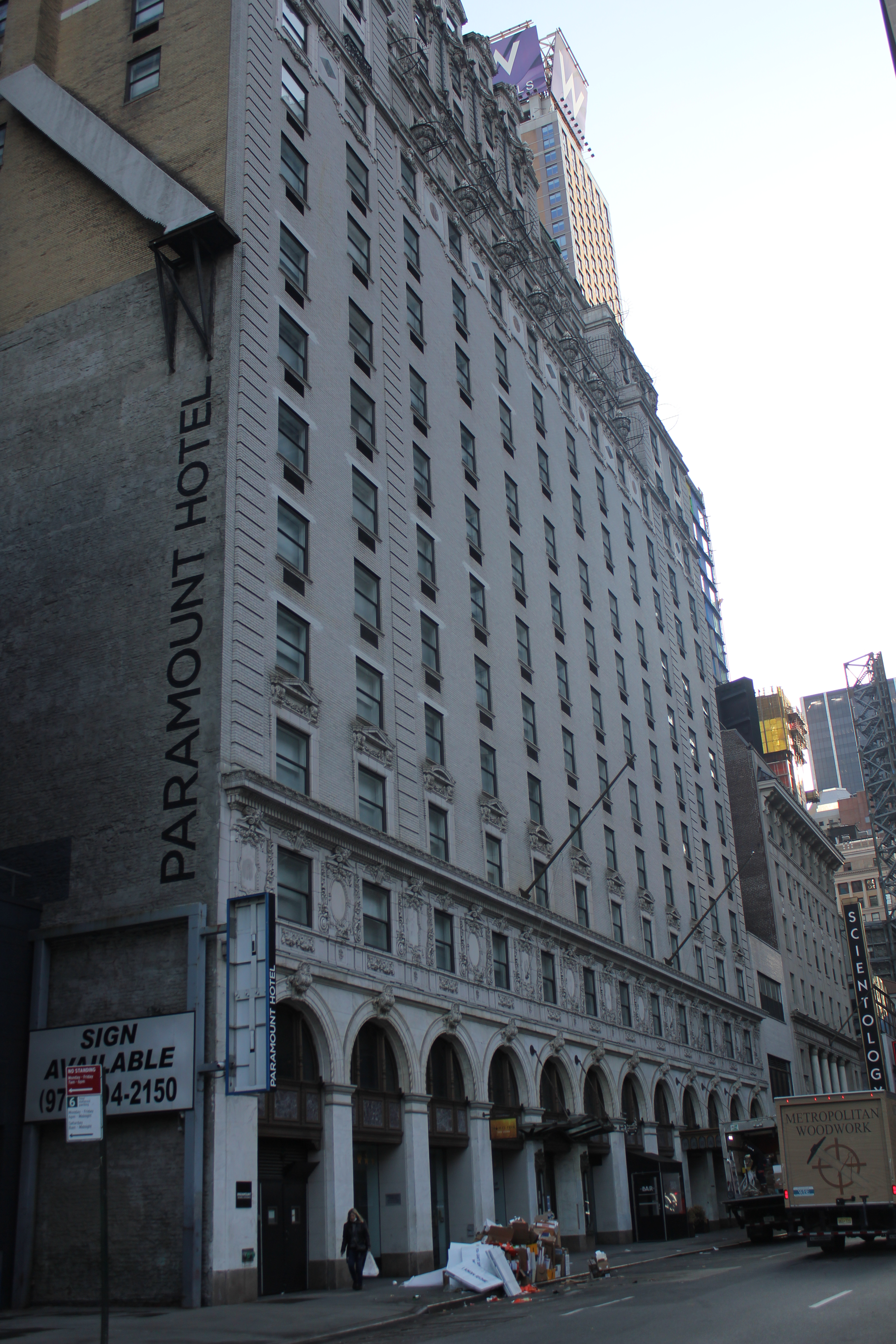
View from the west

Philip Pilevsky and Arthur G. Cohen acquired the Century-Paramount in 1986 for either $30 million or $35 million. The partners planned to renovate the hotel, including the basement theater. Pilevsky and Cohen delegated the operation to Ian Schrager and Steve Rubell, the former operators of the nightclub Studio 54. Schrager fired all of the hotel's 130 workers, interviewing 4,000 people to fill the positions; he advertised in entertainment magazines like Playbill and Variety, hosting auditions for candidates. Schrager had replaced the staff because he preferred workers who had "quirky beauty and elegance", as opposed to tenured hospitality workers, who he said were "too cynical" and "had too many ideas". Schrager was extremely selective about appearances as well; when he was selecting a uniform for workers at the hotel's bar, models tried on over a hundred outfits before Schrager found a uniform he liked.

Occupancy rates more than doubled from 38 percent in 1986 to 82 percent in 1988. When Rubell died shortly afterward, Schrager operated the hotel alone, his first venture without his longtime partner. Pilevsky considered selling the hotels that he had co-owned with Rubell and Schrager, including Morgans, the Royalton, and the Paramount. Nonetheless, Harper's Bazaar credited the three hotels with popularizing the boutique hotel industry.

The hotel was closed for an 18-month remodeling project in 1988. The space, redesigned by Haigh Architects with decorations by Philippe Starck, was renovated and renamed the Paramount Hotel. The project, which cost $31.3 million, added several amenities and eateries. The hotel's 610 rooms were reopened gradually starting in late 1989, with forty rooms being completed every two weeks. The hotel officially reopened in August 1990; to publicize the renovation, large numbers of apples were mailed to travel agents, an allusion to New York City's nickname, the Big Apple. Schrager also paid Wieden & Kennedy to create three advertisements for the hotel, which aired during the 1992 Academy Awards. The city's hotel-occupancy rate at the time was relatively high, and the surrounding neighborhood was rundown, leading one observer to write: "That Schrager would spend more than $1 million on ads right now is questionable." Despite its central location, the Paramount charged less than $100 per night for the cheapest rooms.

The hotel's restoration was part of a revival of the Times Square area. After the renovations, Schrager and Pilevsky fell behind on paying city taxes on the property, and they owed $2.6 million by 1991. The Whiskey Bar opened at the hotel in 1991 and was instantly popular; this was followed in 1992 by a restaurant called Brasserie des Theatres. Schrager planned to spend $2 million on renovating the vacant basement into a nightclub similar to Studio 54, but it remained empty. A restaurant named Coco Pazzo Teatro opened in the Paramount Hotel in 1996. Starck designed another renovation for the hotel in 1998, which took seven months and cost $7 million. The lobby's lighting was brightened, while the rooms were largely painted white and were refitted with new furniture. By that time, revenue per available room was about 6.6 percent higher than the average rate in the hospitality industry. The Whiskey Bar relocated to the W Times Square in 2001, and the space was replaced with a small bar.

=== 21st century ===
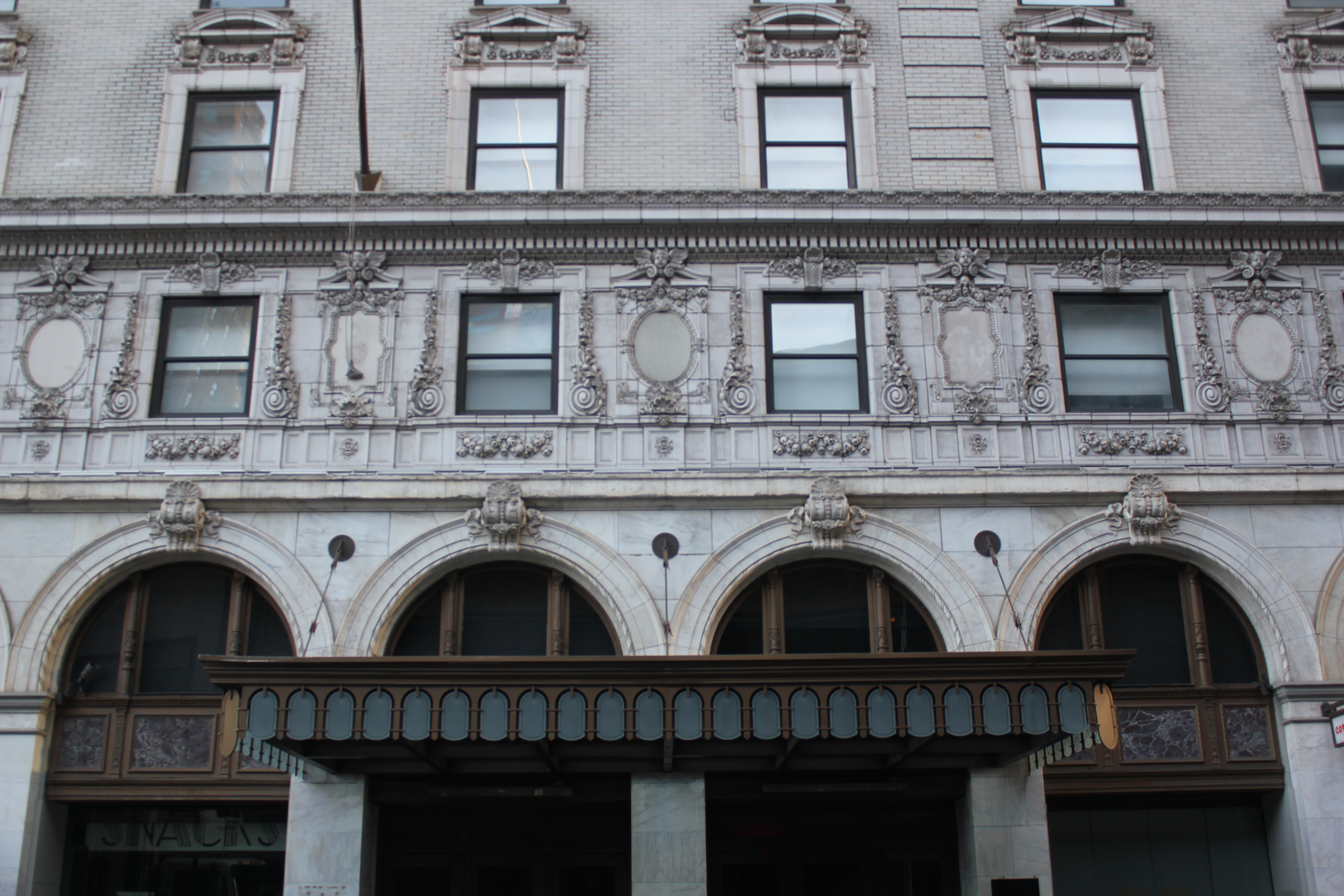
Entrance to the Paramount Hotel on the east side of the 46th Street facade

In 2004, Schrager sold the hotel for $126 million to Becker Ventures LLC, Sol Melia Hotels and Resorts, and Hard Rock Cafe. Sol Melia and Hard Rock, who were the minority stakeholders, planned to renovate the hotel and rename it as the Hard Rock Hotel New York. The renovation did not occur and the partnership between Sol Melia and Hard Rock dissolved in 2006, with the hotel being operated as the Paramount. Hard Rock was sold to the Seminole Tribe of Florida that year, and its ownership stake in the Paramount was sold to Walton Street Capital in 2007. The hotel was renovated in a project that was completed in April 2009. The LPC designated the hotel's exterior as a New York City landmark on November 17, 2009, citing the Paramount's importance as one of Lamb's few non-theatrical buildings.

By 2011, the hotel's owners Walton Street Capital and Highgate Holdings sought to sell off the hotel, which at the time had 597 rooms. That June, the hotel was sold to Aby Rosen's RFR Holding. RFR took out $40 million of mezzanine loans to finance the purchase and subsequently renovated the hotel for $40 million. The cost included a $20 million conversion of the long-abandoned basement into the Diamond Horseshoe entertainment venue, which opened at the end of 2013. RFR renovated the hotel again in 2015 and started soliciting buyers for the property. The renovation, designed by Stonehill & Taylor and Meyer Davis Studios, included the guestrooms, lobby, and other public areas. The Paramount Bar & Grill and a coffee bar called Corso were also opened inside the hotel. The Diamond Horseshoe closed in 2015 and served as a private space for three years. In March 2018, Blue Note Entertainment Group and Sony Music reopened the nightclub as the Sony Hall concert venue. RFR closed the Paramount Bar and Grill and the Corso coffee bar in February 2018, and it discontinued room service as well. That April, Rosen got a $140 million loan from Aareal Bank.

The Paramount Hotel closed indefinitely in March 2020 due to the COVID-19 pandemic in New York City. In late 2020, Rosen considered selling the hotel to Breaking Ground, a supportive housing group. According to Curbed, the hotel's quality had degraded by then, and "complaints on review sites ranged from mold on the ceiling to stained carpets to a cockroach in the bed". Breaking Ground formally proposed in early 2022 that the hotel be converted into 510 housing units and a 136-unit shelter for homeless adults. The plan required the support of the Hotel and Gaming Trades Council (HTC), a labor union representing the Paramount's workers. Although HTC supported legislation that allowed buildings to be converted to affordable housing, the conversion plan was ultimately canceled after HTC requested that Breaking Ground buy out the workers' contract for $50 million, which the organization could not afford. As a result, the Paramount Hotel reopened as a hotel in late 2022. RFR selected the management firm Generator to operate the hotel.

== Critical reception ==
In a review of the Paramount Hotel, the U.S. News & World Report wrote that the hotel "oozes trendiness, from its sophisticated lobby to its refined Paramount Bar & Grill to its stylish accommodations to its popular Diamond Horseshoe nightclub", although it noted that the hotel's rooms were very small. Similarly, a review in Oyster.com described the hotel as having a trendy yet unpretentious design, despite its small rooms and lack of on-site amenities. A writer for Westchester Magazine wrote in 2014 that the hotel carried a "mid-century-modern aesthetic with a 21st-century feel" and that the small room sizes was not unexpected given the hotel's location.

== See also ==
- List of hotels in New York City
- List of New York City Designated Landmarks in Manhattan from 14th to 59th Streets
