= Benjamin Noriega-Ortiz =

Puerto Rican architect

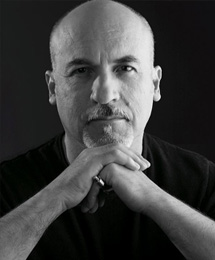
- Born: July 14, 1956 (age 70); Santurce, Puerto Rico
- Education: The University of Puerto Rico; Columbia University
- Occupations: Owner of BNO design, LLC
- Organization: BNO design
- Spouse: Steven Wine (m.2013)
- Awards: Crain’s New York business 40 under 40. Named Design Star by the D&D Building.
- Website: http://www.bnodesign.com

Benjamin Noriega-Ortiz is a Puerto Rican-born interior designer who founded BNO design, LLC. During his childhood, he lived in Puerto Rico's suburban area of Guaynabo and Luquillo Beach, where his parents had an apartment. After attending Margarita Janer High School in Guaynabo, he studied in the School of Architecture at the University of Puerto Rico.

== Career ==
Noriega-Ortiz completed his first master's degree in Architecture at the University of Puerto Rico in 1982. He moved to New York, where he earned a second master's degree in Architecture and Urban Design from Columbia University. Noriega-Ortiz started his career at the interior and product design studio of John F. Saladino, Inc. where he spent nine years, including six as head interior designer. He established his own firm, Benjamin Noriega-Ortiz, LLC in 1992. Benjamin was named one of New York Spaces' top 50 designers. He was also named one of the top 10 designers by House Beautiful. He is ranked by Mate in its 2012 list of 500 Power Gays in the world. Benjamin published two books: Emotional Rooms, The Sensual Interiors of Benjamin Noriega Ortiz and Suspended Reality, Interiors by Benjamin Noriega Ortiz. He has notably been featured in Elle Decor, New York Times, Departures, Vogue, Architectural Digest, and Condé Nast Traveler. Benjamin's clients have included Cartier, Diptique, Morgan Hotel Group, Renaissance Times Square, and NH Collection. As well as celebrity clients consisting of Lenny Kravitz, Laura Esquivel, Mark Seliger, Russell Simmons, Patricia Fields, and Sean Comb.
