= Ian Schrager =

American hotelier (born 1946)

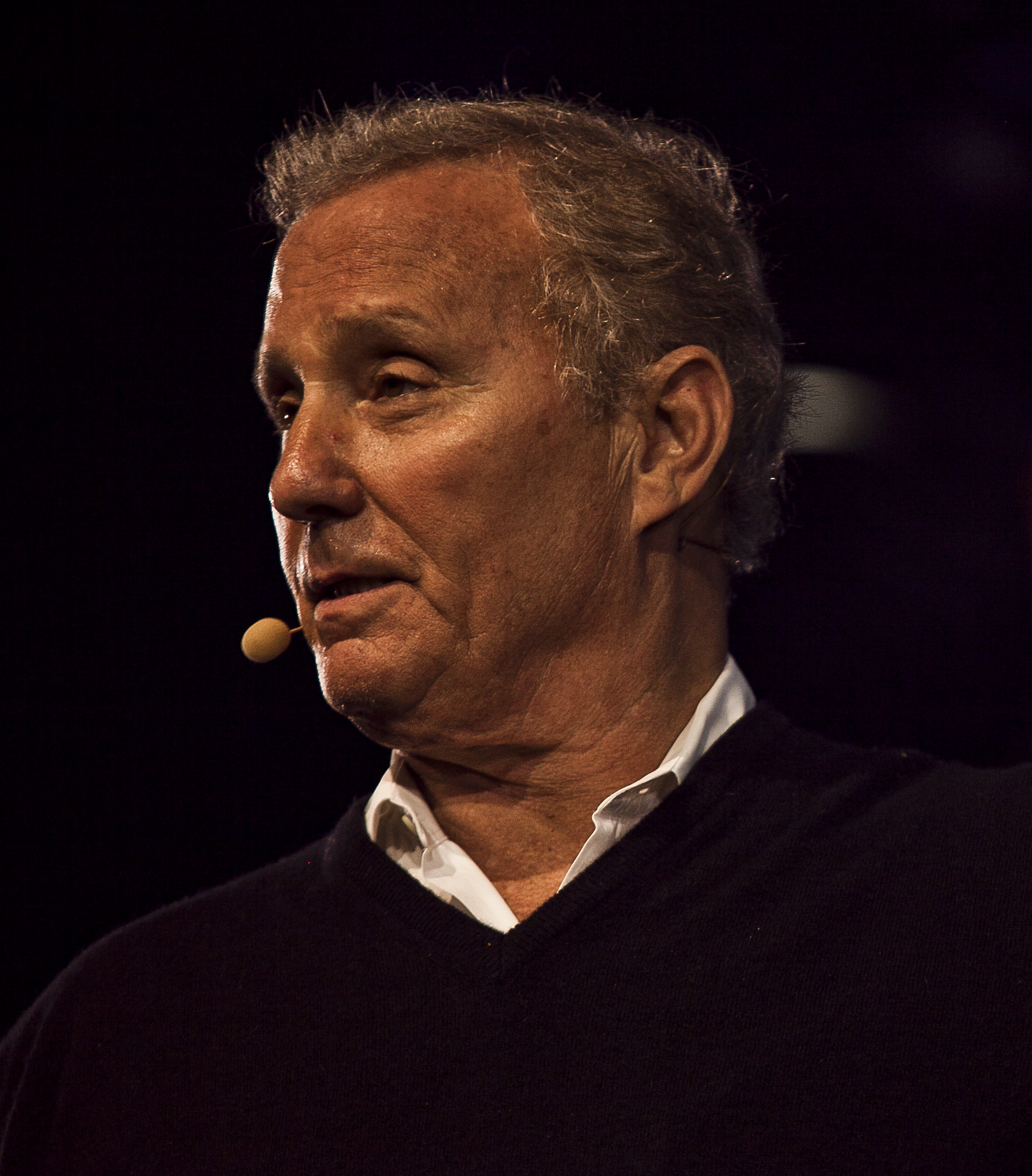
- Schrager in 2012
- Born: July 19, 1946 (age 80); New York City, U.S.
- Education: Syracuse University; St. John's University
- Known for: Co-founder of Studio 54; Co-owner of Morgans Hotel Group
- Spouses: Rita Noroña (m. 1994, divorced); Tania Wahlstedt (m. 2008)
- Website: ianschragercompany.com

Ian Schrager (born July 19, 1946) is an American entrepreneur, hotelier and real estate developer, credited for co-creating the "boutique hotel" category of accommodation. Originally, he gained fame as co-owner and co-founder of Studio 54.

== Early life and education ==
Schrager grew up in a Jewish family in New York City. His father Louis owned a factory in Long Branch, New Jersey, which manufactured women's coats and was an associate of Meyer Lansky whose nickname was "Max the Jew". Louis Schrager died when Ian was 19. His mother, Blanche, died when he was 23.

In 1968, he graduated from Syracuse University with a B.A. and then earned a J.D. from St. John's University School of Law in 1971. While at Syracuse, he was a member and eventual president of the Sigma Alpha Mu fraternity. It was through this fraternity that he met fellow brother Steve Rubell, with whom he would eventually go into business.

== Career ==
In the early 1970s, Schrager with Steve Rubell and Jon Addison bought 15 Lansdowne Street in Boston for a discotheque (the former The Ark, later Boston Tea Party).

=== Studio 54 ===
In December 1975, after practicing law for three years, Schrager partnered with Rubell to open Enchanted Garden, a disco in Douglaston, Queens. Seeing the success of Enchanted Garden, Schrager and Rubell decided to open a nightclub in Manhattan. In January 1977, Schrager and Rubell signed the lease for the Gallo Opera House which last served as a CBS television studio. Six weeks later, Studio 54 opened. The club's design drew on the venue's existing theatrical infrastructure allowing Schrager and Rubell to experiment with set and lighting design.

In December 1978, Studio 54 was raided after Rubell had been quoted as saying that only the Mafia made more money than the club brought in. In June 1979, Rubell and Schrager were charged with tax evasion, obstruction of justice, and conspiracy for reportedly skimming nearly $2.5 million in unreported income from the club's receipts, in a system Rubell called "cash-in, cash-out and skim." Police reports state that cash and receipts were in the building and were hidden in the ceiling sections of Rubell's office, where both he and Schrager worked.

A second raid occurred in December 1979. The pair hired Roy Cohn to defend them, but on January 18, 1980, they were sentenced to three and a half years in prison and a $20,000 fine each for the tax evasion charge. On February 4, 1980, Rubell and Schrager went to prison, and Studio 54 was sold in November of that year for $4.75 million. On January 30, 1981, Rubell and Schrager were released from prison to a halfway house for two and a half months.

On January 17, 2017, Schrager received a full and unconditional pardon from President Barack Obama.

=== Palladium ===
After Studio 54, Schrager and Rubell opened their next nightclub, Palladium, in the old Academy of Music building in New York City. They enlisted Japanese architect Arata Isozaki to reimagine the old music hall into a nightclub, while still maintaining the space's integrity. Palladium was the first of its kind in that art was the focal point of the club's experience. He collaborated with artists Francesco Clemente, Jean-Michel Basquiat, Julian Schnabel, Kenny Scharf, and Keith Haring to create a curated environment. Large video installations lining the dance floor were "undeniably powerful" as part of the art and architecture; throughout the night, multiple dynamic installations were featured as the screens were raised and lowered like pieces of a stage set. Schrager recognized the power great architecture had to influence an environment; working with Arata was just the beginning of his dabbling in architecture. He has since worked with architects, artists and designers such as Philippe Starck, Herzog & de Meuron, Andrée Putman, Julian Schnabel and John Pawson.

=== Morgans Hotel Group ===
Turning their attention to hotels, they found that their "on the pulse," keen instincts for the mood and feel of popular culture gave them a unique perspective that would allow them to significantly impact the hospitality industry just as they had done with nightlife. In 1984, Schrager and Rubell opened their first hotel, Morgans Hotel, named after John Pierpont (JP) Morgan's Morgan Library & Museum next-door. The instant hit introduced the boutique hotel category, becoming a "worldwide phenomenon."

Following the success of Morgans Hotel, they opened the Royalton Hotel and Paramount Hotel, both designed by Philippe Starck. With these properties, Schrager introduced "lobby socializing" where the hotel lobby became a new kind of gathering place for hotel guests and New York City residents alike, and "cheap chic" was affordable luxury offered in a stylish, sophisticated environment.

Schrager stayed in the hotel business and went solo after he lost his partner Steve Rubell, who died of early exposure to AIDS on July 25, 1989. Schrager is also credited with inventing the "urban resort" concept with his Delano Hotel in Miami and Mondrian Hotel in West Hollywood, also designed by Starck. These were followed by the Hudson Hotel in New York, where he fully realized his concept "hotel as lifestyle", which he continued to refine, expanding to cities such as San Francisco with the Clift Hotel and London with the St. Martins Lane Hotel and the Sanderson Hotel, all designed by the prolific Starck.

In June 2005, Schrager sold most of his stake in Morgans Hotel Group. Despite stepping down as chair and CEO, he retained $4 million in consultant pay and perks through end of 2007.

On Valentine's Day 2006, the namesake $MHG received an initial public offereing of $360 million underwritten by Morgan Stanley, with Schrager cashing in his remaining 450,000 shares for another $9 million. Morgans Hotel Group was a publicly traded company on NASDAQ for over a decade.

=== Ian Schrager Company ===
The same year, he launched the Ian Schrager Company, which owns, develops and manages hotels, residential and mixed-use projects. Since then, he has collaborated with Julian Schnabel to transform the Gramercy Park Hotel in New York City (which he no longer owns). Schrager has also built two residential properties: 40 Bond and 50 Gramercy Park North. 40 Bond was designed by Swiss architects Herzog & de Meuron as their first residential project in America.

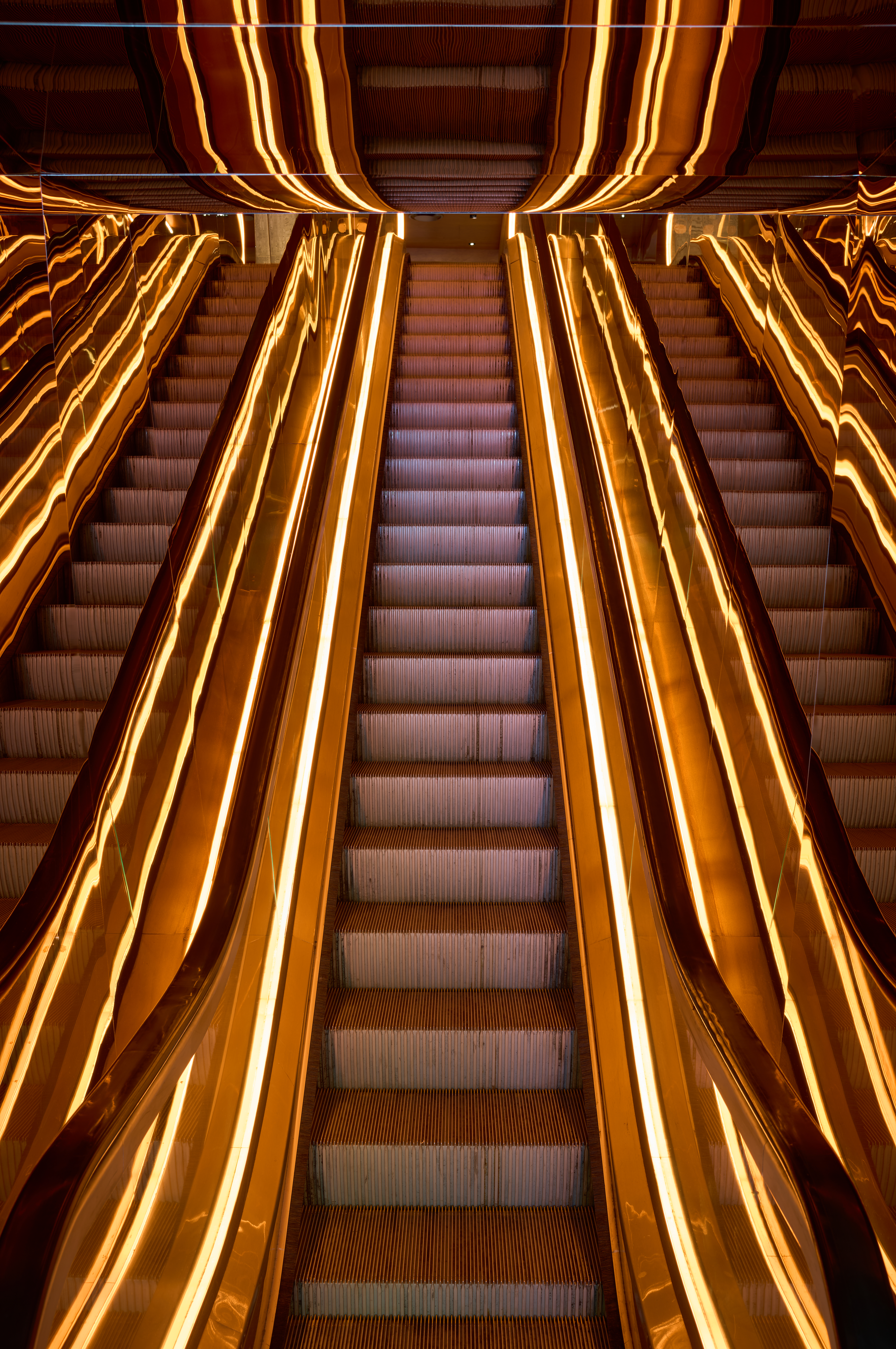
An escalator at the Public Hotel in Lower Manhattan

Schrager has a new hotel brand, Public. Schrager's Public Hotel Chicago opened in 2011. It was Schrager's first new project as an independent hotelier since 2005, after selling Morgans Hotel Group. Schrager later sold the Chicago hotel in 2016 to Gaw Capital Partners, based in Hong Kong. On June 7, 2017, Schrager opened the 367-room Public Hotel New York, at 215 Chrystie Street in the Bowery district. Public Hotel New York claims to have the fastest hotel wi-fi in New York City, which is free. The idea behind Public New York is "luxury for all," charging an inexpensive rate for quality and service. Most recently, it was chosen as the location for the afterparty for Garden of Turkish Delights, the first solo show in New York by esteemed Turkish artist, Sarp Yavuz, in cooperation with Trotter and Sholer, an emerging fine art gallery in NYC’s Lower East Side.

Schrager's most recent venture is EDITION Hotels, a partnership with Marriott International, intending to create a new brand of hotel with about 100 properties to be located in cities throughout North America, South America, Europe, and Asia. EDITION currently has hotels in London, Miami Beach, New York City, Sanya (China),Tampa, West Hollywood, Tokyo (two properties in Toranomon and Ginza), Barcelona, Bodrum, Rome, Madrid, Shanghai, Abu Dhabi, Singapore, the Mexican Riviera and Reykjavík, Iceland. According to their website, new hotels are slated to open in Jeddah, Nayarit, Fort Lauderdale, Bali, Dubai, Milan, Lake Como, Doha, Nashville, Scottsdale, Kuala Lumpur, and Detroit.

On May 20, 2020, it was announced that the Times Square EDITION in New York City would be closing permanently on August 13 after only 1 year in operation after going into foreclosure in December 2019, with financial problems exacerbated by the COVID-19 pandemic on New York and the global travel industry. However, it reopened in June 2021.

== Personal life ==
Schrager married Rita Noroña, a Cuban ballet dancer, on Valentine's Day in 1994. They have two daughters, Ava and Sophia.

On November 15, 2008, he married Tania Wahlstedt (née Garcia-Stefanovich), a former ballerina with the New York City Ballet. She has two daughters from a previous marriage and they have a son together.

== Awards ==
In June 2022, Schrager was recognized by the International Hospitality Institute on the Global 100 in Hospitality as one of the 100 Most Powerful People in Global Hospitality.

== See also ==
- Morgans Hotel Group
- List of people pardoned or granted clemency by the president of the United States
- Bill Marriott
