= Morgans Hotel =

Former hotel in Manhattan, New York

Coordinates: 40°44′59.3″N 73°58′52.3″W

- Interactive map of the Morgans Hotel area

General information
- Architectural style: Italian Romanesque
- Location: 237 Madison Avenue, Manhattan, New York City
- Named for: John Pierpont (JP) Morgan's Morgan Library & Museum
- Opened: 1984 (as Morgans Hotel); 1927 (previous ownership)
- Renovated: 2008
- Closed: 2018
- Owner: Morgans Hotel Group ($MHG), 1984-2016; SBE Entertainment Group, 2016-2017; Shel Capital and Kash Group (2017-2018 closed, converted to No. 237 condos)

Technical details
- Floor count: 19

Design and construction
- Architect: Andrew J. Thomas
- Developer: Ian Schrager
- Known for: World's first boutique hotel

Other information
- Number of rooms: 113 (1984); 149 (1927)
- Number of restaurants: 1

Website
- http://morganshotel.com

Morgans Hotel was the world's first boutique hotel, located at 237 Madison Avenue in New York City. Founded by Studio 54 cofounder Ian Schrager as the first property in the Morgans Hotel Group, it opened in 1984.

== History ==
The 1927 building was designed by architect Andrew J. Thomas, erected as Hotel Duane intended for long-term stays. An article of the era notes, "in design, the exterior of the building indicates a free interpretation of the Italian Romanesque style harmonizing very well with the fraternity clubs building at the north, designed in a similar style." When initially opened, the lobby and guest rooms showed "a rather free interpretation of Spanish Renaissance decoration." The hotel had operated under the name, Executive Hotel.

=== Morgans Hotel Group ===
In 1984, Studio 54 cofounders Ian Schrager and Steve Rubell opened their first hotel, Morgans Hotel, named after J. P. Morgan's Morgan Library & Museum nearby. Designed by Andrée Putman, the instant hit introduced the boutique hotel category, becoming a "worldwide phenomenon." In June 2005, Schrager sold most of his stake in the namesake Morgans Hotel Group to launch the Ian Schrager Company. Morgan Stanley underwrote MHG's initial public offering in February 2006, offering 18 million shares for about $20 each. Schrager cashed in his remaining 450,000 shares for another $9 million. Morgans Hotel Group was a publicly traded company on NASDAQ for over a decade.

=== SBE Entertainment Group ===
In May 2016, Sam Nazarian's SBE Entertainment Group agreed to acquire the namesake MHG for $805 million, in a take-private transaction completed November 30, 2016. The son of Qualcomm board member and stakeholder Younes Nazarian (via M&A), Nazarian and SBE are better known as owners of LA lounges frequented by celebrity patronage and HBO's Entourage, appearing as himself in the "No Cannes Do" episode.

=== Luxury condo conversion ===
In July 2017, the building was purchased by Shel Capital and Kash Group. The new owners closed Morgans Hotel and converted it to luxury condos in 2018, named No. 237.

== Design ==
Andrée Putman served as interior designer for the 1984 and 2008 complete renovations of the 1927 structure. New design features were evident throughout Morgans' public spaces, including:

An over-sized, 2-story, balconied "living room" lobby, with textured taupe-colored glass walls and overlaid bronze mullions, featuring a custom Putman-designed wool rug of black, rich camel and taupe in a bold three-dimensional cubist pattern.

Floors were in three varied shades of imported Italian granite in different finishes, with groupings of antique French leather club chairs, including a teak and caned plantation chair from the '40s, all culled from Paris' top flea markets. Putman designed dark wood end tables, with spherical-shaped desk lamps in nickel-plated brass created by Félix Aublet in 1925. Candles were lit in the evening, coupled with black-and-white checkerboard patterned wool throws loosely draped over the French club chairs to further accentuate the "lived-in" feel.

=== Accommodations ===
Like everything else in Morgans, the 114 guest rooms steered away from formulaic institutional design. To update guest lodgings, Putman began in the hotel corridors, covered in wool carpet rich taupe with a black-and-white checkerboard patterned border. Guest room doors were of French custom-birdseye maple. With only 4-8 rooms per floor, each hallway contributed to the hotel's residential feel.

Inside the room, the walls were painted with a mixture of four muted tones, producing an effect like that of an "Impressionist wall painting" — an unusual backdrop for the specially commissioned black and white photographs by Robert Mapplethorpe. In addition to a regular closet, each room featured a four-drawer dresser cabinet with full-length lighted wardrobe mirror.

Inside the bathroom, unconventional features include customized stainless steel airplane-like sinks and hospital fixtures, floor-to-ceiling shower doors and partitions in 3/4" glass and poured -in-lace granite floors.

Morgans' duplex penthouse suite is a 19th-floor suite that came complete with its own greenhouse, kitchen, multimedia room with 60" Sony color television, curved staircase and two terraces with city views. Decorated in the same spirit as all Morgans' guest rooms, the suite offered a classic black wood bench by Bertola, and Ecart steel tube and opaline glass coffee tables.
