= Steve Rubell =

American entrepreneur (1943–1989)

- Steve Rubell at Studio 54
- Born: December 2, 1943; New York City, U.S.
- Died: July 25, 1989 (aged 45); New York City, U.S.
- Education: Syracuse University
- Occupation: Nightclub owner
- Known for: Founder of Studio 54

Steve Rubell (December 2, 1943 – July 25, 1989) was an American entrepreneur and co-owner of the New York City disco Studio 54.

== Early life ==
Rubell and his brother Donald grew up in a Jewish family in the Crown Heights and Canarsie sections of Brooklyn, New York. His father worked as a postal worker and later became a tennis pro. Rubell attended Wingate High School and was also an avid tennis player, but decided against playing professionally.

Entering Syracuse University, Rubell completed bachelor's and master's degrees in finance. While attending college, Rubell met Ian Schrager, who became a lifelong friend and business partner. Rubell and Schrager were both brothers of the university's chapter of the Sigma Alpha Mu fraternity.

== Career ==
To avoid Vietnam War-era conscription, Rubell joined the New York Army National Guard, returning to the metropolitan area after a tour of duty in a military intelligence unit. He worked at a brokerage firm after his return. Rubell then decided to start his own business and opened two Steak Loft restaurants, one in New York City, and the other in Mystic, Connecticut.

=== Studio 54 era ===
With the help and knowledgeable influence of disco promoter Billy Amato (Smith), executive vice president 20th Century-Fox Records, Steve Rubell and Ian Schrager were introduced to the dance and disco market in early 1975 by John Addison of Le Jardin. Rubell and Schrager opened two clubs, one in Boston with John Addison from Le Jardin, the other, called The Enchanted Garden, in Queens in 1975, which later became Douglaston Manor. In April 1977, they opened Studio 54 in the old CBS Studio on West 54th Street that the network was selling. Rubell became a familiar face in front of the building, turning people away and only allowing entry to those who met his standards. Rubell also dealt with the club's celebrity patrons, ensuring that they were thrown lavish parties. His approach worked and the club made $7 million during its first year.

On December 14, 1978, Studio 54 was raided after Rubell was quoted as saying that only the Mafia made more money than the club brought in. In June 1979, Rubell and Schrager were charged with tax evasion, obstruction of justice, and conspiracy for reportedly skimming nearly $2.5 million in unreported income from the club's receipts, in a system Rubell called "cash-in, cash-out and skim." Police reports state that cash and receipts were in the building and were hidden in the ceiling sections of Rubell's office, where both he and Schrager worked. A second raid occurred in December 1979. The pair hired Roy Cohn to defend them, but on January 18, 1980, they were sentenced to three-and-a-half years in prison and a $20,000 fine each for the tax evasion charge. On February 4, 1980, Rubell and Schrager went to prison and Studio 54 was sold to Mark Fleischman in November of that year for $4.75 million. On April 17, 1981, Rubell and Schrager were released from prison after which they lived at a halfway house for two-and-a-half months.

=== Hotels ===
After their release on April 17, 1981, Rubell and Schrager opened the Executive Hotel on Madison Avenue and renamed it Morgans. The hotel was conveyed to them in lieu of payments due to them from defaulted promissory notes from the sale of the club. Steve Rubell and Ian Schrager later opened the Palladium, a large dance club famous for displaying art by Keith Haring, Kenny Scharf, Jean-Michel Basquiat, and Andy Warhol, and considered central to the New York club scene in the 1980s. In 1998, the Palladium was demolished so that New York University dorms could be built in its place.

== Death ==
In 1985, Rubell, who was closeted for most of his life, discovered he had contracted HIV, which later progressed to AIDS. He began taking AZT, but his illness was exacerbated by his continued drug use and drinking, which affected his compromised immune system. A few weeks before his death, Rubell checked into Beth Israel Medical Center in New York City under an assumed name, to seek treatment for severe peptic ulcers, kidney failure, and hepatitis. He died there on July 25, 1989. Rubell's official cause of death is listed as hepatitis and septic shock complicated by AIDS.

Rubell's private funeral was attended by numerous Studio 54 regulars including Bianca Jagger and Calvin Klein on July 27 at the Riverside Memorial Chapel on Amsterdam Avenue and 76th Street in Manhattan. He is buried at Beth Moses Cemetery in Farmingdale, New York.

== In popular culture ==
Mike Myers portrayed Steve Rubell in the 1998 drama film 54.

Rubell has also been the topic of an episode of Biography titled "Steve Rubell: Lord of the Disco".
