= Boutique hotel =

Small, upscale hotel

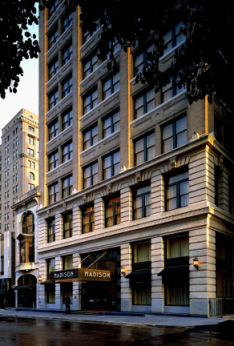
110-room Hu. Hotel in Memphis, Tennessee

Boutique hotels are small-capacity hotels that provide more personalized service than typical hotels. They typically have fewer than a hundred rooms, and are considered more "trendy" and "intimate", often due to their location in urban areas. They will usually also display a strong sense of aesthetic, and have a unique, un-homogenized character. They may be themed too, such as by having a focus on nature, environment, cuisine, history, community and cultural immersion, attentive service, or well-being.

== History ==
Boutique hotels first began appearing in the late 1970s and early 1980s in cities such as London, New York, and San Francisco. Early properties associated with the movement included Blakes Hotel in South Kensington, London, opened by Anouska Hempel in 1978; the Clarion Bedford Hotel in San Francisco, opened by Bill Kimpton in 1981; and Morgans Hotel in New York City, opened by Ian Schrager and Steve Rubell in 1984.

The term "boutique hotel" was coined by Steve Rubell, who compared Morgans Hotel to a boutique as opposed to a department store, to which chain hotels were compared. The hotelier Ian Schrager and the interior designer Andrée Putman are credited with opening the first boutique hotel, still known as the Morgans Hotel.

In recent times, boutique hotels have grown in popularity, corresponding with the general public's increased interest in individualized service. Many hotel chains have begun to focus on creating subsidiary hotels to establish smaller, boutique-style hotels, or in acquiring previously independent boutique hotels.

== Description ==
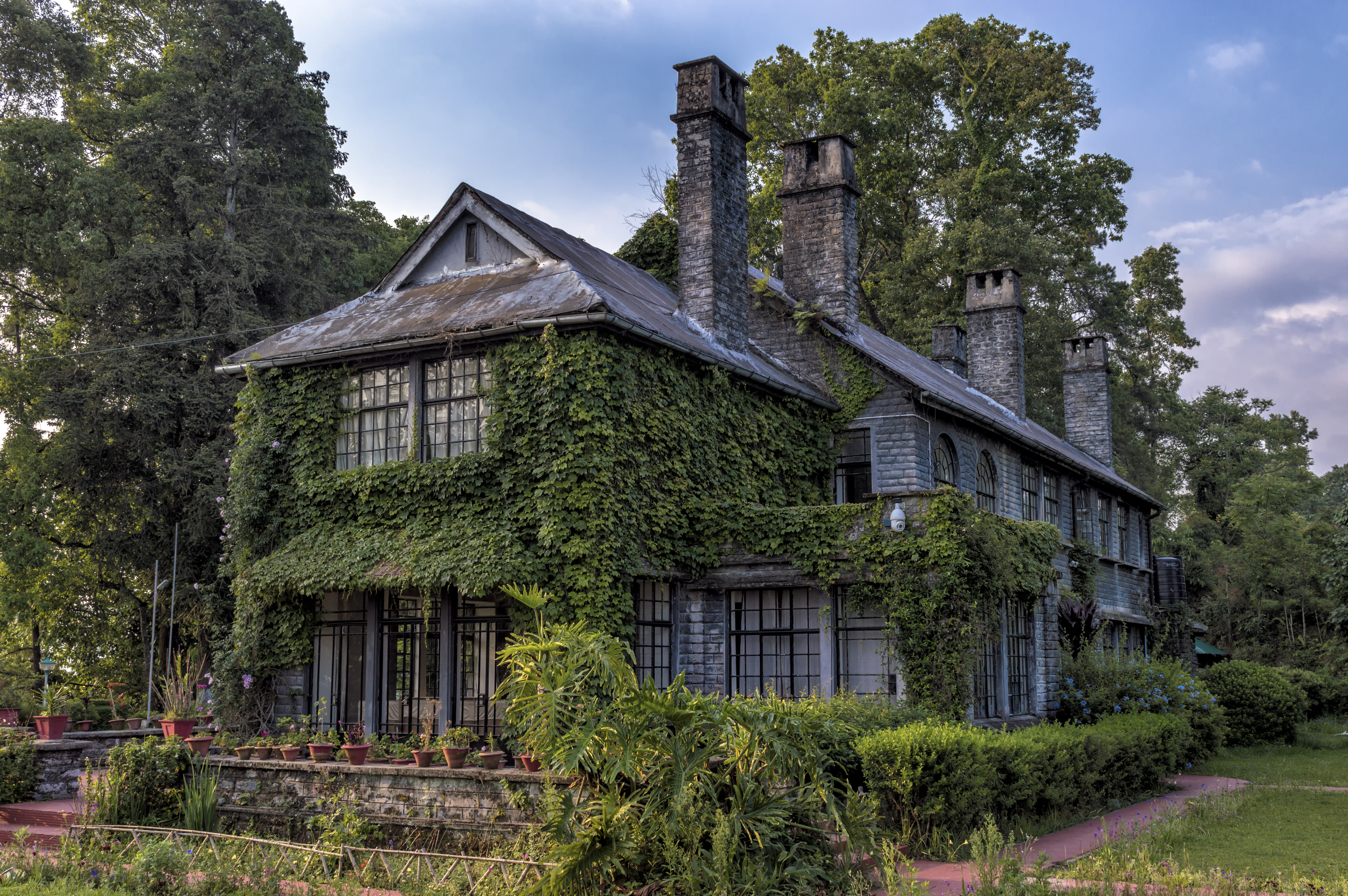
Morgan House, a colonial mansion in Kalimpong, India, has been converted into a boutique hotel

Boutique hotels are typically furnished in a themed, stylish, and/or aspirational manner with distinctive concepts. These concepts often reflect the local culture of the neighborhoods in which the hotels are located. Typically, these hotels are designed to have a more "intimate" feel than many larger hotel chains.

Boutique hotels are commonly found in the city centers of London, New York City, Miami, New Orleans, and Los Angeles. They are also found in resort destinations and may be furnished with amenities such as spa, yoga, and instructor-led painting classes.
