= Isabelle de Borchgrave =

Belgian artist (1946–2024)

Isabelle, Countess de Borchgrave d'Altena
- Born: Isabelle Jeanne Marie Alice Jacobs; 10 April 1946; Brussels, Belgium
- Died: 17 October 2024 (aged 78); Brussels, Belgium
- Education: Centre des Arts Décoratifs, Brussels; Académie Royale des Beaux-Arts, Brussels
- Known for: Painting, paper sculpture, installation art, collage

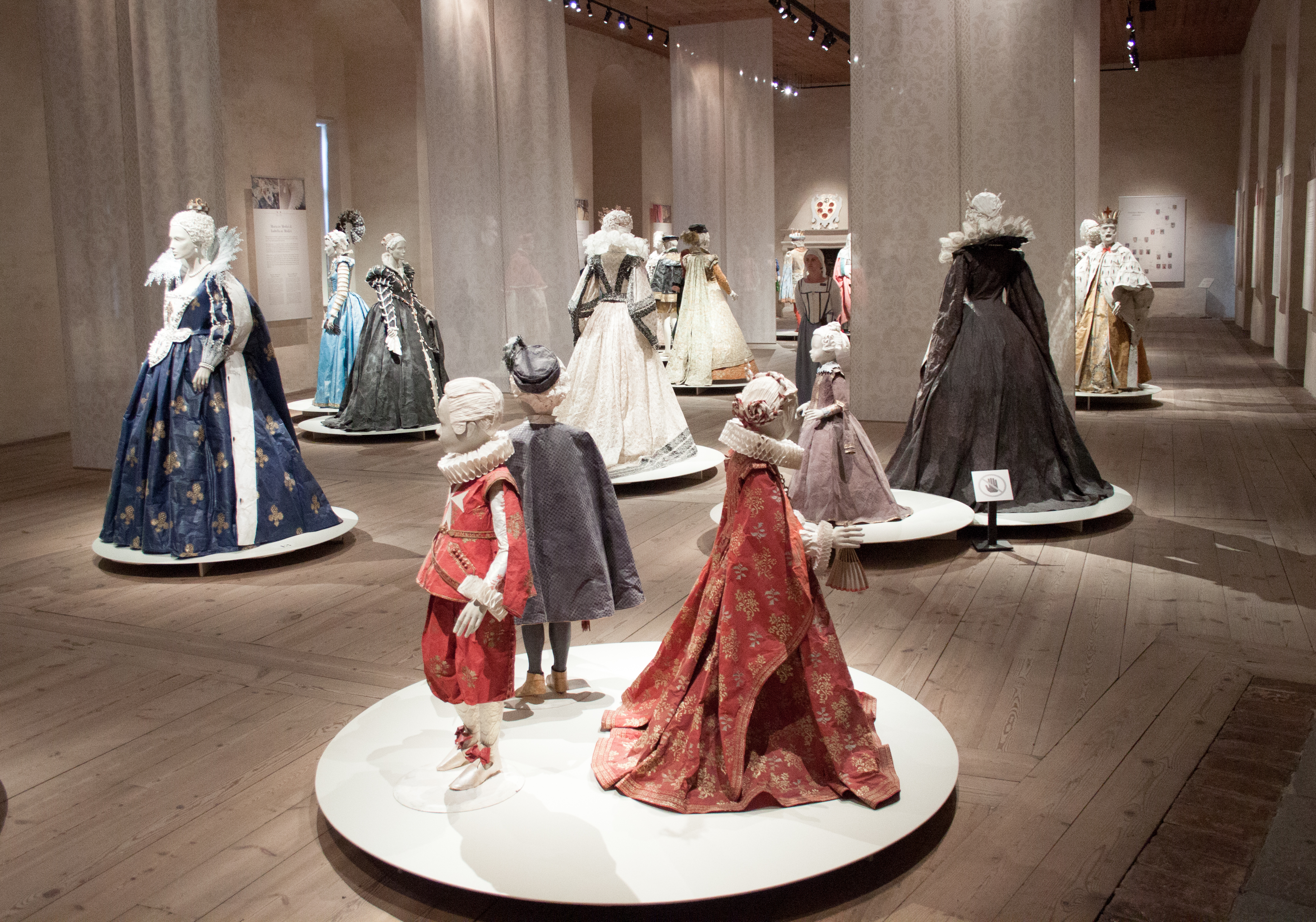
Isabelle de Borchgrave exhibition in Kalmar Castle

Countess Isabelle de Borchgrave d'Altena (born Isabelle Jeanne Marie Alice Jacobs; 10 April 1946 – 17 October 2024) was a Belgian artist and sculptor, best known for her colorful paintings, intricately painted paper sculptures, paper garments, and wearable art. She was married to Count Werner de Borchgrave d'Altena.

== Early life ==
Isabelle Jeanne Marie Alice Jacobs was born in Brussels, Belgium, in 1946. Disliking school, she left at age 14, began her art studies at the Centre des Arts Décoratifs, and, later, continued at Académie Royale des Beaux-Arts in Brussels. De Borchgrave worked in advertising for less than a year after she had finished studying, and then made clothes for her friends before branching out into interior design. She later established her own studio, designing dresses, scarves, jewelry, accessories and, in particular, also designing fabrics.

== Career ==
Following a visit to the Metropolitan Museum of Art in New York in 1994, de Borchgrave began designing paper costumes. She worked on four big collections, all in paper and trompe-l'œil, each of which set the scene for a very different world. "Papiers à la Mode" (Paper in Fashion), the first, was a collaborative effort with the Canadian costume designer Rita Brown and covered 300 years of fashion history, from Elizabeth I to Coco Chanel. "Mariano Fortuny" dealt with the world of 19th century Venice, paying particular attention to the elegant plissés and veils. "I Medici" was a trompe-l'œil installation of famous Florentine figures in the ceremonial dresses of the Renaissance, with intricate gold-braiding, pearls, silk and velvet. Then came Sergei Diaghilev's "Ballets Russes", that paid tribute to the impresario, as well as the artists Pablo Picasso, Léon Bakst, and Henri Matisse, all of whom designed costumes for that ballet company.

A major turning point in de Borchgrave's career came in 1998 with her exhibition, "Papier à la Mode", at Musée de l'Impression sur Etoffes in Mulhouse, France. It consisted of thirty lifesize outfits made of painted paper. "Papier à la Mode", which The New York Times called "pure delight", toured France, the United States and Asia. As it traveled, de Borchgrave expanded it - with costumes from the wardrobes of Queen Elizabeth I of England, Marie Antoinette, and the Empress Eugénie, the consort of Napoleon III, while it was in Japan, and adding Ottoman kaftans in Turkey.

Borchgrave d'Altena family coat of arms

Over the years, de Borchgrave's paper creations have ranged from an elaborate headdress in the shape of a caravel in full sail, worn by Marie Antoinette, to some oversized roses for John Galliano's haute couture show for Christian Dior, to a subtle, white on white wedding dress train worn by Princess Annemarie of Bourbon-Parma at her wedding with Prince Carlos of Bourbon-Parma. She was also commissioned to recreate Jackie Bouvier's wedding gown for the John F. Kennedy Library and Museum in Boston. "It was dusty and fragile, wrapped up in black tissue paper", de Borchgrave recalled, "The silk was dead, you couldn't touch it any more. It was preserved like a relic. The original is dead, but the paper one brings it to life again." In 2004, de Borchgrave designed and made a delicate, painted paper dress for Queen Fabiola of Belgium, which the queen wore to the wedding of Prince Felipe of Spain in Madrid.

In 2008, an installation of over 80 pieces by de Borchgrave opened at the Fortuny Museum in Venice. Entitled "Un mondo di carta - Isabelle de Borchgrave incontra Mariano Fortuny", ("A World of Paper: Isabelle de Borchgrave Meets Mariano Fortuny") the exhibition was spread over the historic palazzo's three floors and included versions of Fortuny's classic, finely pleated "Delphos" dress, as well as robes, shoes and other accessories and props, all made of painted paper. Reviewing the installation for The World of Interiors magazine, author Barbara Stoeltie wrote, "de Borchgrave freely shares her adventures in beauty – a beauty that, beneath her gaze and from her fingertips, pours out unstintingly. Tubes of paint, boxes of pastels, sheaves of brushes of all sizes and all kinds of glue gleefully take part in her marvellous game. The work itself rejoices."

In 2008, an illustrated hardcover monograph "Paper Illusions: The Art of Isabelle de Borchgrave" was published in the United States by Abrams Books. The book was well reviewed by The New York Times. The monograph was authored by Barbara and René Stoeltie, with an introduction by Hubert de Givenchy.

In February 2011, a large scale installation, "Pulp Fashion: The Art of Isabelle de Borchgrave" opened at the Palace of the Legion of Honor in San Francisco. The retrospective exhibition was presented in six sections: "The Artist's Studio"; "In White" showcased a selection of nine dresses; "Papiers à la Mode" featured iconic looks from key periods in fashion history signature designer pieces; "Fortuny" was an immersive environment created under a paper tent populated by recreations of Fortuny's famed pleated and draped gowns; "The Medici" and "Inspiration" – work inspired by four paintings from the Legion of Honor's collection. Quoted in the San Francisco Chronicle, John Buchanan, the museum's director, called the exhibition "pure poetry". "This is the coolest thing I've ever seen", he added.

In de Borchgrave's art, the starting point is almost always the same: sheets of paper one by one and a half meters (3.3 by 4.9 ft), which she sets to work on with her brushes and paints on an enormous linen-covered table in her studio in Brussels. "Her colors, reports The New York Times, "are very much inspired by her travels: reds from the roses of Turkey, earth hues from Egypt, blues from Greece...Borchgrave produces astonishing effects of scintillating color, weight, transparency and texture. Her renderings of diaphanous gauzes are especially astonishing."

In 2012, de Borchgrave created an installment for the Hillwood Estate, Museums and Gardens in Washington, D.C, titled Pret-a-Papier: The Exquisite Art of Isabelle de Borchgrave. The installment featured Borchgrave's elaborately patterned paper sculptures of shoes, gowns, ballgowns and dress. Many were historically inspired.

De Borchgrave also designed patterns for party items for American retail store, Target.

De Borchgrave's work has been widely collected by major museums and private collectors. She is represented in the U.S. by the Serge Sorokko Gallery.

== Personal life and death ==
Isabelle Jacobs married Count Werner de Borchgrave d'Altena in 1975. They had two children, and resided in Brussels.

She died in Brussels at the age of 78 on 17 October 2024, from cancer.

== Museum exhibitions ==
- 2018, "Fashioning Art from Paper" at the Frick Art & Historical Center, Pittsburgh, Pennsylvania.
- 2010, a paper dress by de Borchgrave was included in "Extending the Runway: Tatiana Sorokko Style" at the Phoenix Art Museum in Arizona.
- 2008, "Rêves de Papier - Isabelle de Borchgrave interprète Mariano Fortuny" opened at the Musée des Tissus in Lyon.
- 2007, paper sculptures by Isabelle de Borchgrave, at the "Decorative Arts of the Kings" exhibition at the High Museum of Art, Atlanta, Georgia.
- 1998, "Papiers à la Mode" at the Musée de l'Impression sur Etoffes in Mulhouse, France.

== Bibliography ==
- Globus, D. (2001). The Pop-Up History of Costumes And Dresses. Universe Publishing. ISBN 078-930-507-0.
- De Borchgrave, Isabelle (2004). Mes Carnets De Venise. Flammarion, Paris. ISBN 978-2-08-030455-1.
- Sadraee, Saeed (2004). The Textile Collection of Saeed Sadraee Revisited By Isabelle De Borchgrave. Sadraee. ASIN B000VAD81M.
- Charial, Jean-André, De Borchgrave, Isabelle (2005). Saveurs De Provence. Flammarion, Paris. ISBN 2-08-201273-5.
- Brown, Rita, De Borchgrave, Isabelle (2008). Papier À La Mode. Cosacnaify, Brésil. p. 408. ISBN 978-85-7503-743-0.
- Barbini, Pascaline (2008). Un Mondo Di Carta - Isabelle De Borchgrave Incontra Mariano Fortuny. Skira, Milan. ISBN 978-88-6130-719-3.
- Stoeltie, Barbara & René (2008). Paper Illusions: The Art of Isabelle de Borchgrave. Abrams, USA. ISBN 978-0-8109-7133-2.
- Renzi, M., Acidini, C. (2010). I Medici: il sogno ritorna. Isabelle de Borchgrave a Palazzo Medici Riccardi. Alias. ISBN 978-88-96532-00-3.
- D'Alessandro, Jill (2011). Pulp Fashion: The Art of Isabelle de Borchgrave. Fine Arts Museums of San Francisco & Prestel, USA. ISBN 978-3-7913-5105-6.
