= Ralph Rucci =

American fashion designer and artist

- Born: 1957 (age 68–69); Philadelphia, Pennsylvania, U.S.
- Education: St. Joseph's Preparatory School, Temple University, Fashion Institute of Technology
- Label: RR331
- Awards: Cooper-Hewitt National Design Award, 2008, The Couture Council of The Museum at FIT, 2006; Pratt Institute Icon Award, 2009; The Philadelphia International Festival of the Arts Visionary Award for Fashion, 2011; SCAD André Leon Talley Lifetime Achievement Award, 2012; Honorary Doctoral Degree from Drexel University College of Art and Design, 2015

Ralph Rucci (born 1957) is an American fashion designer and artist. He is known in particular for Chado Ralph Rucci, a luxury clothing and accessories line. Rucci's clothing designs have appeared in a number of major exhibitions, and he has won significant fashion-industry awards. The designer, whose clothing has received positive critical response in the fashion press, is the subject of a recent documentary.

== Life and career ==
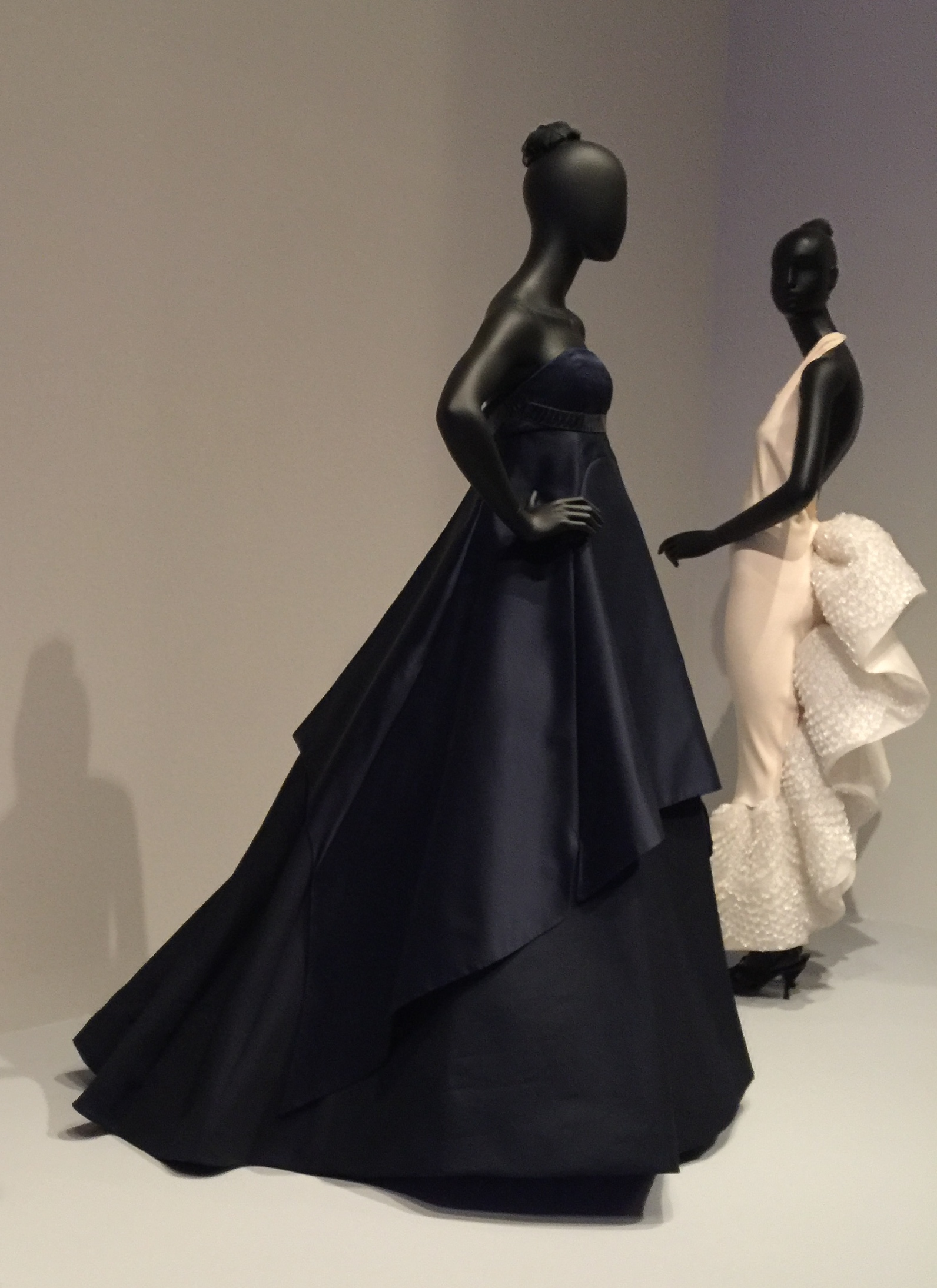
Ralph Rucci "Stingray Swan" evening gown, Spring-Summer 2001 (PMA)

Rucci was born and raised in Philadelphia, and holds a degree in philosophy from Temple University. At the age of 21, he moved to New York to study at the Fashion Institute of Technology and later trained under Halston and a Balenciaga patternmaker. He had his first formal show at New York's Westbury Hotel in 1981, but launched Chado Ralph Rucci over a decade later, in 1994, and began showing at New York Fashion Week in 1999. In 2002, Rucci became the first American designer in more than 60 years to be invited to show in Paris by the French Chambre Syndicale de la Haute Couture (the only other designer to be so honored was Mainbocher), and he showed his haute couture collections in Paris for the next five seasons. He has twice been nominated for the Council of Fashion Designers of America's Womenswear Designer of the Year Award. Rucci is also a painter, who has exhibited in art galleries throughout the U.S. His paintings, exhibited at the Serge Sorokko Gallery in San Francisco in December, 2012, were described by Architectural Digest as "enigmatic works... bearing sweeping brushstrokes that are collaged, here and there, with scraps of silken fabrics."

From the beginning of his career, Rucci was inspired by the style of such fashion icons as Elsa Peretti (for her "biomorphic nature") and Pauline de Rothschild (for "creating harmony out of disorder"). Rucci's influences also include the painters Cy Twombly, Franz Kline, Antoni Tàpies and Francis Bacon, sculptor Louise Nevelson, Japanese symbolism, and the designer James Galanos. Rucci's "individual mind" has been praised, as well as his "distinct point of view," as The New York Times noted in a review on a 2007 Rucci exhibition at the Fashion Institute of Technology.

In 2007, fashion historian Valerie Steele wrote The Art of Weightlessness, an illustrated monograph published by the Yale University Press on the occasion of Rucci's exhibition at the FIT Museum. In 2008, the documentary Ralph Rucci: A Designer and His House, narrated by Martha Stewart, premiered on the Sundance Channel. In 2011, Rucci was inducted into the Fashion Group International Walk of Fame. In December 2011, Bauer and Dean published Autobiography of a Fashion Designer: Ralph Rucci, with photographs by Baldomero Fernandez. In 2012, Rucci received an André Leon Talley Lifetime Achievement Award from the Savannah College of Art and Design.

== Chado Ralph Rucci ==
Rucci launched the Chado Ralph Rucci line in 1994, "chado" coming from the Japanese tea ceremony noted for its attention to detail, exactitude, sense of austere style, and expertise on the part of the practitioner.

According to Cathy Horyn of The New York Times, "Mr. Rucci’s clothes have a devotion to elegance that can feel as pitiless as a sermon on a hot summer day," while Robin Givhan of The Washington Post wrote that "Rucci's clothes are aspirational in every sense of the word. They ooze luxury from 100 paces, yet they are not ostentatious. They look expensive because every seam is perfect, every button exactly placed, every skirt has just the right lift. No dress of his would dare wrinkle."

Rucci's gowns are included in the permanent collections of the Victoria and Albert Museum in London, the Costume Institute of the Metropolitan Museum of Art in New York, DeYoung Museum in San Francisco, the Philadelphia Museum of Art, the Phoenix Art Museum, the Los Angeles Museum of Contemporary Art, and the Texas Fashion Collection in Denton, Texas, among others.

== Museum exhibitions ==
- 2003: Rucci's gown was included in "Goddess" exhibition at the Costume Institute of the Metropolitan Museum of Art in New York, N.Y.
- 2004: Rucci's gown was included in "Goddess" exhibition at the Mode Museum in Antwerp, Belgium
- 2005: Rucci's designs were included in “Cut and Construction: The Foundations of Fashion” exhibition at the Pratt Institute in New York, N.Y.
- 2005: Chado Ralph Rucci was the subject of a retrospective exhibition at the Costume Institute of the Kent State University Museum in Kent, Ohio.
- 2005: a Chado Ralph Rucci garment was included in the "She's Like a Rainbow: Colors in Fashion" exhibition at the Museum at the Fashion Institute of Technology in New York, N.Y.
- 2006: Rucci's designs were exhibited at a group show entitled "Breaking the Mode" at the Los Angeles County Museum of Art, in Los Angeles, California.
- 2006: a Rucci gown was included in the "Glamour: Fashion, Film, Fantasy" exhibition at the Museum at the Fashion Institute of Technology in New York, N.Y.
- 2006: Rucci's designs were included in the "Skin + Bones: Parallel Practices in Fashion and Architecture" exhibition at the Los Angeles Museum of Contemporary Art in Los Angeles, California
- 2007: a solo installation entitled "Ralph Rucci: The Art of Weightlessness" was mounted at the Museum at the Fashion Institute of Technology in New York, N.Y.
- 2008: a retrospective solo exhibition opened at the Phoenix Art Museum in Phoenix, Arizona.
- 2008: Rucci's gowns went on exhibit entitled "A Passion for Perfection: James Galanos, Gustave Tassell, Ralph Rucci" at the Philadelphia Museum of Art in Philadelphia, Pennsylvania.
- 2009: Rucci's designs were included in the group show "American Beauty: Aesthetics and Innovation in Fashion" at the Museum at the Fashion Institute of Technology in New York, N.Y.
- 2010: a collection of Rucci's haute couture gowns went on exhibit entitled "Extending the Runway: Tatiana Sorokko Style", at the Moscow Fashion Museum in Moscow, Russia.
- 2010: a Halston gown, designed by Rucci when he worked for the House of Halston in the late 1970s, was attributed to Ralph Rucci and included in the "American High Style: Fashioning a National Collection" exhibition at the Brooklyn Museum in Brooklyn, N.Y.
- 2012: Rucci's designs went on exhibit at the Savannah College of Art and Design Museum in Savannah, Georgia.

== Awards and honors ==
- 2005: The Star Award from the Fashion Group International of New York
- 2006: The Artistry of Fashion Award from The Couture Council of The Museum at FIT
- 2008: The Fashion Design Award of the National Design Awards Program of the Cooper-Hewitt National Design Museum
- 2008: A Doctor of Philosophy degree honoris causa from the San Francisco Academy of Art University
- 2009: The Pratt Institute Icon Award.
- 2011: The first Visionary Award for Fashion from the Philadelphia International Festival of the Arts
- 2011: Inducted into the Fashion Group International International Walk of Fame
- 2012: The Andre' Leon Talley Lifetime Achievement Award from SCAD
- 2015: Honorary Doctoral Degree from Drexel University College of Art and Design
