= Olivia Putman =

French designer (born 1964)

- Born: 1964 (age 61–62); Paris, France
- Education: University of La Sorbonne Paris; art history; landscape architecture
- Occupation: Interior Design Design Scenography landscape architecture
- Organization: Studio Putman
- Children: 4
- Parent: Andrée Putman (mother)
- Website: studioputman.com

Olivia Putman (born 1964) is a French designer, daughter to Andrée Putman and heir to her mother's design studio, Studio Putman. Her works range from interior architecture to scenography and design.

== Biography ==
Olivia Putman grew up in Paris with her mother, Andrée Putman, a designer, and her father Jacques Putman, an art collector, editor and critic. Through family acquaintances and her teenage nights at Le Palace, she got to meet the most eclectic figures of the artistic scene of those days, including Andy Warhol and Yves Saint-Laurent.

== Career ==
After graduating from high school, Olivia completed a bachelor's degree in art history in 1987, at the Paris-Sorbonne University. She then divided her time and workspace between Paris and New York. She became the agent of the Ivorian painter Ouattara Watts, and she befriended with Jean-Michel Basquiat, whom she counted among her friends until he died.

In 1988, for the first time, she becomes an exhibition curator. Thanks to her friend Leo Castelli, she exhibits pieces from Jasper Johns or Mario Merz in Paris.

This first exhibition gained Putman popularity and she started working with the association Usines Ephémères, which converts disused urban spaces into artist studios.

=== Landscape architecture (1994-2006) ===
In 1994, she created temporary gardens combining art and agriculture with Jean-Paul Ganem. At this stage, Olivia was an active artist and started studying landscape management.

In 1997, Olivia Putman started as a freelancer and flew to Japan to design her first private garden. Public acknowledgement of her talent only took a few years. Her work for Parfums Caron was awarded the Dream Garden Prize at the Garden Festival of Saint-Cloud in 2000 and she also designed a private garden for Marc Jacobs in Paris.

=== Studio Putman, from mother to daughter (since 2007) ===
In 2007, Olivia Putman agrees to take the art direction of the Andrée Putman's agency, a long-standing desire of the founder. The Andrée Putman agency becomes "Studio Putman." Olivia Putman keeps a taste for challenging adventures that combine pleasure and innovation, and that articulate creative ideals with concrete reality.

Putman's design practice spans luxury hotels, offices, and private residences, with an emphasis on balancing aesthetic refinement with functional considerations. She has also designed high-end furniture produced in collaboration with French craftsmen. In 2015, she was awarded the "Best Design" prize in Los Angeles for her Métamorphoses tap collection. Her work additionally includes set design for exhibitions, with collaborations alongside brands and studios such as Lalique, Nina Ricci, and Herzog & de Meuron.

=== Interior design ===
- 2007 - Morgans Hotel, New York
- 2009 - "The Rivage" hotel, Hong Kong
- 2011 - Public Works' headquarters on Champs-Elysées, Paris
- 2013 - Studio Putman won in collaboration with Lilian Allen and Mathias Klotz an international competition to design new VIP lounges for LATAM Airways. The first lounges opened in the airports of Buenos Aires and Bogota
- 2013 - Hotel Sofitel Arc de Triomphe, Paris
- 2014 - Hotel Can Faustino on the island of Menorca, Spain
- 2014 - VIP lounge for LATAM Airways in São Paulo, Brazil
- 2015 - VIP lounge, (biggest airport's lounge in South America), Santiago, Chile
- 2016 - Interior design for a 58 Meters motor yacht
- 2017 - Euromed Center, Marseille
- 2018 - Lagardère Headquarters, France
- 2018 - Villas for Hotel Christopher, Saint Barthélémy

=== Scenography ===
- 2009 - Scenography for the Madeleine Vionnet exhibition at the Musée des Arts Décoratifs, Paris (Paris' Museum of Decorative Arts)
- 2009 - Scenography for the shows of Christophe (singer) at the Olympia, Paris.
- 2010 - Olivia Putman is, with Sebastien Grandin, curator of the exhibition "Andrée Putman, ambassador of style" at Paris City Hall (250,000 visitors)
- 2013 - Olivia Putman is the ambassador of French creation at the Ambiente Fair in Frankfurt. For this event, she designed spaces symbolizing the art of French living.
- 2013 - Exhibition "Le Temps des Collections" at the Musée des Beaux-Arts de Rouen (Rouen's Museum of Fine Arts)
- 2014 - During the "French May" event in Hong Kong, Olivia Putman presents two exhibitions about Studio Putman in PMQ and in The Landmark (Hong Kong)

=== Design ===
"I believe that we live in a time where people are fed up with "design for design". Design is successful when you have the right answer for its purpose", says Olivia Putman

- 2008 - "Rive Gauche" chair for Drucker
- 2010 - Olivia Putman wins the Nespresso contest and creates the "Ritual" Collection
- 2011 - Collection "Inside Out" for Fermob
- 2011 - Olivia Putman becomes the Artistic Director of Lalique and creates the "Orgue" Collection
- 2011 - Collection "Belle Etoile" for Serralunga
- 2012 - Fabric collection for Pierre Frey
- 2012 - "Jour de Fête" collection for Charles Paris
- 2013 - Olivia Putman gives her own interpretation of the Nina Ricci's « Air du Temps » perfume bottle
- 2013 - The "O" tap collection for THG
- 2013 - "Contrast" collection for Made.com
- 2013 - Creation of a cognac bottle and its box for Hine
- 2014 - « Time Flies » collection for the Ralph Pucci Gallery, New York
- 2014 - « Dialogues » furniture collection, for the "French May" festival, Hong-Kong
- 2015 - « Métamorphose » collection for THG, best design award for he "BD WEST" fair in Los Angeles
- 2018 - Outdoor furniture collection for Fiminco

=== Awards ===
2000 - "Jardin de Rêve" Prize (Dream garden Prize) at the "Festival des Jardins" of Saint-Cloud. Olivia Putman imagined a garden for the Parfums Caron

2009 - Olivia Putman wins the Nespresso contest

2012 - Olivia Putman wins the LATAM Airways contest et and creates VIP lounges in South America

2015 - Best Design Award for the THG collection at the "BD West" Fair, Los Angeles

== Personal ==
Olivia Putman has four children, Julien, Noé, Carl and Louis.
