= Andrée Putman =

French interior and product designer (1925-2013)

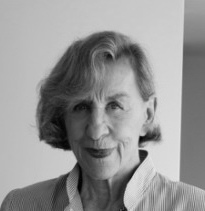
- Andrée Putman
- Born: Andrée Christine Aynard; 23 December 1925; Paris, France
- Died: 19 January 2013 (aged 87); Paris, France
- Known for: Architecture, design, scenography
- Notable work: Interior Design, Furniture, Private residences, Museums, Hotels, Restaurants, Spas, Ministers, Concept stores, scenography for exhibitions and movies
- Awards: Chevalier de la légion d'honneur, Officier des arts et belles lettres
- Website: studioputman.com/en/

Andrée Putman (23 December 1925 – 19 January 2013) was a French interior and product designer.

== Life and work ==
=== Childhood and youth (1925–1944) ===
Andrée Christine Aynard was born into a wealthy family of bankers and notables from Lyon. Her paternal grandfather, Edouard Aynard, founded the Maynard & Sons Bank; her paternal grandmother, Rose de Montgolfier, was a descendant of the hot-air balloon inventors' family. Her father was a graduate from the prestigious Ecole Normale Supérieure who spoke seven languages but swore to a life of austerity and seclusion to protest against his own milieu; her mother, Louise Saint-René Taillandier, was a concert pianist who found comfort in the frivolity of "being a great artist without a stage."

Her formal artistic education first came, however, through music. Her mother took her and her sister to concerts and urged them to learn the piano. But she was later told that her hands were not suited to the piano and, as a consequence, she would never be a virtuoso. She then switched her focus to studying composition at the National Conservatory of Paris. At the age of nineteen, she received the First Harmony Prize of the Conservatory from Francis Poulenc himself. On that occasion, he told her that at least 10 more years of unremitting work and ascetic life would be necessary before she could—maybe—aspire to a career as a composer. Picturing herself living like a Carmelite nun at the Fontenay Abbey, she cut short the musical career she had undertaken as a tribute to her mother. Putman decided to satisfy her curiosity and creative instincts another way.

She was the mother of Olivia Putman and of Cyrille Putman.

=== Professional beginnings (1945–1978) ===
At the age of 20 she had a serious bike accident, which she barely survived. Her characteristic posture stemmed from this event: she was a tall woman who stood straight and walked as if on a tightrope. Soon after the accident, she broke free from her initial career in music and from the illusion of safety her social environment offered her and decided to discover the world. One day, she emptied her bedroom and furnished it with just a hard iron bed, a chair and a Miró poster on the white walls. This early expression of her desire of independence led to a confrontation with her family who wondered "if she realises the sorrow she makes them feel?"

"What can one do when one did not go to school and is a musician who stopped playing music?", she asked her maternal grandmother, Madeleine Saint-René Taillandier. "Nothing except messenger," was the reply. Taking her grandmother's advice, Andrée started working as a messenger for Femina magazine. While taking care of all the dirty little jobs of the office, she observed with a sharp eye the social theatre which takes place during meetings. She worked for Elle and L'Oeil, a prestigious art magazine where the still-lives she imagined with objects of various styles and from different periods attracted attention. She identified what is sophisticated and innovative, widened her knowledge of designers... and walked by the Café de Flore every day. "We could see Antonin Artaud, Juliette Gréco, Giacometti, Sartre and Simone de Beauvoir… People who looked free and were emancipated from conventions."

These first jobs allowed Andrée to meet artists, characters more familiar to her than intellectuals. At the time, she was not confident enough to fully express herself. She therefore stayed in the background rather to put the talents of others in the limelight, something for which she showed great talent since she was raised in an artistically-rich environment. Personally knowing what it is to "be trapped into the beaten tracks", she was moved by "people whose work is not understood", "impressed by these artists who do not look for anything else but remaining in the depth of their sincerity, their risk", she only wished to help them and establish a connection between them and the rest of the world. In the late 1950s, Andrée Aynard married Jacques Putman, an art critic, collector and publisher. Together they associated with artists such as Pierre Alechinsky, Bram van Velde, Alberto Giacometti and Niki de Saint Phalle.

In 1958, Putman collaborated with the retail chain Prisunic as Art Director of the Home Department, where her motto was to "design beautiful things for nothing". Her wish of making art available to a larger public also became a reality through Prisunic as she organised with her husband editions of lithographs by famous artists sold for only 100 Francs (1,73 €). In 1968, she distinguished herself in the style agency Mafia until Didier Grumbach spotted her in 1971 and hired her to start a new company which was aimed at developing the textile industry: Créateurs & Industriels. Her intuition led her to reveal many talented designers such as Jean-Charles de Castelbajac, Issey Miyake, Ossie Clark, Claude Montana and Thierry Mugler. It is at that moment that she went into interior design as she converted the former SNCF premises into a showroom and offices for the company.

=== Ecart (1978–1995) ===
In the late 1970s, Créateurs & Industriels went bankrupt; Putman got divorced. She tried to materialise her intense feeling of emptiness: at the time she lived in a room furnished with only a bed and two lamps "in total austerity, because I no longer knew what I liked." Taking her friend Michel Guy's advice, she decided to found Ecart (which backwards is Trace). It is therefore at the age of 53 that Andrée Putman really started the career which made her famous from Hong Kong to New York. She started by giving life again to forgotten designers from the 1930s: René Herbst, Jean-Michel Frank, Pierre Chareau, Robert Mallet-Stevens, Gaudi, Eileen Gray... "My only concern was to interest at least ten persons and I would have accomplished something which would carry me for all my life." These pieces of furniture won over not ten, but thousands of people. From releasing furniture to designing interiors, the evolution of activity came quite naturally. took the next logical step: "I loathe pompous luxury. I take interest in the essential, the framework, the basic elements of things."

The interior design of the Morgans Hotel in New York in 1984 marked a turning point in Andrée Putman's career: she managed to make a high-standard hotel with a small budget and asserted her style with sober rooms and visual effects. "Because I started working in New York, the French suddenly asked for me." From the 1980s, she led more and more interior design projects: hotels such as Le Lac in Japan, Im Wasserturm in Germany and the Sheraton in Roissy-Charles de Gaulle airport in Paris; stores for Azzedine Alaia, Balenciaga, Bally and Lagerfeld; offices, particularly the one for French Minister of Culture Jack Lang in 1984; and museums like the CAPC, Bordeaux's contemporary art museum. Designed private VIP rouge "Orchid Club" at Orchid Court, Premium resident with architect Charles Moore in Japan Kobe city.

=== The Andrée Putman Studio (1997–present) ===
In 1997, Andrée Putman created her eponymous Studio, specialising in interior design, product design and scenography. When she imagined objects, she refused the excess of striving to re-design pieces which were perfectly designed by others in the past. "We have to accept that many things can no longer be changed – or very slightly. If we change them, we have to add humour, detachment. What interests me: a joke in a collection, a sign of complicity." For example, when she began collaborating with Christofle in 2000, she designed a collection of silver cutlery, objects and jewellery named Vertigo. The common element of this collection was a slightly twisted ring: "the fact that this ring is twisted brings life to it: did it fall? Why is it asymmetrical? Life is made of imperfections."She created a Champagne bucket for Veuve Clicquot and reinterpreted the iconic Louis Vuitton Steamer Bag. In 2001, Putman created "Préparation Parfumée". In 2003, she launched her own line of furniture "Préparation meublée" where the pieces were ironically named "Croqueuse de diamants", "Jeune bûcheron", "Bataille d'oreillers"... ("Gold digger", "Young lumberjack" and "Pillow fight"). In 2004, she creates a stunning Russian tea set for Gien: Polka. An interior designer, she carried out the projects for Pershing Hall in Paris, the Morgans Hotel in Manhattan, and the Blue Spa at the Hotel Bayerischer Hof in Munich. In 2005, Guerlain chooses the Studio Putman to re-design its flagship store on the Champs Elysées. Among notable private commissions are the Pagoda House in Tel Aviv, the vast SoHo penthouse for Serge and Tatiana Sorokko, and a cliff-house in Tangier for Bernard-Henri Lévy and Arielle Dombasle, for whom Putman completely restructured the building.

In 2007, a new era began as Andrée's daughter Olivia Putman agreed to take over the Art Direction of the Studio, a wish its founder had expressed for a long time. "We realised that time and Andrée's fame had turned our family name into an adjective. Qualified in History of Art and landscape architecture, Olivia wishes to perpetuate the eclecticism and curiosity her mother always claimed." In 2008, Paris Mayor Bertand Delanoë made Andrée President of the first Paris Design Committee, which aims at rethinking street furniture, Parisian public equipments and employees' uniforms. That same year, she presented Voie Lactée ("Milky Way"), the grand piano she designed for France's oldest piano manufacturer Pleyel and unveiled Entrevue, her creation for Bisazza at the Salone del Mobile in Milan. In June, the store she designed for fashion designer Anne Fontaine in New York was inaugurated, following the ones designed in Paris and Tokyo.

The following year, Andrée and Olivia present the chair they designed for the American firm Emeco, a line of sunglasses for RAC Paris, a collection of carpets for Toulemonde Bochart, a knife for the Forge de Laguiole, as well as furniture for Fermob and Silvera. The Studio was also called upon to imagine the scenography for French singer Christophe's concerts at the Olympia and at Versailles, and the Madeleine Vionnet exhibition at the Musée des Arts Décoratifs in Paris. In October 2009, a new monograph dedicated to Andrée Putman's career is published by Rizzoli Editions. In 2010, Paris' City Hall paid tribute to Andrée Putman by hosting a great exhibition about her life, for which Olivia is curator. The event Andrée Putman, ambassador of style attracted more than 250,000 visitors.

=== Death ===
Putman died at her apartment in the sixth arrondissement of Paris, on 19 January 2013, aged 87.

=== Awards ===
- 2009 – Best designer, voted by 4000 journalists
- 2008 – Chevalier of the Order of the Legion of Honour, Officier of the Ordre des Arts et des Lettres, Paris, France
- 2006 – Gala Spa Award Für Bayerischer Hof, Baden-Baden, Germany
- 2005 – 1er Prix Veuve Clicquot de la Femme d'Affaires, Veuve Clicquot prize for her whole career
- 2002 – Der Feinschmecker (allemagne) Hotel of the Year Award
  - Nº 1 Ritz-Carlton, Wolfsburg
  - Nº 3 Im Wassertum, Cologne
- 2001 – IIda Star Award, Chicago, USA
- 1999 – Modernism Design Award for Lifetime Achievement Brooklyn Museum of Art, New York USA
- 1998 – Honorary Doctor of Fine Arts Degree, the School of the Art Institute of Chicago. Chicago, USA
- 1997 – Stars of the Design Award, for the work of a lifetime in Interior Design. Pacific Design Center, Westweek 97. Los Angeles, USA
- 1996 – Honorary Doctor of Fine Arts Degree, Parsons School of Design, New York City
- 1996 – The Good Design Award, for industrial products sold worldwide, awarded by the Chicago Athenaeum, Museum of Architecture and Design, Chicago, USA
- 1996 – Business Traveller Award,, Sheraton Aéroport de Paris – Best New Hotel in the World, awarded by Carlson Wagonlit
- 1995 – Grand Prix National de la Creation Industrielle, given by Monsieur Philippe Douste-Blazy, Ministre de la Culture, Paris, France
- 1995 – Blenheim Jewelry Display Award, Jewelers of America International – Jewelry exhibited in New York. Best Stand Award, New York, USA
- 1993 – Oscar du design, sponsored by the French business magazine Nouvel Economiste, Prestige Award for the Morgans Hotel Collection, Paris, France
- 1992 – Prix Crystal Award d'Excellence en Design given by the American Society of Interior Designers, San Francisco Museum of Modern Art, San Francisco, USA
- 1991 – Prix Europeen d'architecture d'interieur, for the category Hotels and restaurants for the Hotel in Wasserturm (in Cologne), Amsterdam, Netherlands
- Grand Prix Europeen d'architecture d'interieur, for her career (for the category Hotels and restaurants, offices, entertainment and theaters, stores)

== Sources ==
- Donald Albrecht, Andrée Putman, preface by Jean Nouvel Paris, Editions Rizzoli, 2009 (ISBN 978-0-8478-3375-7)
- Studio Andrée Putman's website studioputman.com
- Stéphane Gerschel, Le Style Putman, Paris, Assouline, 2005 (ISBN 978-2843236686)
- Andrée Putman, preface by Jack Lang, Architecte d'intérieur n°17, Paris, Pyramid, 2003 (ISBN 978-2910565558)
- Sophie Tasma-Anagyros, Andrée Putman, Paris, Éditions Norma, 1997 (ISBN 978-2909283289)
- François-Olivier Rousseau, Andrée Putman, Paris, Éditions du Regard, 1991 (ISBN 978-2903370480)
- Michèle Lécluse, Andrée Putman, Clin d'œil, Une collection pour Litton Furniture, Paris, Couleurs Contemporaines, Les Cahiers, Bernard Chauveau Editeur, 2008, (ISBN 9782915837339)
- Andrée Putman, Ambassadrice du style, Skira Flammarion, Paris 2010. (ISBN 9782081246348)
