= James Galanos =

American fashion designer of Greek descent (1924–2016)

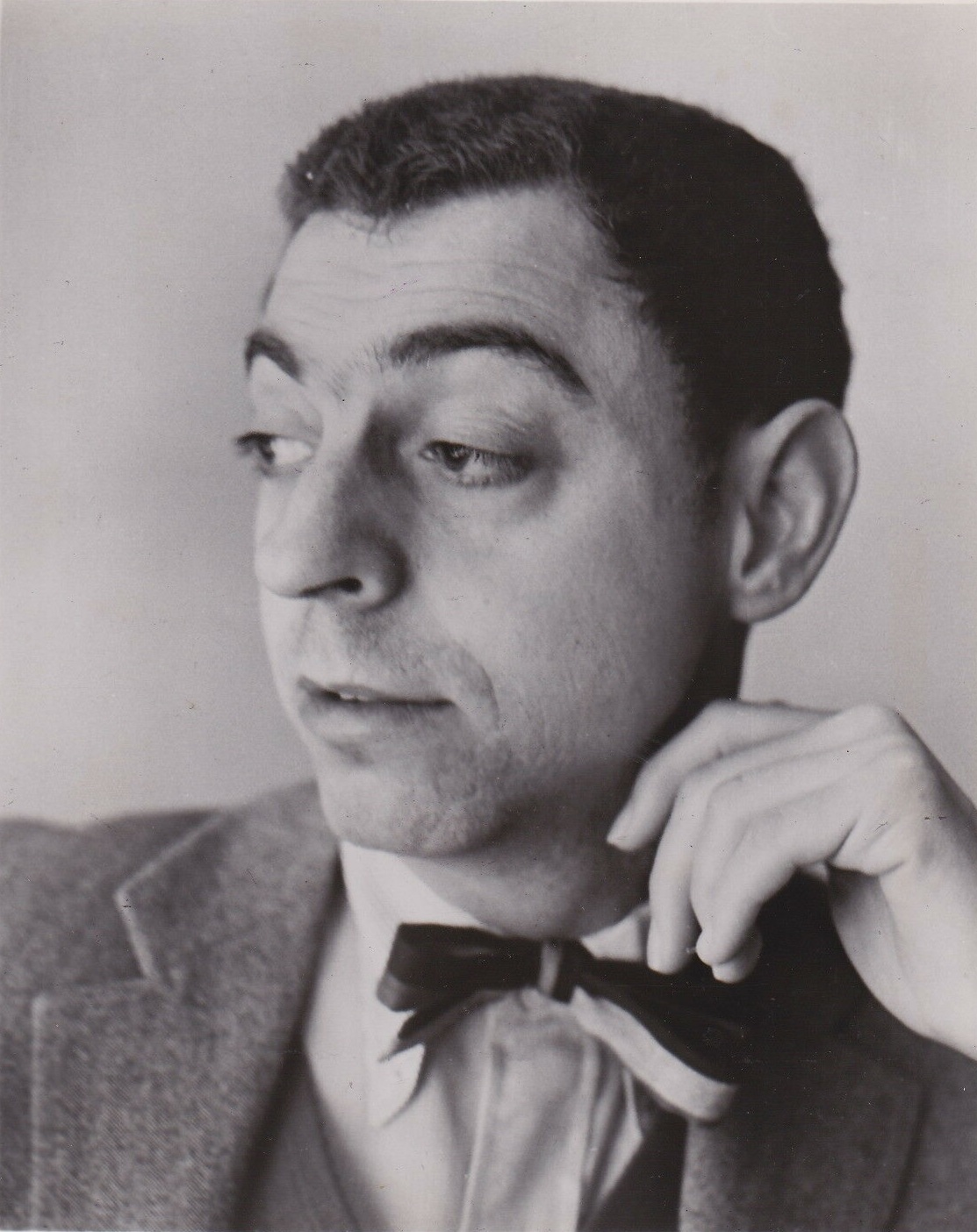
- Galanos in 1956
- Born: September 20, 1924; Philadelphia, Pennsylvania, US
- Died: October 30, 2016 (aged 92); West Hollywood, California, US
- Education: Traphagen School of Design, New York
- Labels: Galanos; Parfums Galanos; Galanos Furs
- Awards: List: Coty American Fashion Critics award, 1954, 1956, 1959; Neiman Marcus award, Dallas, 1954; Filene's Young Talent Design award, Boston, 1958; Cotton Fashion award, 1958; Coty American Hall of Fame award, 1959; Crystal Ball Award from The Fashion Group of Philadelphia, 1963; Drexel Institute of Technology, 1965; Sunday Times International Award, London, 1968; Los Angeles Chamber of Commerce Golden 44 Award, 1980; FiFi award for Parfums Galanos, New York, 1980; Universita delle Arte Terme Diploma di Merita, Italy, 1981; Council of Fashion Designers of America Lifetime Achievement award, 1985; Stanley Award, 1986; Inducted, Fashion Walk of Fame, Seventh Avenue, New York, 2001; Received, Doctor of Philosophy degree honoris causa, San Francisco Academy of Art University, 2008

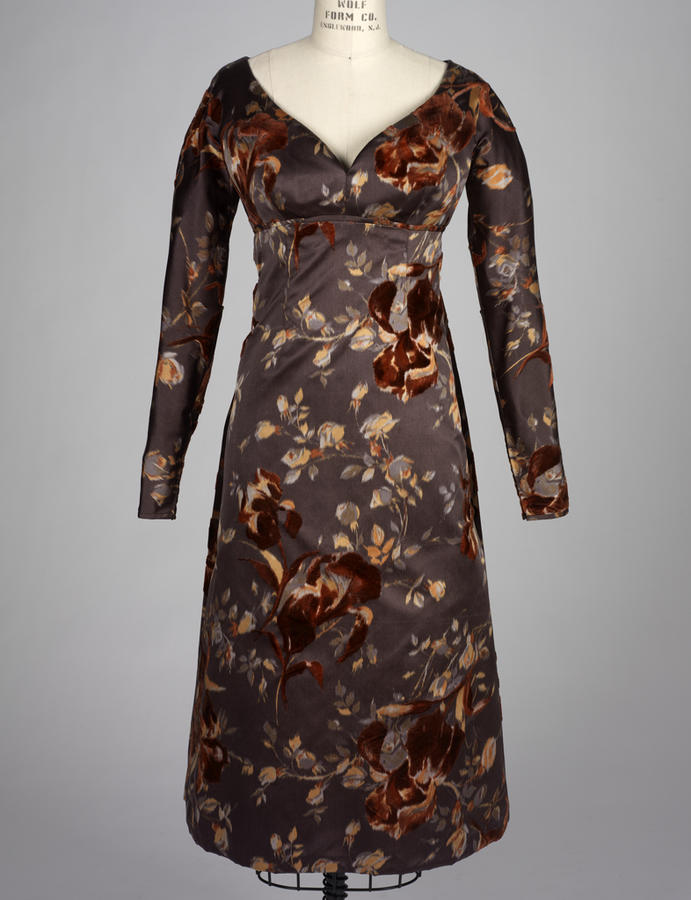
1959 James Galanos cocktail dress, warp-printed silk satin and velvet. (RISD Museum)

James Galanos (/ˈɡælənoʊs/; September 20, 1924 – October 30, 2016) was an American fashion designer and couturier. Galanos is known for designing clothing for America's social elite, including Nancy Reagan, Marilyn Monroe, Elizabeth Taylor, and others.

== Early life ==
Galanos was born on September 20, 1924, in Philadelphia, Pennsylvania, the only son of Greek-born parents. His mother, Helen Gorgoliatos, and his father, Gregory Galanos, a frustrated artist, ran a restaurant in southern New Jersey, where Galanos had his first glimpses of well-dressed women. He grew up a shy boy and learned to work hard from an early age. Galanos recalled that he was "a loner, surrounded by three sisters. I never sewed; I just sketched. It was simply instinctive. As a young boy I had no fashion influences around me but all the while I was dreaming of Paris and New York." Galanos graduated from Bridgeton High School in Bridgeton, New Jersey in 1942. After graduating high school, he went to New York City intending to enroll at a school headed by Barbara Karinska, the Russian stage designer and costumer.

When the school failed to open in the autumn, he enrolled at the Traphagen School of Fashion, one of the first schools of its kind. He attended two semesters at Traphagen, the first spent in general design studies and the second in draping and construction. After eight months, in 1943, Galanos left the school because he felt that what he wanted to learn could only be acquired from practical experience in the garment industry.

== Career ==
=== 1944 – mid-1950s ===
In 1944, Galanos got a position as a general assistant at the New York East 49th Street emporium of Hattie Carnegie, the incubator of such talents as Jean Louis, Pauline Trigère, and Norman Norell. His job there turned out to be more clerical than creative, and, disappointed, Galanos left Carnegie and began selling his sketches to individual manufacturers on Seventh Avenue for less than ten dollars per sketch. Then, in 1945, his former Traphagen style and fashion teacher Elisabeth Rorabach called his attention to a help-wanted ad she had seen in The New York Times, placed by textile magnate Lawrence Lesavoy. "His beautiful wife, Joan, was hoping to launch a ready-to-wear dress business in California, and they were looking for a designer," recalled Galanos. The Lesavoys employed him for $75.00 a week and dispatched him to Los Angeles. Their plan, however, did not materialize; the Lesavoys divorced, and Galanos lost his job. "Out of pity," Galanos said, Jean Louis, head costume designer at Columbia Pictures, hired him as a part-time assistant sketch artist. Soon afterward, Lawrence Lesavoy agreed to send the 24-year-old Galanos to Paris, just as couture houses there were rebounding from the war. Couturier Robert Piguet absorbed the American into his stable of assistants, among whom were Pierre Balmain, Hubert de Givenchy, and Marc Bohan. At the Piguet atelier, Galanos met with fabric and trimming suppliers to choose materials, sketched and draped up designs under the eye of Piguet, who oversaw his work on a daily basis. In 1948, Galanos decided to return to the U.S. and accepted a job with Davidow, a dress-making firm in New York. The new job allowed him very little creativity, and he resigned shortly.

In 1952, James Galanos opened his own company, Galanos Originals, which was immediately ordered by Saks Fifth Avenue and Neiman Marcus in Beverly Hills. He then opened his New York showroom where a Neiman Marcus clothing buyer discovered him and predicted his styles would soon "set the world on fire." Stanley Marcus, the president of Neiman Marcus, agreed and soon proclaimed that the greatest and most treasured luxury in the world for a woman to have would be a dress by James Galanos. Legendary magazine editors and style arbiters such as Diana Vreeland, Eleanor Lambert, Gloria Vanderbilt, and Eugenia Sheppard became fans, ensuring that he would become a household name within months. From this first collection, his clothing has been admired for its particularly high quality, especially considering it was ready-to-wear, not custom-made. His chiffon dresses, in particular, made his reputation in the early 1950s, with their yards of meticulously hand-rolled edges. Many designers worked with chiffon, but Galanos was a true master of the genre. He draped chiffon, pleated it, layered it, used flower prints and fabrics with metallic glints. As tailored as a shirtwaist dress or as seductive as a sarong, he gave chiffon a high style all his own. Sometimes he even gilded it, as in his notable pin-striped dress with a three-dimensional jeweled butterfly embroidered on the chest.

In 1953, Galanos embarked on another venture altogether – he began designing for movies. His first job was to create costumes for Rosalind Russell, the star of the forthcoming film "Never Wave at a WAC." Russell, who at that time was considered the best-dressed of all American actresses, loved Galanos' designs, and she became his friend and a loyal client. Galanos went on to design costumes for other Russell's movies, most notably the film version of Oh Dad, Poor Dad, Mamma's Hung You in the Closet and I'm Feelin' So Sad in 1967. After her death, Miss Russell's wardrobe – nearly all of it Galanos – was divided among a number of costume collections across the country as gifts in her memory from her husband, Frederick Brisson. Other Galanos' contributions to film and performing arts included costume designs for Judy Garland for General Electric Theater and Judy Garland Musical Special, both in 1956, as well as the 1974 film Ginger in the Morning, starring Sissy Spacek.

=== Mid-1950s – 1998 ===
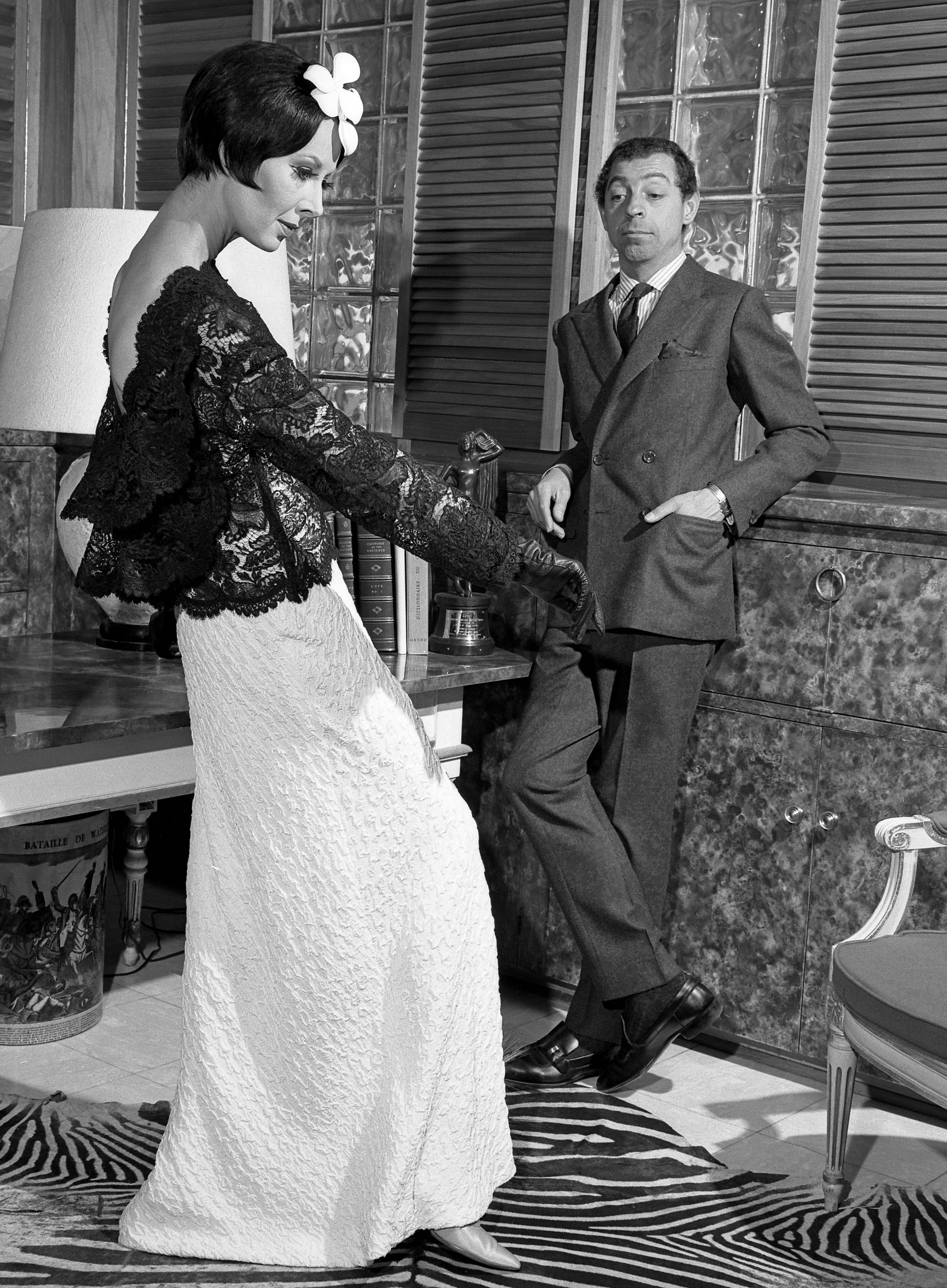
James Galanos with a model wearing one of his gowns, 1965

Galanos gathered some of the most talented craftsmen available in his workrooms; many were trained in Europe or in the costume studios of Hollywood, for whom he continued to design from time to time. Nondas Keramitsis, Galanos' head tailor, moved to Los Angeles from his native Greece to make women's clothing. He had heard about Galanos through relatives and soon started working with him in his Los Angeles studio. Keramitsis and a crew of about 22 tailors he oversaw made everything by hand. If Galanos' work was compared to that of anyone else, it was compared to French haute couture. His business was more comparable to a couture house than a ready-to-wear manufacturer; there was a great amount of hand work in each garment, and all of his famous beadwork and embroidery was done by his staff.

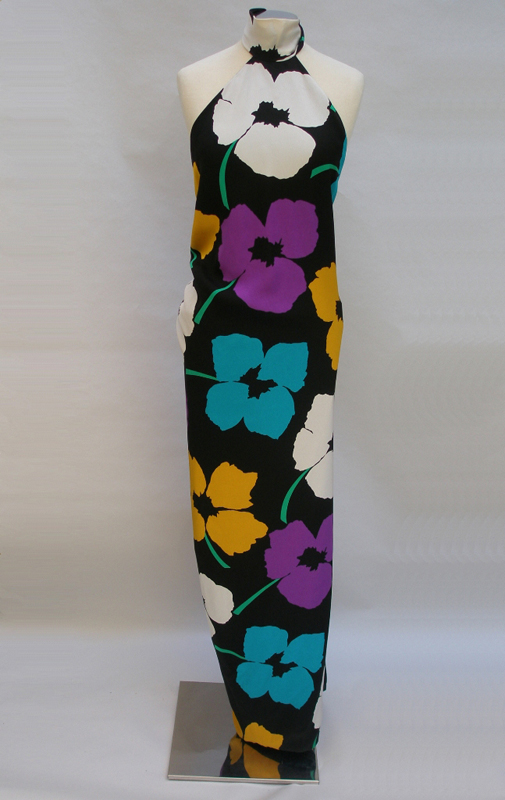
James Galanos halter floral full length gown. New York 1980s. PFF collection, Nafplion

Galanos always chose fabrics and trimmings personally during trips to Europe and Asia. Though he constantly looked for the best fabrics, Galanos often felt compelled to create his own. So he would make jackets out of different colored ribbons to toss over his chiffon dresses in impressionist colors. Or he would cross black satin ribbons over black lace for the bodices of delicately frothy short evening dresses. He often lined his dresses with silks that other designers used for dresses themselves, and he was always a firm believer in the importance of hidden details. These details made a difference in the feel of the clothes on the body and the hang of the fabric, and his clients all over the world were willing to pay a great deal for them. Details that were not hidden included sequins, feathers, metallic brocades, and laces. He often balanced his most glittering dresses with quiet tie-dyed velvet sheaths and long, clingy styles in black crepe or crushed velvet. "Galanos: Perfection, and Lots of It," read the headline in The New York Times after Galanos' show of some 200 designs in 1988. "While he travels to Europe for his fabrics – many are the same as those used in the Paris couture collections – most of Galanos's designing is done in California," reported the Times. "His standards are as high as those found anywhere in the world. If a comparison is made, it is usually with the Paris couture. It is reasonably astonishing that an American designer of ready-to-wear should merit that kind of homage over so long a period of time." Fashion designer Gustave Tassell, a long-time friend of Galanos, recalls an occasion when Hubert de Givenchy, the illustrious French couturier, was looking at an inside of a Galanos garment and exclaimed "... we don't make them this well in Paris!" It was precisely this couture quality and the timelessness of Galanos' designs that caused his clients to never part with their gowns and continue wearing them over many years. But it was also the price tag. "Nobody could afford to dress completely with Jimmy," Nancy Reagan once confessed. "I hang on to what I have."

Galanos was also famous for his exquisite furs. He used mainly mink, sable, lynx, and broadtail and handled the furs imaginatively as if they were fabric. He smocked and quilted the surfaces, nipped the waistlines and used drawstrings, ruffles, and capelets to give a strong fashion slant to all that opulence. He often designed for Peter Dion, the furrier who made sure that the quality of the pelts and the workmanship supported the innovative design. At the top of the line were coats made of lynx bellies, so soft and fluffy they looked airborne. The short style was selling for $200,000, the long one – for $300,000. The fitted coat was a Galanos specialty, successful in almost any fur, including fox. As he did with his ready-to-wear, Galanos also made the hats and other accessories, which included short fur scarves with mink tails hanging from the ends. He showed his coats over stretch tights and bodysuits with satin surfaces. There were unexpected styles as well, like fur shorts, gathered down the sides. Many sleeves featured the smock quilting that became a Galanos signature. He also had a special feeling for broadtail, the tissue-thin fur with a sleek, elegant surface. But Galanos could also make soft mink coats look lean, willowy and graceful by the way he shaped the skins in the back or carved the hemline in a back-dipping curve. According to Bernardine Morris of the New York Times, Galanos' "best design is a slender coat with the skins worked vertically through the bodice and horizontally for the skirt, an example of elegant proportioning."

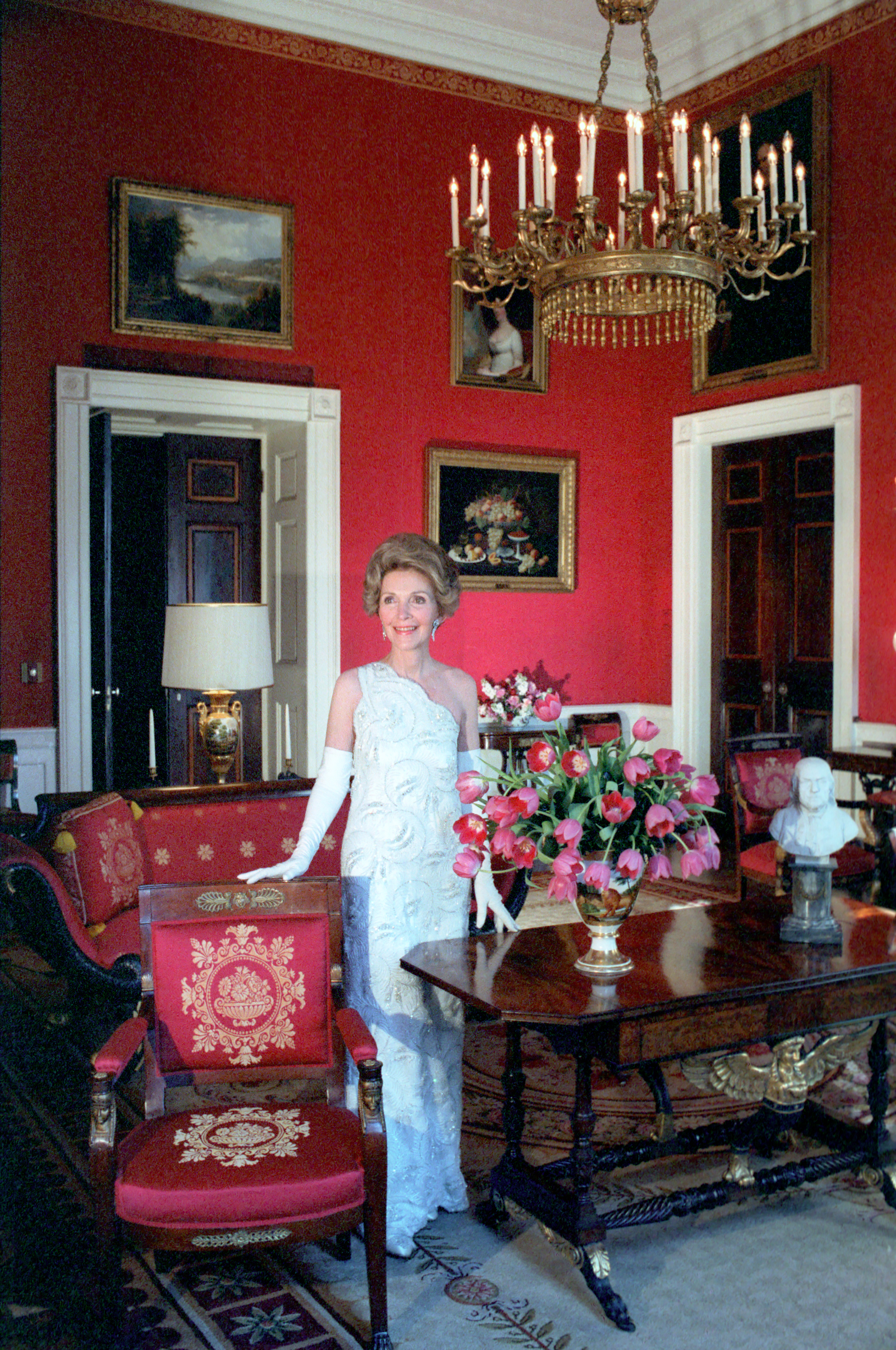
First Lady Nancy Reagan in the Inaugural gown by James Galanos models for Vogue magazine in the Red Room, 1981

Many of the world's most socially prominent women were Galanos customers. "James Galanos designs for wealthy women who go to luncheons and cocktail parties, dine at the finest restaurants and are invited to the best parties," reported The New York Times. "His clothes are rarely seen in business offices. It isn't only because of the five-figure price tags, although they are daunting to all but the highest-paid executives. It's also the glamour quotient of the clothes." Galanos agreed, "I design for a very limited group of people," he told Time magazine in 1985. In the 1980s, he made national headlines as First Lady Nancy Reagan's favorite designer. Reagan first met Galanos in 1951 at a boutique in Beverly Hills. At the time, Reagan was working as an actress in Hollywood. She wore dresses created by Galanos to Ronald Reagan's first inaugural ball as governor of California in 1967, and again in 1971 and 1981. The fact that Mrs. Reagan wore a 16-year-old Galanos gown to her first state dinner at the White House attested to the timelessness and durability not only of his workmanship, but more importantly, of his design.

This type of occurrence was commonplace among his faithful customers, who included Marilyn Monroe, Elizabeth Taylor, Jackie Kennedy, Lady Bird Johnson, Grace Kelly, Diana Ross, Betsy Bloomingdale, Rosalind Russell, Marlene Dietrich, Dorothy Lamour, Judy Garland, Loretta Young, Ali MacGraw, Ivana Trump, Carolyne Roehm, Kim Basinger, Arianna Huffington and many other notable personalities and film and media stars. In 1982, John Duka, the New York Times columnist, described in his column, Notes on Fashion, a black tie party in Galanos' honor attended by his A-list fans, "James Galanos, the designer whose clothing is unmatched in quality and price in this country, was in town, and almost immediately the level of social exchange seemed elevated as if by ripple effect. Betsy and Michael Kaiser – he is the photographer – gave a black tie buffet dinner for the designer Saturday. Among those at table were Lyn Revson, Gordon Parks, Barbara Walters, Arianna Stassinopoulos, former Senator Abraham A. Ribicoff and his wife, Casey, Freddie and Arlette Brisson, Mary McFadden, Tammy Grimes, Stephen Paley, John Loring, Gloria Vanderbilt, William Macomber, Sybilla Clark, Alex Gregory, Frank and Gloria Schiff and Bob Colacello. Mr. Galanos was the center of attention: Almost every woman in the room was wearing one of his designs."

=== 1998 – 2016 ===
In 1998, Galanos retired after a career spanning nearly five decades. Despite his retirement, Galanos continued to make his presence known in the fashion world. In 2002, he blasted the fashion industry for catering to only young women with perfect bodies. In an interview with WWD over lunch at the Pierre Hotel in New York he asked the reporter, Eric Wilson, shaking his head in contempt, "How many women can wear just a patch over their crotch and a bra? Aren't you embarrassed when you see a young girl walking down the street practically naked? Fashion is geared only to young people today," Galanos continued. "All we see is Levi's and bare bellies to the point of nausea. There are no clothes for elegant women. Let's face it, some of the things you see in the paper are absolutely monstrous looking – and I'm not squeamish. God knows I made sexy clothes in my day, but there's a point when you have to say, 'Enough, already'."

Of contemporary designers, he admired the work of Ralph Rucci, who shares Galanos' views of the state of fashion at the beginning of the new millennium. "I think we're in a state of mediocrity," Rucci told design students at the San Francisco Academy of Art University. Beginning in the early 2000s, Galanos attended most of Rucci's shows in New York and Paris. "I thought what he was doing was really terrific," Galanos told Cathy Horyn of The New York Times in 2002, "he has the same kind of concept that I had – beautiful details that you don't see in ready-to-wear." "Ralph Rucci makes clothes like no one else, taking pains to make things that are beautifully finished," he told Harper's Bazaar in 2004. On his side, Rucci considers Galanos a major influence in his work and a continuing inspiration. "If we were in Japan, we'd have an expression and call [Galanos] our national living treasure," Rucci told a group of distinguished guests that included Nancy Reagan, Betsy Bloomingdale and Peggy Moffitt, at an event honoring Galanos at the Beverly Wilshire Hotel in Beverly Hills.

"While he officially retired in 1998," wrote Alix Browne in The New York Times, "he shows no signs of falling out of fashion." Galanos's vintage gowns remain chic, sought after and popular among the international jet-set, Hollywood stars and supermodels, and have been seen on such notable women as Celine Dion, Renée Zellweger, Nicole Kidman, Jessica Alba, Heidi Klum, Tatiana Sorokko, Amber Valletta, Christina Ricci, Ashley Olsen and Katie Holmes.

=== Photography ===
Having reinvented himself as an abstract photographer, in 2006, at age 82, Galanos's first exhibition of photography was held to great acclaim at the Serge Sorokko Gallery in San Francisco. The show featured more than 40 photographs taken by Galanos over the previous several years. The works were mostly abstract, with the notable exception of a few mystical, mirror-effect enigmatic landscapes. Much like fashion design, his photography revolved around material, shape and color. The subjects were crafted by Galanos out of paper or fabric and then photographed in evocative light, creating subtle variations of tone and shading.

=== Awards and recognition ===
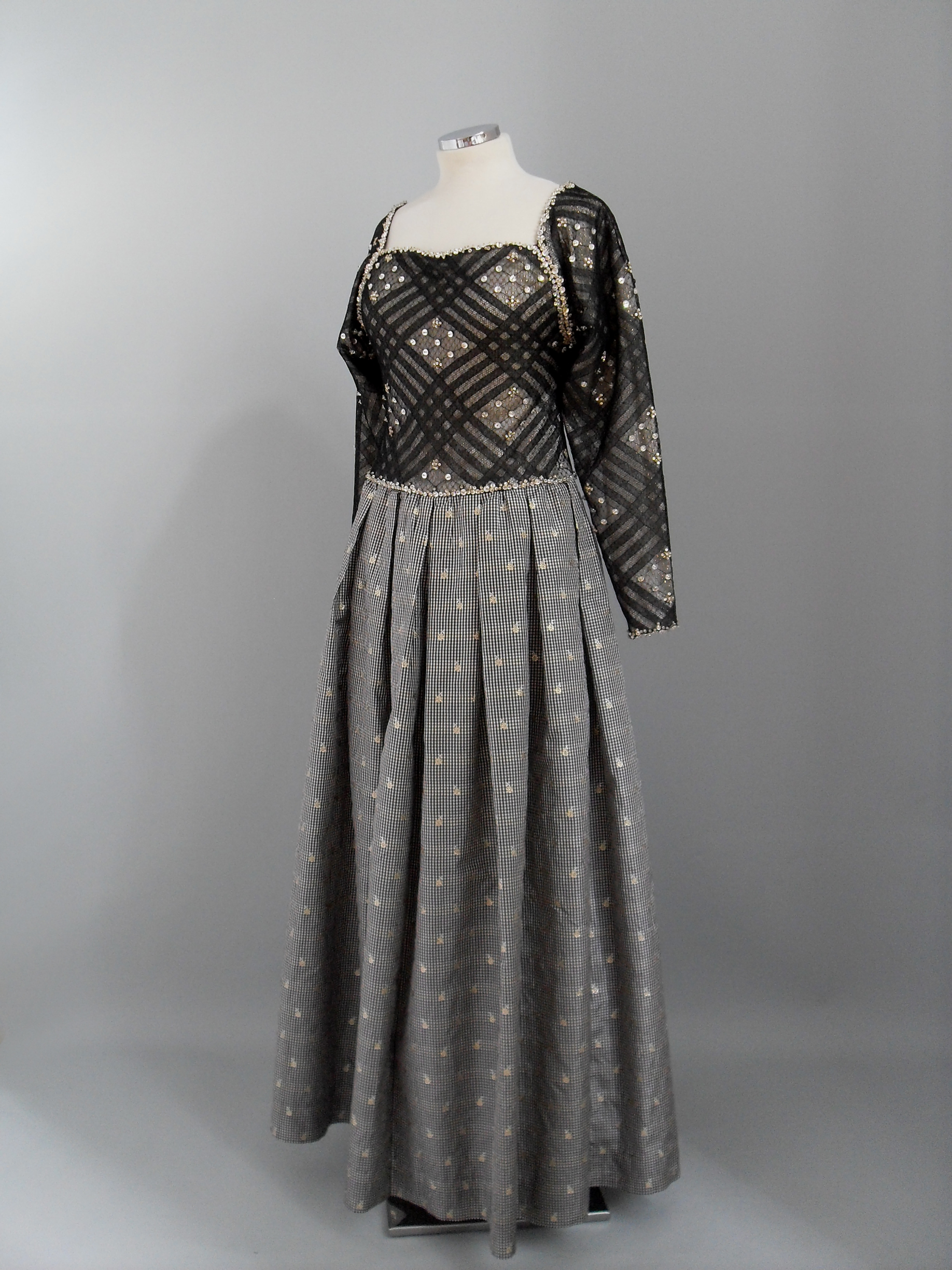
James Galanos lace and taffeta gown. New York 1980s. PFF collection, Nafplion

Galanos was the youngest designer to win the Coty Fashion Award in 1954. He was also a winner in 1956 and he was inducted into the Coty Hall of Fame in 1959. His other honors included the Crystal Ball Award from The Fashion Group of Philadelphia, 1963; the Fashion Award from the Drexel Institute of Technology, 1965; the London Sunday Times International Award, 1968; the Los Angeles Chamber of Commerce Golden 44 Award, 1980; a Diploma di Merita from the Universita delle Arte Terme, Italy, 1981. He was named to the International Best Dressed List Hall of Fame in 1982. Galanos also received the prestigious Council of Fashion Designers of America Lifetime Achievement Award in 1985. In the year 2000, the City of New York began honoring American fashion designers by placing bronze plaques along the pavement of Seventh Avenue. Dubbed the "Fashion Walk of Fame", Galanos was one of the first designers to be so honored. In 2007, he became the recipient of the Rodeo Drive Walk of Style Award, and one year later, in 2008, he received an honorary doctorate from the San Francisco Academy of Art University.

Galanos' career spanned more than half a century. "To James Galanos, fashion is all about making women look beautiful," wrote Anne-Marie Schiro in The New York Times, "and he has devoted 44 years of his life to designing clothes to that end." He "was always a hero to all those who worshiped at the feet of fashion, not just those who wore the clothes", wrote Bernardine Morris in an introduction to the catalogue of Galanos' retrospective exhibition at the Los Angeles County Museum of Art in 1996. "He was heralded as the equal of any of the mythic group of French designers who represented the apotheosis of fashion. The difference, then and now, is that Galanos' clothes were ready-to-wear; the French Haute Couture made custom clothes. In this, he is truly an American designer. For, in this country, it is ready-to-wear that dominates fashion, a lesson the French learned after he pointed the way. This may be James Galanos' major contribution to the fashion world: he brought brilliance and quality to styles meant to be bought off the rack"

In September 2016, the Robert and Penny Fox Historic Costume Collection of the Westphal College of Media Arts and Design at Drexel University received a gift from the James G. Galanos Foundation of nearly 700 ensembles. In 2018, two years after his passing, the university honored Galanos by naming a new exhibition within their fashion department after him.

== Personal life ==
Galanos never married. He was the uncle of fine jewelry designer Diana Vincent, of Washington Crossing, Pennsylvania. He retired in 1998 and lived in Palm Springs, California, and West Hollywood.

Galanos died on October 30, 2016, at his home in West Hollywood, at the age of 92.

== Museum exhibitions (partial list) ==
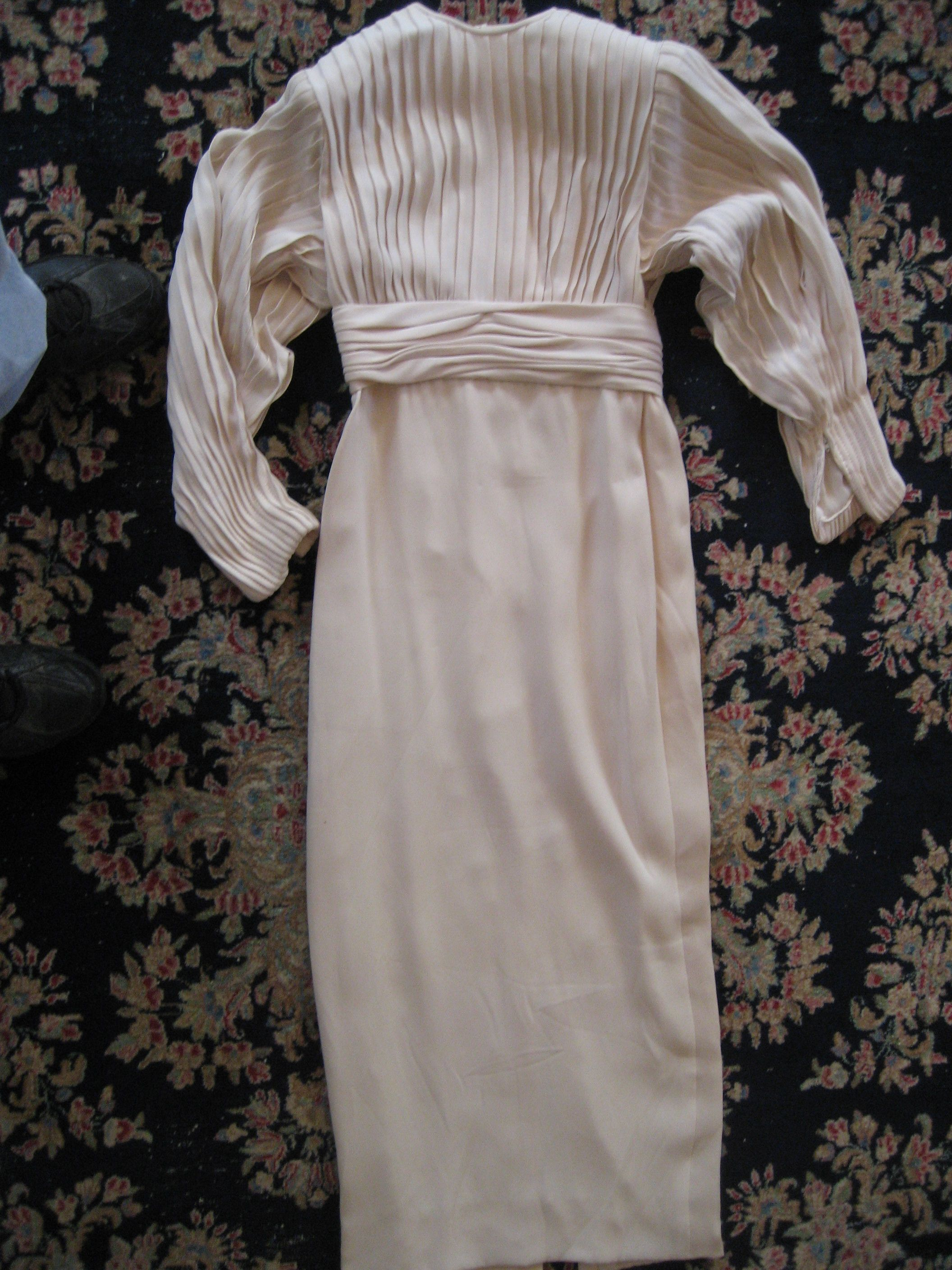
Pleated silk chiffon gown circa 1985

- Los Angeles County Museum of Art, Los Angeles, California
- Museum at Fashion Institute of Technology, New York, N.Y.
- Kent State University Museum, Kent, Ohio
- Smithsonian Institution, Washington DC
- Metropolitan Museum of Art, New York, N.Y.
- Brooklyn Museum of Art, Brooklyn, N.Y.
- Philadelphia Museum of Art, Philadelphia, Pennsylvania
- Ohio State University, Columbus, Ohio
- Dallas Museum of Art, Dallas, Texas
- Palm Springs Art Museum, Palm Springs, California
- Couture Pattern Museum, Santa Barbara, California

== Selected filmography ==
- Never Wave at a WAC, 1953
- Oh Dad, Poor Dad, Mamma's Hung You in the Closet and I'm Feelin' So Sad, 1967
- Ginger in the Morning, 1974
- Protocol, 1984

== Literature ==
- Williams, Beryl. Young Faces in Fashion. Philadelphia: J. B. Lippincott Company, 1956. ASIN B0007E744Y
- Levin, Phyllis Lee. The Wheels of Fashion. Garden City, N.Y.: Doubleday & Company, 1965. ASIN B0007DKMIA
- Bender, Marilyn. The Beautiful People. New York: Coward-McCann, 1967. ASIN B001Q8MM7O
- Vecchio, Walter. Riley, Robert. The Fashion Makers: A Photographic Record. New York: Bookthrift Co, 1968. ISBN 978-0-517-00541-5
- Watkins, Josephine Ellis. Who's Who in Fashion. New York: Fairchild Publications, 1975. ASIN B000MBSMYS
- Waltz, Barbara, and Morris, Bernardine. The Fashion Makers. New York: Random House, 1978. ISBN 978-0-394-41166-8
- Houck, Catherine. The Fashion Encyclopedia. New York: St. Martin's Press, 1982. ISBN 978-0-312-28401-5
- Diamonstein, Barbaralee. Fashion: The Inside Story. New York: Rizzoli, 1985. ISBN 978-0-8478-0610-2
- Milbank, Caroline Rennolds. Couture: The Great Designers. New York: Stewart, Tabori & Chang, 1985. ISBN 978-0-941434-51-5
- Milbank, Caroline Rennolds. New York Fashion: The Evolution of American Style. New York: Abrams Books, 1989. ISBN 978-0-8109-2647-9
- Gold, Annalee. 90 Years of Fashion. New York: Fairchild Publications, 1990. ISBN 978-0-87005-680-2
- Bradley, Barry Galanos. Cleveland: Western Reserve Historical Society, 1996. ISBN 0-911704-47-7
- Stegemeyer, Anne. Who's Who in Fashion. New York: Fairchild Publications, 2003. ISBN 978-1-56367-247-7
- Loring, John. Galanos, James. Lambert, Eleanore Tiffany in Fashion: A Study of American Fashion and Fashion Photography, 1933–2003. New York: Abrams, 2003. ISBN 978-0-8109-4637-8
- Sewell, Dennita. Extending the Runway: Tatiana Sorokko Style. Moscow: Russian Fashion Museum, 2010. ISBN 978-0-615-34760-8

== Sources ==
- Morrow, Suzanne Stark, The World of James Galanos. Architectural Digest, October 1981
- Talley, André Leon, A Certain Quality: Galanos. Vogue, April 1985
- Batterberry, Ariane and Michael, The Loner, Connoisseur. May 1985
- Milbank, Caroline Rennolds, James Galanos: Disciplined Elegance in the Hollywood Hills. Architectural Digest, September 1988
