= Diana Vincent =

American jewelry designer and businesswoman

Diana Vincent (born 1958 in Trenton, New Jersey) is an American jewelry designer and businesswoman.

== Biography ==
Vincent is the niece of American fashion designer James Galanos, whose shows are credited with inspiring her to pursue a design career. In 1976, she attended Temple University's Tyler School of Art in Philadelphia to study metalsmithing and jewelry design with Stanley Lechtzin. She studied at Tyler's Rome campus for a year and graduated in 1980 with a bachelor's degree in fine arts. Before deciding to focus on jewelry design, Vincent had explored oil painting, home dressmaking, and pottery.

== Jewelry ==
In 1984, Vincent and her husband Vincent Polisano opened Diana Vincent Inc. in Bucks County, Pennsylvania. That same year, Vincent received a Best New Designer of the Year award from the Jewelers of America, along with the President's Award for Merchandising and Display, and became the youngest person (at 26) to win the bi-annual De Beers Diamonds International Award. She won the De Beers award again in Milan in 1986, the only American jeweller to have done so consecutively. Other awards Vincent has received include the DeBeers Diamond Today Award (1985, 1987, and 1999); the International Pearl Design Award (Tokyo 1988); and the DeBeers Diamond of Distinction Award (1989). In 1998 she won a Platinum Passion Design Competition Award from the Platinum Guild International.

Vincent describes her work as "feminine", "contemporary" and being "simple, fluid and sensual". The influence of the performing arts and dance has been identified in her work.

Her work is held in the permanent museum collection of the Gemological Institute of America. She has also exhibited at the National Ornamental Metal Museum (1997) and the Kent State Art Museum (1998).

Described as one of Philadelphia's top 5 fashion artisans, Vincent's jewelry designs have been seen on the red carpet at the Oscars and featured in various fashion publications including Vogue, InStyle, Town & Country, and Modern Bride.

In 2003 Diana Vincent participated in the "Miles of Mules" charity fundraising project where fibreglass mules were placed around the Lehigh Valley area. Her mule, "Jewels", was displayed outside the James A. Michener Art Museum to raise funds for breast cancer awareness. She has also designed exclusive jewelry for charity purposes, such as a brooch to be sold to benefit the breast cancer facility at Bucks County.

== Professional affiliations ==
- American Gem Society
