= De Borchgrave d'Altena =

de Borchgrave d'Altena
- noble family
- Country: United Kingdom of the Netherlands, Belgium
- Titles: Count

The de Borchgrave d'Altena is the name of the Dutch and Belgian noble family from 's-Hertogenbosch and the County of Flanders.

== History ==
According to family tradition, the family is of German origin and the ancestors of this house were Burgraves of the Castle of Altena. This fact is not certain, but the family already claimed in the Middle Ages the coats of arms of the noble family of Altena (two averted salmons). The first Borchgraves acted as public servants of the city of Den Bosch. After the Reformation, the family moved to the Southern Netherlands.

In 1816, the family de Borchgrave d'Altena was admitted in the nobility of the United Kingdom of the Netherlands with the title of count. The Dutch branch is extinct, but the Walloon branch is still very much alive.

== Famous members ==
- Jean Guillaume Michel Pascal de Borchgrave d'Altena (1749–1818), Member of Parliament
- Guillaume Georges François de Borchgrave d'Altena (1774–1845), Member of Parliament
- Arnaud de Borchgrave (1926–2015), Belgian-American journalist
- Camille de Borchgrave d'Altena, married American heiress Ruth Snyder, granddaughter of Charlemagne Tower
- Elie de Borchgrave d'Altena, aka Elie Borgrave (1905–1992), Belgian abstract artist
- Joseph de Borchgrave d'Altena (1895–1975), Belgian art historian, scholar and writer

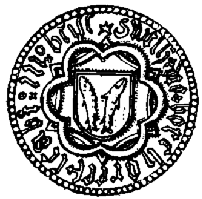
Seal of a member of the Borchgrave family

- Isabelle de Borchgrave
- Émile de Borchgrave
