= Good Design Awards =

Good Design Award or Good Design Awards can refer to:

- Good Design Award (Chicago Athenaeum), awarded by the Chicago Athenaeum Museum of Architecture and Design since 1996
- Good Design Award (Museum of Modern Art), awarded between 1950 and 1955 in the context of the exhibition series Good Design at the Museum of Modern Art, New York and the Merchandise Mart, Chicago
- Good Design Award (Japan) is an award sponsored by the Japan Institute of Design Promotion
