= Tatiana Sorokko =

Russian-American model, fashion journalist, and collector

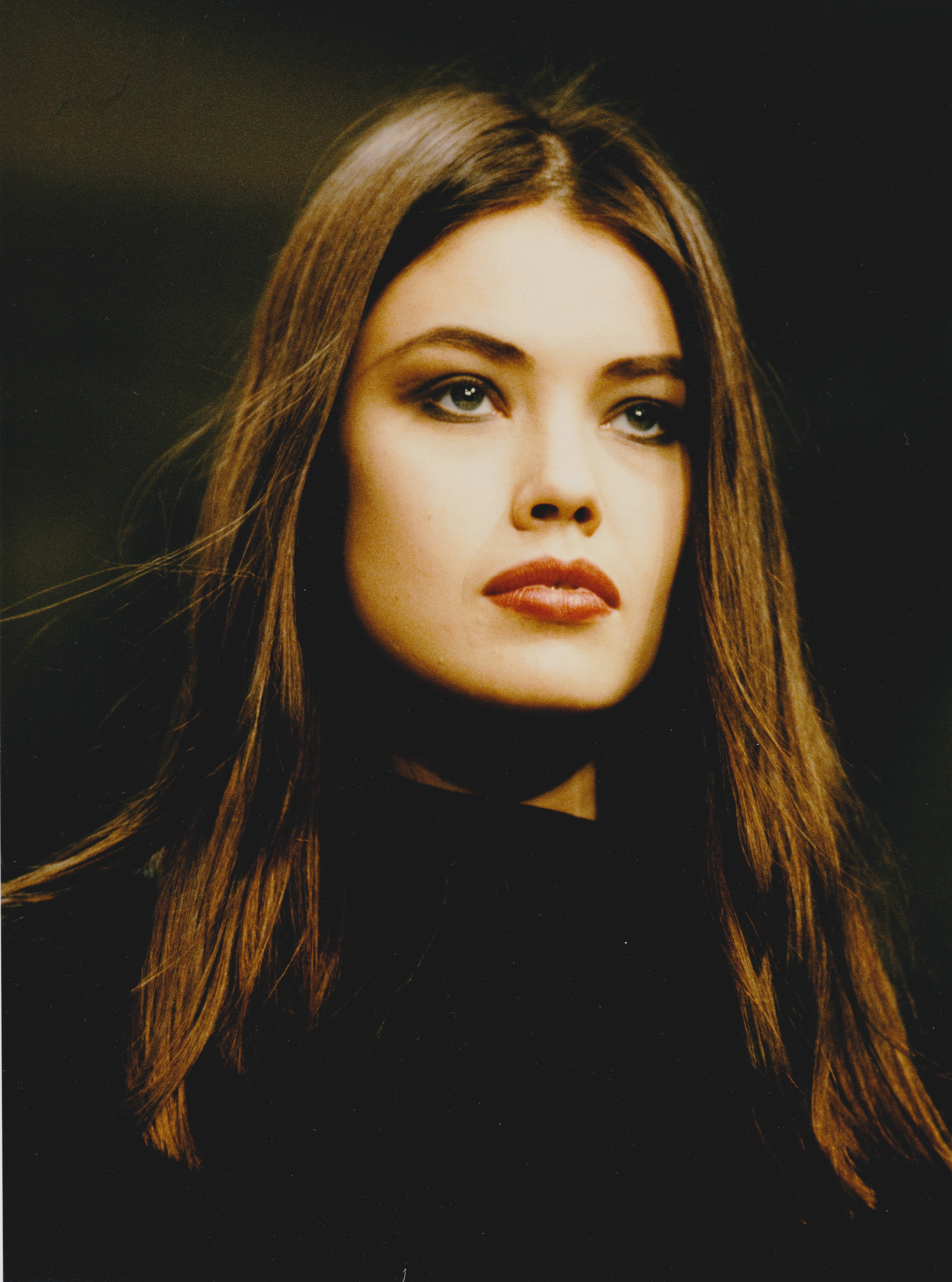
- Sorokko in November 2002
- Born: Tatyana Nikolayevna Ilyushkina; 26 December 1971 (age 54); Arzamas-16, Russian SFSR, Soviet Union (now Sarov, Russia)
- Spouse: Serge Sorokko (1992–present)
- Modeling information
- Height: 5 ft 11 in (1.80 m)
- Hair color: Brown
- Eye color: Blue/green

Tatiana Sorokko (née Ilyushkina; Russian: Татьяна Николаевна Сорокко, tr. Tatyana Nikolayevna Sorokko; born 26 December 1971) is a Russian-born American model, fashion journalist, and haute couture collector. She walked the runways for the world's most prominent designers and fashion houses, appeared on covers of leading fashion magazines, and became the first Russian model of the post-Soviet period to gain international recognition. After modeling, Sorokko worked as contributing editor for Vogue, Vanity Fair and Harper's Bazaar. Her distinct personal style and her private collection of historically important haute couture clothing were subjects of museum exhibitions in Russia and the U.S.

== Early life ==
The daughter of nuclear physicists, she grew up in Arzamas-16 (now Sarov), a "closed town" and top-secret nuclear research community in the former Soviet Union, and was expected to pursue a career in science. In 1989, while studying physics at the Moscow Institute of Physics and Technology, she was discovered by Parisian modeling agent Marilyn Gauthier, owner of Marilyn Model Agency, and invited to Paris, where she moved in 1990.

== Career ==
Within two weeks in Paris, she began walking runways for Dior and Yves Saint Laurent and was photographed for Harper's Bazaar by the influential French photographer Guy Bourdin. The 5 ft 11 in (180 cm) blue-eyed Sorokko has modeled for Dior, Givenchy, Chanel, Lanvin, Yves Saint Laurent, Christian Lacroix, Gianfranco Ferré, Claude Montana, Jean Paul Gaultier, Alexander McQueen, Comme des Garçons, Issey Miyake, Yohji Yamamoto, Giorgio Armani, Gianni Versace, Roberto Cavalli, Prada, Calvin Klein, Vivienne Westwood, Chado Ralph Rucci, Marc Jacobs, Michael Kors, Bill Blass, Ralph Lauren, Oscar de la Renta and Donna Karan, among others. She was frequently photographed for editorials and covers of European and American magazines such as Harper's Bazaar, Vogue, W, Elle, Glamour, and Cosmopolitan.

In 1992, she and her husband, Serge Sorokko, moved to California. Already well known by major fashion designers and editors, her career took off in the U.S., just as it had done in Europe. Aside from her modeling engagements, Sorokko continued her education at the Academy of Art University in San Francisco, where she studied History of Fashion. She appeared on the cover of Runway, a book of fashion photographs by Larry Fink, and was featured opposite Brad Pitt in a commercial for Acura Integra.

In 1994, she made a brief appearance in Robert Altman' s movie Prêt-à-Porter. She was the subject of a book, published in Moscow, Russian Models, by Ekaterina Vasilyeva, which credited her as the first widely recognized Russian model to emerge after perestroika.

Sorokko, who is proficient in both English and Russian, started a new job as its Foreign Correspondent and Contributing Editor with the release of the December 2001 issue of Vogue's Russian edition. She covered a variety of subjects and people as the creator of Telegram from Tatiana Sorokko, a well-liked monthly column of fashion and style commentary. Among numerous subjects of Sorokko's stories, drawn from her first-hand experiences, were fashion designers and artists including Gianfranco Ferré, Ralph Rucci, Andrée Putman, Manolo Blahnik, Yohji Yamamoto, Philip Treacy, Richard Avedon, and Herb Ritts. Her last Telegram was published in the December 2004 issue of Vogue. In the early 2000s, Sorokko also contributed to the Italian Vanity Fair, for whom she produced and styled photo shoots with prominent personalities, including actor Peter Coyote and author Isabel Allende, to name a few.

In January 2005, Sorokko began work as Contributing Editor for American Harper's Bazaar. Among many notable personalities, Sorokko interviewed Kateryna Yushchenko, American wife of the Ukrainian President, for the September 2005 issue, and, for the August 2008 issue, Speaker of the House, Nancy Pelosi.

Sorokko has styled shoots featuring Elizabeth Taylor, Joan Collins and Linda Evans, Donatella Versace and daughter, Allegra Beck, fashion designer Andrew Gn and Tod's founder, Diego Della Valle, Republican Presidential Nominee, Senator John McCain and wife Cindy McCain, Wolfgang Puck and his wife, accessories designer Gelila Assefa, and Ralph Lauren in Moscow, among others.

In 2009, she was listed in the Moscow edition of Time Out magazine among the extraordinary "50 People and Things that are Moscow's Gift to the World."

In December 2014, Sorokko made a modeling comeback with a six-page fashion editorial in Harper's Bazaar shot by Mark Seliger. According to the San Francisco Chronocle, "the spread, titled "A Grand Return," showcase[d] the fairy tale fashions and furs seen on the fall 2014 runways" and marked Sorokko's first foray back into modeling in more than a decade.

== Other projects ==
In 2004, she was invited to perform with the Russian National Orchestra, on tour in the United States, and she was the narrator at the Wind Quintet's debut performance of Jean-Pascal Beintus' Wolf Tracks, at the Phillips Collection in Washington, D.C. In its review of the performance, The Washington Post reported "watching a tall blond supermodel win all the Wolf Tracks applause."

Sorokko is an avid collector of haute couture and antique jewelry, and has frequently donated or loaned pieces from her collection to various museums, including the Metropolitan Museum of Art in New York, the Museum at the Fashion Institute of Technology, in New York, the de Young Museum and the California Palace of the Legion of Honor, in San Francisco, the Phoenix Art Museum, among others.

Sorokko is often invited to speak on the subjects of fashion and style, and her engagements have been with the Fine Arts Museums of San Francisco, the Phoenix Art Museum, the San Francisco Academy of Art University, and in 2019, with the Moscow State University. She has also been a featured guest on The Martha Stewart Show a number of times, discussing a wide range of topics, from cooking to fashion and collecting couture.

== Museum exhibitions ==
In April 2010, the Russian Fashion Museum in Moscow honored Sorokko with a large-scale exhibition, Extending the Runway: Tatiana Sorokko Style. The show featured a collection of over eighty garments and accessories from Sorokko's personal, largely haute couture wardrobe.

A hard cover book by the same name was published to accompany the exhibition and included a foreword by Harper's Bazaar editor Glenda Bailey and essays by fashion designer Ralph Rucci, photographer Marco Glaviano, and exhibition curator Dennita Sewell. The show was supported by the Ministry of Culture of the Russian Federation. It was widely covered in the Russian media and hailed as the "most glamorous event in the life of the capital."

In September 2010, Extending the Runway: Tatiana Sorokko Style exhibition traveled from Moscow to the United States and made its U.S. debut at the Phoenix Art Museum. Both exhibitions showcased works from the early 20th century through the beginning of the 21st century, by renowned designers and fashion houses such as Mariano Fortuny, Jeanne Paquin, Jeanne Lanvin, Grès, Pierre Balmain, Jean Patou, Balenciaga, Emanuel Ungaro, Azzedine Alaia, Jean Paul Gaultier, Gianfranco Ferré, Vivienne Westwood, Comme des Garçons, Yohji Yamamoto, Halston, James Galanos, and Chado Ralph Rucci, among others.

During Sorokko's extensive modeling career, she has met and befriended many of the designers represented in the exhibition. She also became a private client for quite a few of them, most notably Ralph Rucci, and the show, according to FIT Museum director Valerie Steele, included "lots of beautiful Ralph Rucci". Many of the haute couture gowns on display boasted luxurious sequin and metallic thread embroideries, and hand-burnt ostrich feathers, while others, according to the Financial Times, were "covered with pearls," or elaborately embroidered with beads by artisans of the French house of Lesage. The exhibition featured her collection of rare Hermès bags in exotic skins, as well as unique pieces of jewelry by the illustrious Venetian jewelry house, Codognato. The show opened to the public on 16 September 2010 and was on display through 2 January 2011.

To mark the opening of the exhibition and release of the accompanying hard cover catalog, private book signing parties have been hosted by Bulgari in San Francisco and Beverly Hills, and Roger Vivier in Paris and New York. The events were packed with fashion insiders, who snapped up more than three hundred autographed copies of the book at the San Francisco party alone.

== Personal style ==
Style is inborn. Fashion you can learn. Fashion is all around. It is fleeting. It goes by. Style is your core and soul. You have it or you don't. You can educate yourself as much as you want, but I don't think you can truly possess it if you didn't have it from the beginning.

— Tatiana Sorokko

Sorokko's distinct personal style has earned her a reputation as a "style icon," a fashion visionary, and "the queen of vintage couture," but it was Vogue that over a decade ago, first recognized her style's influence on fashion and touted Sorokko as an "eagle-eyed iconoclast," a "reluctant trend-setter," and a "fad-making model." Among the trends she has been credited for starting or popularizing, are the widespread today vintage clothing and "skull" jewelry, particularly that of the cult Italian designer Attilio Codognato, whose memento mori jewelry she has been wearing and championing since the early 1990s. According to Style.com, Sorokko's style can at times be "subversive ... I'm wearing my blouse upside down and backward", she told the reporter, referring to her Yves Saint Laurent haute couture blouse. On another occasion, Sorokko was asked by Jim Shi of the Daily Front Row about the oversized Donna Karan coat she was wearing. "This is her trench from the last collection", she informed him. "You may not recognize it because I am wearing it inside out. You know me – wearing it the normal way would be too ordinary." More often, however, Sorokko's style is described as "timeless". "Tatiana's timeless wardrobe reflects her individual point of view," fashion curator Dennita Sewell told ArtDaily. Her "inborn sense of style and extensive modeling experience shape her selections which transcend current fashion trends." According to Glenda Bailey, "Tatiana is an icon for the way she looks in fashion, but also for the way she looks at fashion. It makes her a great fashion collaborator." Ralph Rucci agrees: "Tatiana's style is not only flawless, it is also highly influential. She has absolutely inspired me."

Sorokko was named in 2000 to the International "100 Best Dressed" list by American Vogue, and in 2007 to the "Best Dressed Women of All Time" list by Harper's Bazaar in its 140th anniversary issue. She made Bazaar's yearly Best Dressed list again continuously from 2008 to 2014.

== Personal life ==
In 1992, Sorokko married Serge Sorokko, real estate developer and art collector turned art dealer with galleries in San Francisco, New York, and Beverly Hills. She has one stepdaughter. The couple reside in the San Francisco Bay Area.

== Bibliography ==
- Bailey, Glenda. Harper's Bazaar: Greatest Hits. New York: Abrams, 2011; ISBN 978-1-4197-0070-5
- Sewell, Dennita. Extending the Runway: Tatiana Sorokko Style. Moscow: Russian Fashion Museum, 2010; ISBN 978-0-615-34760-8
- Tennant, Christopher. The Official Filthy Rich Handbook. New York: Workman Publishing Company, 2008; ISBN 978-0-7611-4703-9
- Vasilyeva, Ekaterina. Russkiye Modeli. Moscow: Amphora, 2007; ISBN 978-5-367-00574-5
- Saeks, Diane Dorrans. San Francisco Style. Chapter: "Serge & Tatiana Sorokko in Mill Valley". San Francisco: Chronicle Books, 2004; ISBN 978-0-8118-0869-9
- Fink, Larry. Runway. New York: powerHouse Books, 2001; ISBN 978-1-57687-027-3
