= Pleat (knitting) =

In knitting, pleats can be made in several ways.

Mock pleats can be made by alternating stitches that tend to recede (such as purl or slip wyif), stitches that lie flat (such as seed or plissé) and stitches that tend to advance (such as knit and slip wyib) along the backward fold, the flat face and the forward fold, respectively.

By contrast, true pleats can be made by folding the knitted fabric over and knitting the matching stitches together pairwise. Any style of pleat can be made in this way, e.g., knife pleats or box pleats.
