= Serge Sorokko =

American art dealer

- Born: 26 April 1954 (age 72); Riga, Latvia
- Occupations: Art dealer, publisher
- Spouse: Tatiana Sorokko (m. 1992)
- Children: 1
- Awards: Chevalier de l'Ordre des Arts et des Lettres; Russian Academy of Arts Medal of Merit
- Website: Serge Sorokko Gallery

Serge Sorokko (born 26 April 1954) is an American art dealer, publisher and owner of the Serge Sorokko Gallery in San Francisco. He played a major role in establishing the first cultural exchanges in the field of visual arts between the United States and the Soviet Union during the period of perestroika. Sorokko is the recipient of various international honors and awards for his contributions to culture.

== Early life ==
Serge Sorokko turned a lifelong interest in art into eponymous fine art galleries selling the work of contemporary artists. He was born in Riga, Latvia, then part of the Soviet Union. His mother was a lawyer and father an architect and art collector, recognized for designing, in the 1960s and 1970s, some of Riga's most prominent public buildings. Sorokko graduated magna cum laude from the Latvian State University (now University of Latvia) in 1977 with an advanced degree in English literature. In 1978, at the age of 24, he emigrated to the United States and settled in San Francisco. He became a naturalized American citizen in 1984.

== Career ==
Shortly after his arrival in the US in 1979, Sorokko began work as an art consultant for a San Francisco contemporary art gallery. In 1982, he became co-owner of the Bowles/Sorokko Galleries in San Francisco and, together with his business partner Franklin Bowles, opened a new two floor gallery on Rodeo Drive, in Beverly Hills. The Sorokko galleries, which by 1987 also included a location in New York City, exhibited works by the School of Paris as well as the next generation of European painters including David Hockney, among others.

One of Sorokko's main initiatives was advancing the virtually nonexistent public profile of the underground art movement then taking place in the Soviet Union, which included works by expatriates who had relocated to the West, as well as the multitude who remained. With the advent of glasnost, in 1988, Sorokko orchestrated and sponsored an unprecedented return to the Soviet Union of the exiled Russian artist Mihail Chemiakin, for a retrospective exhibition at the Moscow Tretyakov Gallery. It was then that Sorokko met Tair Salakhov, First Secretary of the Union of Soviet Artists. Together with Salakhov, Sorokko has been directly involved with bringing art exhibitions to museum venues in Russia and, in exchange, showing established, but never before seen in the West, Russian artists in his galleries in the U.S.

In 1989, Sorokko was sought out by the Soviet Union's Ministry of Culture, to become its intermediary to the New York art scene, for the first ever exhibition of paintings of contemporary New York artists in Moscow, at the Kuznetsky Most Exhibition Hall. The show, which drew mixed reviews, was curated by Donald Kuspit and entitled "Painting Beyond the Death of Painting."

=== Serge Sorokko Gallery ===
In 1996, Sorokko sold his interest in the Bowles/Sorokko Galleries and opened the three-story Serge Sorokko Gallery on Union Square, in San Francisco, and one year later, in 1997, a second three-storey gallery on West Broadway, in New York City's SoHo district. The inaugural exhibition in New York, which, according to David Schonauer, editor-in-chief of American Photo magazine, became "the inspiration for the special issue of American Photo," was the critically acclaimed multimedia and photography installation entitled "The Last Party: Nightworld in Photographs". The show was timed to coincide with the would-be 20th anniversary of Studio 54 and release of Anthony Haden-Guest’s nightlife chronicle, The Last Party: Studio 54, Disco and the Culture of the Night. A diverse group of American and European artists on exhibit spanned an entire century. According to the British Independent, the "opening gala of the Serge Sorokko Gallery in SoHo was so crowded that even Spike Lee cooled his heels on the sidewalk rather than brave the crush. The gallery featured an exhibition of hundreds of photographs of the club scene by Diane Arbus, Weegee, Irving Penn, Helmut Newton and assorted paparazzi, serving as photographic crib sheets for the thousands of guests at the opening. There were photos of Mick Jagger and Jerry Hall; of Cher and of Eddie Murphy; of bare-breasted teenage club-girls with glitter on their faces; of deeply stoned couples in hotpants and afros, goosing each other in front of punk clubs; and of fashion-world luminaries staring at naked, writhing performance artists." Describing the "mob of guests kept out of the overpacked gallery by bouncers," columnist Bob Morris wrote in The New York Times: "And this door scene was bad. Tina Louise was shut outside far too long for a Gilligan's Island icon. Richard Johnson, the editor of the New York Post's Page Six, was stuck outside for a while, too... Robert Altman couldn't get in either. What could be more delicious than looking out on someone that important among a crowd being squished against the gallery window like insects on a windshield?" "The Last Party is a fascinating exhibition," declared the British journalist and author Suzy Menkes in the International Herald Tribune, "because of the wide variety of its 60 different photographers and 300 images excellently orchestrated and hung. But also because it captures its subjects unselfconsciously. In that, it pinions a butterfly moment of social history."

According to the New York Daily News, the gallery soon became "the place where celebrities hang out," and in 1998, Woody Allen used the Sorokko gallery to shoot an exhibition opening scene for his film Celebrity.

In March 2007, Sorokko staged a U.S. premiere of New Religion, a multimedia installation of the British artist Damien Hirst, and in September 2007 – a world premiere of drawings by the 16th century Italian artist Jacopo Strada. Entitled "Jacopo Strada (1510 – 1588). Mannerist Splendor: Extravagant Designs for a Royal Table", the exhibition was accompanied by a hard cover catalogue authored by Dr. Sarah Lawrence, director of the Master of Arts Program in Decorative Arts and Design at the Cooper Hewitt National Design Museum in New York.

In 2010, Serge Sorokko Gallery moved from its location on Grant Avenue to a much larger ground floor space at 55 Geary Street, on Union Square in San Francisco. The new gallery's inaugural exhibition was a world premiere of a site-specific installation of paintings, trompe-l'œil works on paper and sculptures by the Belgian artist Isabelle de Borchgrave.

=== Publishing ===
Sorokko’s interest in photography has intensified. Beginning in 2000, the Serge Sorokko Gallery published its first photography portfolio, which benefited the Brooklyn Academy of Music (BAM). The portfolio included pieces by well-known contemporary artists. This publishing venture was followed in 2004, by the publication of the BAM Photography Portfolio II. In 2008, Sorokko unveiled the BAM Photography Portfolio III, which showcased original works by twelve contemporary artists.

Also in 2008, Sorokko published 10 Iris Prints, a portfolio of photographs by the American fashion designer turned photographer James Galanos.

== Awards ==
• In 2004, the Russian Academy of Arts presented Sorokko with its Medal of Merit for his work in the arts.

• In 2005, the government of France recognized Sorokko’s contribution to culture, by bestowing upon him the honor of Chevalier des Arts et des Lettres (Knight of the Arts and Letters).

== Personal life ==
Sorokko's first marriage ended in divorce. He has one daughter. In 1992, he married the Russian model Tatiana Sorokko, in Beverly Hills, California; they reside in the San Francisco Bay Area.

== Bibliography ==
- Moran, Michael. The Reckoning: Debt, Democracy, and the Future of American Power. London. Palgrave Macmillan, 2012. ISBN 978-0-2303-3993-4
- Lawrence, Sarah. Jacopo Strada (1510 – 1588). Mannerist Splendor: Extravagant Designs for a Royal Table. San Francisco: Serge Sorokko Gallery, 2007. ISBN 978-0-9797763-0-4
- Saeks, Diane Dorrans. San Francisco Style. Chapter: "Serge & Tatiana Sorokko in Mill Valley." San Francisco: Chronicle Books, 2004. ISBN 978-0-8118-0869-9
- Bowles, Franklin. Sorokko, Serge. Dupin, Jacques. "Joan Miró: The Last Etchings." San Francisco: Bowles/Sorokko Gallery, 1995. ASIN B0016SO6GO
- Johnson, Robert Flynn. "Leonard Baskin: Sculpture, Watercolors and Drawings." San Francisco: Bowles/Sorokko Gallery, 1990. ASIN B003X5V9A4
- Dupin, Jacques. "Joan Miró: The Last Lithographs." San Francisco: Bowles/Sorokko Gallery, 1987. ASIN B0010ILXES
