= Nazarian =

Nazarian or Nazaryan (Armenian: Նազարյան) is an Armenian surname, and its meaning can be roughly translated into "son of Nazar." The surname is also commonly used in families coming from Iran in addition to Armenia. Iran and Armenia share a border. It can refer to the following people:

== Nazarian ==
- Adrin Nazarian (born 1973), American politician
- Angella Nazarian, Iranian-born American author
- Ara Nazarian (born 1971), American biomedical engineer, academic and entrepreneur
- Arthur Nazarian, Lebanese businessman and MP
- Bruce Nazarian (1949–2015), American musician
- David Nazarian, Iranian-born American businessman
- Eric Nazarian, Armenian-American film director
- Izak Parviz Nazarian (1929–2017), Iranian-born American billionaire and entrepreneur
- John James Nazarian (born 1952), American private investigator
- Mariam Nazarian, American concert pianist and producer
- Sam Nazarian, Iranian born American entrepreneur
- Santiago Nazarian (born 1977), Brazilian writer
- Sharon Nazarian, Iranian-born American Senior Vice President of International Affairs for the Anti-Defamation League
- Sheila Nazarian, Iranian-American plastic surgeon and television personality
- Stepanos Nazarian (1812–1879), Russian Armenian publisher, historian of literature and orientalist
- Vera Nazarian (born 1966), Russian-born American writer of Armenian ancestry
- Younes Nazarian (1931–2022), Iranian-born American entrepreneur
- Yenovk Nazarian (1868–1928), Armenian portrait and landscape painter

== Nazaryan ==
- Armen Nazaryan (born 1974), Armenian Greco-Roman wrestler
- Armen Nazaryan (judoka) (born 1982), Armenian judoka
- Edmond Nazaryan (born 2002), Bulgarian Greco-Roman wrestler of Armenian descent
- Gegham Nazaryan (born 1971), Armenian politician and former journalist
- Hovhannes Nazaryan (born 1998), Armenian footballer
- Lena Nazaryan (born 1983), Armenian politician
- Rafael Nazaryan (born 1975), Armenian football player and manager
- Raya Nazaryan (born 1985), Bulgarian politician
- Robert Nazaryan (1956–2026), Armenian politician
- Suren Nazaryan (1929–1999), Armenian sculptor

== Nazariantz ==
- Hrand Nazariantz (1886–1962), Ottoman Armenian journalist and supporter of Armenian independence

== See also ==
Nazari
