= Sharon Nazarian =

American activist, academic, and philanthropist

- Born: Tehran, Iran
- Education: University of Southern California (B.A., M.A., Ph.D.)
- Occupations: Senior Vice President, International Affairs, Anti-Defamation League (ADL)
- Spouse: Fernando Flint
- Parent(s): Younes Nazarian; Soraya Nazarian
- Relatives: Sam Nazarian (brother); David Nazarian (brother); Shulamit Nazarian (sister); Angella Nazarian (sister-in-law)

Sharon Nazarian is an American social activist, academic and philanthropist. She is currently the Senior Vice President, International Affairs, for the Anti-Defamation League.

== Early life ==
Sharon Nazarian was born in Tehran, Iran. Her father, Younes Nazarian, was a businessman, philanthropist, and an early investor in the satellite technology company Qualcomm. Her mother, Soraya Nazarian, is a sculptor. She has two brothers, Sam Nazarian, David Nazarian, and a sister, Shulamit Nazarian. During the Iranian Revolution of 1979, she immigrated to the United States, settling in Beverly Hills, California with her parents and siblings.

She graduated from the University of Southern California (USC), where she received a Bachelor of Arts degree in Journalism and International Relations. She then received a master's degree and a PhD in political science from USC.

== Career ==
In 2017, Nazarian joined the executive team of the Anti-Defamation League (ADL) as Senior Vice President for International Affairs, taking the responsibility of fighting Antisemitism and racial hatred around the globe, including overseeing ADL's Israel office.

In September 2019, Nazarian testified before a joint House committee hearing on the Internationalization of the Global White Supremacy Movement. In June 2019, Nazarian represented the Anti-Defamation League in Mexico City, Mexico where ADL and the Mexican Foreign Ministry signed an agreement to work together to protect people of Mexican heritage living in the United States who are victims of discrimination, bigotry, bullying, and hate crimes. In January 2020, Nazarian testified before the US Commission on International Religious Freedom regarding global efforts to counter Antisemitism.

Prior to Anti-Defamation League, Nazarian was active in three worlds: academia, philanthropy and foreign policy. She is the president of the Y&S Nazarian Family Foundation, with a regional office in Israel named the Ima Foundation. She is also the founder of the Y&S Nazarian Center for Israel Studies at the University of California, Los Angeles (UCLA). and chair of its advisory board. Sharon taught as an adjunct professor at UCLA in the Department of Political Science, is a member of the Council of Foreign Relations and sits on a myriad of foreign policy boards.

She is a major shareholder of Nazarian Enterprises and SBE Entertainment Group.

In 2021, Nazarian was considered for an ambassadorship position at the Office to Monitor and Combat Anti-Semitism in the Biden administration.

== Philanthropy ==
Nazarian serves as the president of the Younes and Soraya Nazarian Family Foundation, which is dedicated to the promotion of education as the most important catalyst for societal change. The foundation supports educational causes in a broad spectrum of institutions: academic, public policy, and community-based social and artistic programs. Nazarian also serves on the Board of Governors of the University of Haifa.

On May 6, 2013, Nazarian was the recipient of a Deborah Award from the Anti-Defamation League in a ceremony at the SLS Hotel, Beverly Hills. In 2015, Nazarian was the recipient of the 2015 Israel Film Festival Humanitarian Award in Beverly Hills, CA. She was honored for her contribution to the Oscar-Nominated Israeli Film Baba Joon.

== Personal life ==
Nazarian was married to Sharyar Baradaran, a periodontist, from 1990 to the early 2010s. She now resides in Los Angeles with her husband, Fernando Flint, and her three children.
