= Jeremy Fall =

American chef, restaurateur, and entrepreneur

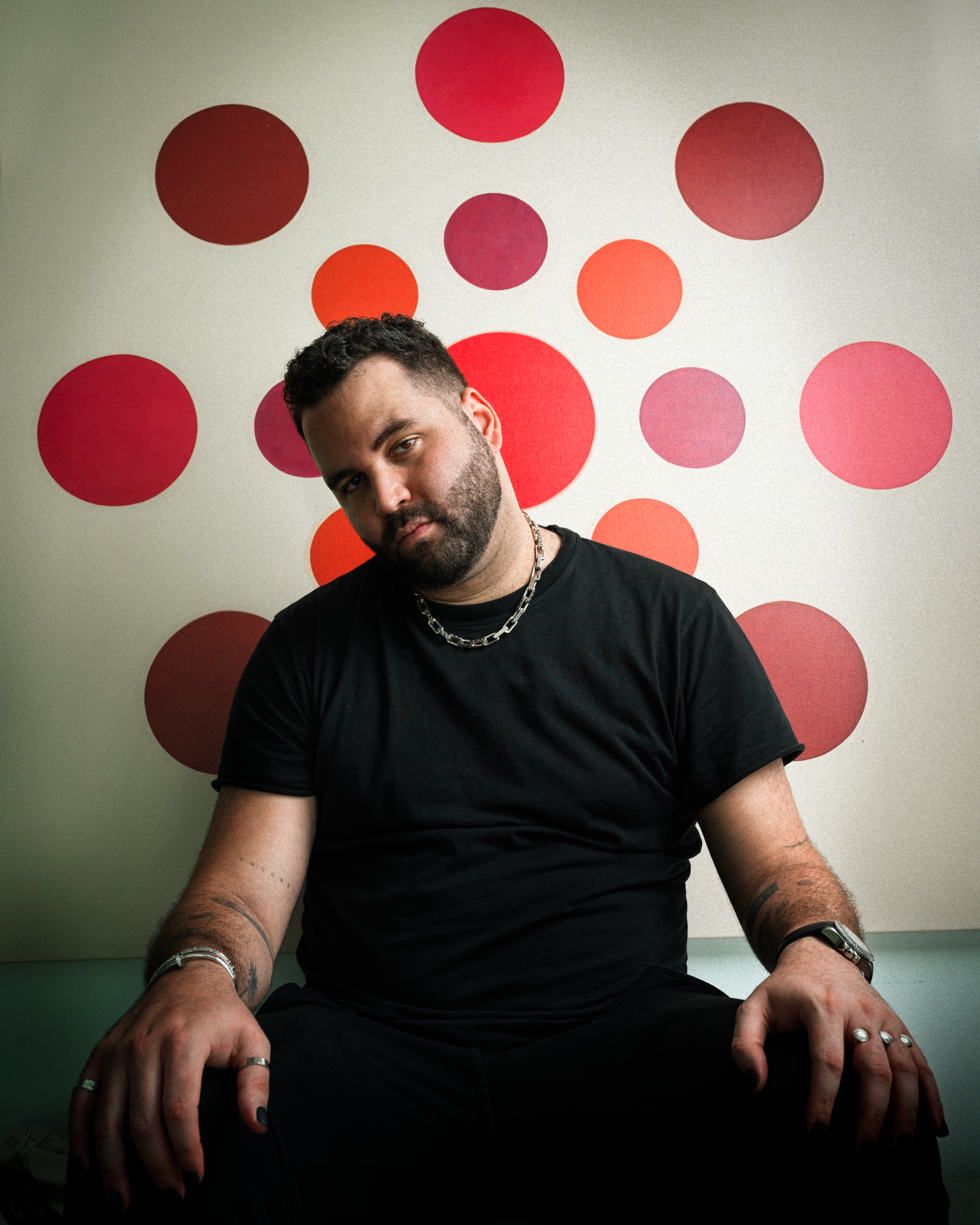
- Born: August 3, 1990 (age 36); Los Angeles, California, U.S.
- Culinary career
- Cooking style: California
- Previous restaurants
- Genesis; Golden Box; King Eddy Saloon; Easy's Burgers; Nighthawk: Breakfast Bar; Tinfoil: Liquor & Grocery; Nighthawk: AM; Easy's; Paperboy Pizzeria; Mixtape; Chapter; Jukebox; McFly's Bird Shoppe; Unplugged
- Television show
- Beats for Breakfast (2021-present)
- Awardss
- Zagat 30 Under 30 (2016); Magic Johnson's The Playbook 32 Under 32 (2018); Forbes 30 Under 30, Food & Drink (2020)
- Occupations: Restaurateur; Chef
- Website: jfall.com

Jeremy Fall (born August 3, 1990) is an American chef, restaurateur, and entrepreneur. He is the co-founder and former CEO of J. Fall Group. Fall is also the founder of the media and food company, JFALL. Fall founded and operated restaurants and bars in Los Angeles, California and Chicago, Illinois. He is the first chef and restaurateur to sign with Jay-Z's entertainment company, Roc Nation.

In July 2025, Fall launched Drugstore, a modern kitchen concept focused on made-from-scratch menu items using organic, regenerative, and seed-oil-free ingredients.

== Early life ==
Of Tunisian, French, Caribbean, and Jewish descent, Fall was born and raised as an only child in Los Angeles, California. Fall's parents, born in Tunisia and France, emigrated to the United States before Fall was born. Fall's mother owned a café in Los Angeles.

== Early career ==
Fall worked for the entertainment and special event venue, Avalon Hollywood, serving as its promotions manager. In 2008, while attending Occidental College, Fall founded Cliché Magazine, a digital magazine focused on fashion and music.

== Career ==
In 2014, Fall opened three bars. The first was Genesis, a pop-up bar and nightclub located in a vintage Hollywood attic. His second pop-up bar, Golden Box, inspired by 1980s Manhattan nightclubs such as Studio 54 and The Limelight, opened in the former LA Writers Room. In December 2014, Fall re-opened the former Skid-Row Los Angeles dive bar, King Eddy Saloon.

In January 2016, Fall opened his first restaurant, Nighthawk: Breakfast Bar, a late-night breakfast and cocktail establishment, in Venice, California. Eater.com recognized Nighthawk on its list of "Hottest Bars from Coast to Coast" in North America. Nighthawk's "Spiked Cereal Milk" has been featured in Chowhound's "5 Unexpected Cocktails to Drink Right Now in Los Angeles."

Later in 2016, Fall collaborated with chef Alvin Cailan of Eggslut to open walk-up burger stand Easy's in Chinatown, LA.

In 2020, at age 29, Fall was named to Forbes 30 Under 30, Food & Drink list.

=== J. Fall Group ===
In 2014, Fall met Henry Costa at Costa's West Hollywood restaurant, Link. In 2016, Fall partnered with Costa, a Wall Street investment banker-turned-chef and restaurateur, to co-found the J. Fall Group. Fall managed the J. Fall Group's creative decisions as well as branding and marketing while Costa headed the company's finance and operations.

In November 2016, they opened the J. Fall Group's first business, Tinfoil Liquor & Grocery, in Highland Park in Los Angeles. The New York City-inspired space included a street-front liquor store with a speakeasy-style deli in the back that required a password to enter.

In November 2017, the J. Fall Group opened Nighthawk: AM, a daytime fast-casual restaurant similar to the original late-night restaurant, in Chicago. Fall later opened a second Nighthawk: AM location in the Beverly Center in Los Angeles.

In July 2018, Easy's Burger moved locations, rebranded to "Easy's" and opened a full-service bar and restaurant with a '90s diner theme in the Beverly Center Mall between Beverly Hills and West Hollywood.

In August 2018, Fall and the J. Fall Group partnered with United Talent Agency to open rock-and-roll-themed pizzeria named Paperboy Pizza in the Gallery Food Hall in Santa Monica, California.

By 2019, Fall had opened a total of 14 restaurant locations around the United States. That year, In 2019, Los Angeles-based K2 Restaurants acquired the J. Fall Group and its existing restaurant brands, Nighthawk Breakfast Bar, Nighthawk: A.M., Tinfoil: Liquor & Grocery, Paperboy Pizza, and Easy's, as well as upcoming restaurant brands, Italian-themed Chapter, and Jukebox, to be located within Chapter in Waco, Texas. Fall remained with the company as the creative director of the brands in the year following the acquisition.

In 2019, following the K2 acquisition of the J. Fall Group, Fall and Costa opened 1980s-themed chicken tender restaurant, McFly's Bird Shoppe, and the 1990s-themed Americana bar and restaurant, Unplugged, (named after the MTV show, adjacent to one another in Five Points Lane in Birmingham, Alabama.

=== Other restaurants ===
In 2018, Fall's chicken sandwich was featured on menus at the Blue Ribbon restaurant locations.

In August 2019, Fall opened the restaurant, Mixtape, in the Fairfax District of Los Angeles. Reflecting Fall's heritage, Mixtape's menu includes Tunisian, Caribbean, Jewish, and French cuisine. The restaurant exhibits various visual art contributions from artists such as Quincy Jones, Jaden Smith, Vic Mensa, Brandon Boyd of Incubus, Tokimonsta, and Serj Tankian, as well as custom weekend brunch playlists compiled by Robin Thicke. Fall collaborated with rapper, Phora, to design the uniforms for Mixtape staff.

In 2021, Fall's "J. Fall Blvd. Sandwich" became a featured item on the famous restaurant chain Mel's Drive-In's menu. Fall and Mel's Diner also partnered to sell t-shirts featuring both Fall and Mel's.

Fall has worked with the James Beard Foundation to prepare meals for the Foundation's dinner events.

=== Drugstore (2025-present) ===
In July 2025, Fall launched Drugstore, a delivery-first kitchen restaurant focused on made-from-scratch menu items using organic, regenerative, and seed-oil-free ingredients. The restaurant debuted with a summer pop-up in Amagansett, later opening in New York City.

The restaurant sells smoothies, coffee, matcha, and food.

=== Television and media ===
Fall has appeared on several network food and cooking television shows since 2016. In 2016, Bravo's digital series, Going Off the Menu, featured Fall and his restaurant, Tinfoil, in an episode. In 2017, Fall appeared on two Guy Fieri-hosted Food Network shows – first, "The Bite" episode of Guy's Big Project; and later, the "Breakfast, Brisket and Belly" episode of Diners, Drive-Ins and Dives, which featured Fall in his Nighthawk: Breakfast Bar kitchen. Fall also Hallmark Channel's Home & Family and the Food Network's Food Network Star.

In 2021, Fall launched his self-hosted podcast, Dinner Party, releasing the premiere episode on June 23, 2021, with actor, host, and comedian, Lamorne Morris, as the podcast's inaugural guest. The podcast centers around discussions of culture, mental health, and creativity.

In 2021, Fall partnered with Grammy-winning artist, Miguel, to executive produce his first series, Beats for Breakfast, which airs on Facebook Watch. Starring both Fall and Miguel, each episode of Beats for Breakfast features Fall cooking a recipe while Miguel simultaneously creates new music beside Fall in the kitchen. According to Fall, the program originated from Miguel, who thought of the concept for the show while visiting Fall’s Nighthawk restaurant. Episodes of Beats for Breakfast, including the show's first eight episodes, are posted on Miguel's Facebook page.

In September 2025, Fall launched "Waves," a microwave-only cooking show executive produced by Hypebeast. The series covers beginner-friendly recipes made in the microwave, with weekly episodes showing step-by-step guides. Episodes have included recipes such as birria tacos, steak frites au poivre, miso butter salmon, shakshuka chilaquiles, and coconut shrimp curry.

=== Partnerships, endorsements, and other business ventures ===
In 2018, Fall became the first chef and restaurateur to sign with and be managed by Jay-Z's Roc Nation. Fall is also represented by United Talent Agency.

In 2018, Fall collaborated with the streetwear subscription box company, ThreadBeast, to curate a 1990s-themed box, which included a "food porn" viewmaster with images from his restaurants.

In 2021, Fall founded his own media company, jfall, through which he produced and currently operates his Dinner Party podcast.

In 2022, Fall published the ebook Do You Know Who I Am?: Battling Imposter Syndrome in Hollywood. In May 2022, Fall launched the Web3 community and brand Probably Nothing.

== Mental health advocacy ==
Fall is an advocate for mental healthcare assistance. Fall's own struggles with mental health and anxiety dating back to his childhood served as motivation for his podcast, which discusses mental health. In May 2021, Fall appeared on The Mental Health Coalition's 1-2-1 series to discuss topics and issues surrounding mental health.

In 2021, Fall also appeared on the cover of Sand Magazine and served as Guest Editor for the edition, which focused on mental health and comfort food.

== Political Activism ==
In June 2025, Fall publicly spoke out against the Trump administration, encouraging people to engage in peaceful civil disobedience and protest. Speaking to TMZ, Fall criticized a military parade scheduled for the Army's 250th anniversary, stating "The military is not his personal puppet show" and encouraged Americans not to remain silent against what he characterized as authoritarian actions.

== Filmography ==
Year	Program	Episode Name(s)	Season, Episode(s)	Network / Platform	Role	Ref
2016	Going Off the Menu	● "High Spirits"	Season 2, Episode 3	Bravo	Self	
2016	Recipe Hunters	● "What's APP'enin'"	Season 1, Episode 6		Self	
2017	Guy's Big Project	● "The Bite"	Season 1, Episode 2	Food Network	Self	
2017	Diners, Drive-Ins and Dives	● "Breakfast, Brisket and Belly"	Season 27, Episode 10	Food Network	Self	
2018	Home & Family	● "Sara Rue/Davie Lefevre/Jeremy Fall"	Season 6, Episode 159	Hallmark Channel	Self	
2018	Food Network Star	● "Who Gets a Pilot?" ● "The Newest Star"	Season 14, Episodes 8-9	Food Network	Self	
2021	Beats for Breakfast	● "Avocado Toast" ● "Shakshuka" ● "Beyond Breakfast Burger" ● "French Toast" ● "Gratin Fundido Burrito ● "Bagel Sandwich" ● "Vegetarian Benedict" ● "Breakfast Mac"	Season 14, Episodes 1-8	Facebook Watch	Self, Executive Producer	

== Other media ==
Year	Program	Program Type	Platform(s)	Role	Ref
2018	Purposely Awakened	Podcast	● Spotify	Guest	
2019	Our Los Angeles Podcast	Podcast	● Spotify	Guest	
2021	Redirected with Andrew East	Podcast	● Spotify ● Apple Podcasts	Guest	
2021	Dinner Party with Jeremy Fall	Podcast	● Spotify ● Apple Podcasts	Host	
2021	The Mental Health Coalition's 1-2-1	Series	● The Mental Health Coalition	Guest	

== Awards and recognition ==
- 2016: Zagat 30 under 30
- 2018: Magic Johnson's The Playbook 32 under 32
- 2020: Forbes 30 under 30, Food & Drink
