= Umami Burger =

American restaurant chain

- Type: Private
- Industry: Restaurant
- Founded: 2009; 17 years ago
- Founder: Adam Fleischman
- Headquarters: Los Angeles, California
- Owners: Adam Fleischman; Sam Nazarian; David Nazarian; Fortress Investment Group
- Website: www.umamiburger.com

Umami Burger is a hamburger restaurant chain. The name refers to the umami (savory) flavor. The restaurant was founded by Adam Fleischman, and was formerly part of a larger Umami Restaurant Group. Umami Burger offered waiter service, and most locations had a full bar. Its first restaurant opened in Los Angeles in 2009. As of 2017, Umami Burger had over 25 locations across California, Florida, Illinois, Japan, Nevada, and New York.

In 2016, Sam Nazarian's global hospitality company, SBE Entertainment Group, became the majority shareholder of Umami Restaurant Group and announced plans to accelerate the restaurant's global expansion. In 2021, Alvin Cailan was named the head chef of Umami Burger.

== History ==
Adam Fleischman, an aspiring screenwriter, moved to Los Angeles in 1998. In 2005, while eating a double cheeseburger at In-N-Out Burger, Fleischman pondered the popularity of burger and pizza restaurants in America. The word umami came to mind, a term he had seen on food blogs and in books by British chef Heston Blumenthal. It was then that Fleischman envisioned the financial potential of expanding on the basic burger and its umami properties. At the time, he was managing a wine business, BottleRock Wine Bar in Culver City, which he co-owned and later sold. He then held various consulting positions and started another wine bar.

In 2009, Fleischman went to Mitsuwa Marketplace in West Los Angeles and bought any ingredient he could find with umami properties. He experimented for a month in his kitchen, mixing seaweeds, miso, fish sauce, soy, cheeses, and pungent dried fish with a blender. He then opened his first Umami Burger with $40,000 from the sale of BottleRock. Located in Los Angeles on South La Brea Avenue, it replaced a failed Korean-taco shop.

Fleischman later partnered with hospitality group SBE, Nîmes Capital, and Fortress Investment Group to expand the chain. After multiple openings in Los Angeles, it expanded to the San Francisco Bay Area in 2011. The original La Brea location closed in 2013 after its four-year lease expired; the site could only accommodate 60 people and lacked a liquor license, no longer fitting the company's plans. Later that year, the first East Coast branch opened in Miami Beach, Florida, New York locations were also scheduled to open. By 2019, Umami Burger had expanded into Japan, opening its fifth location in Tokyo and its first in Osaka. Alvin Cailan was named the new head chef of Umami Burger in 2021. By 2024, the chain was reduced to one location in Los Angeles at Los Angeles International Airport, while continuing at food markets in New York and Atlanta, and operating internationally in Paris and Japan.

The logo for the burger chain is an abstract graphic resembling a hamburger bun.

== Menu ==
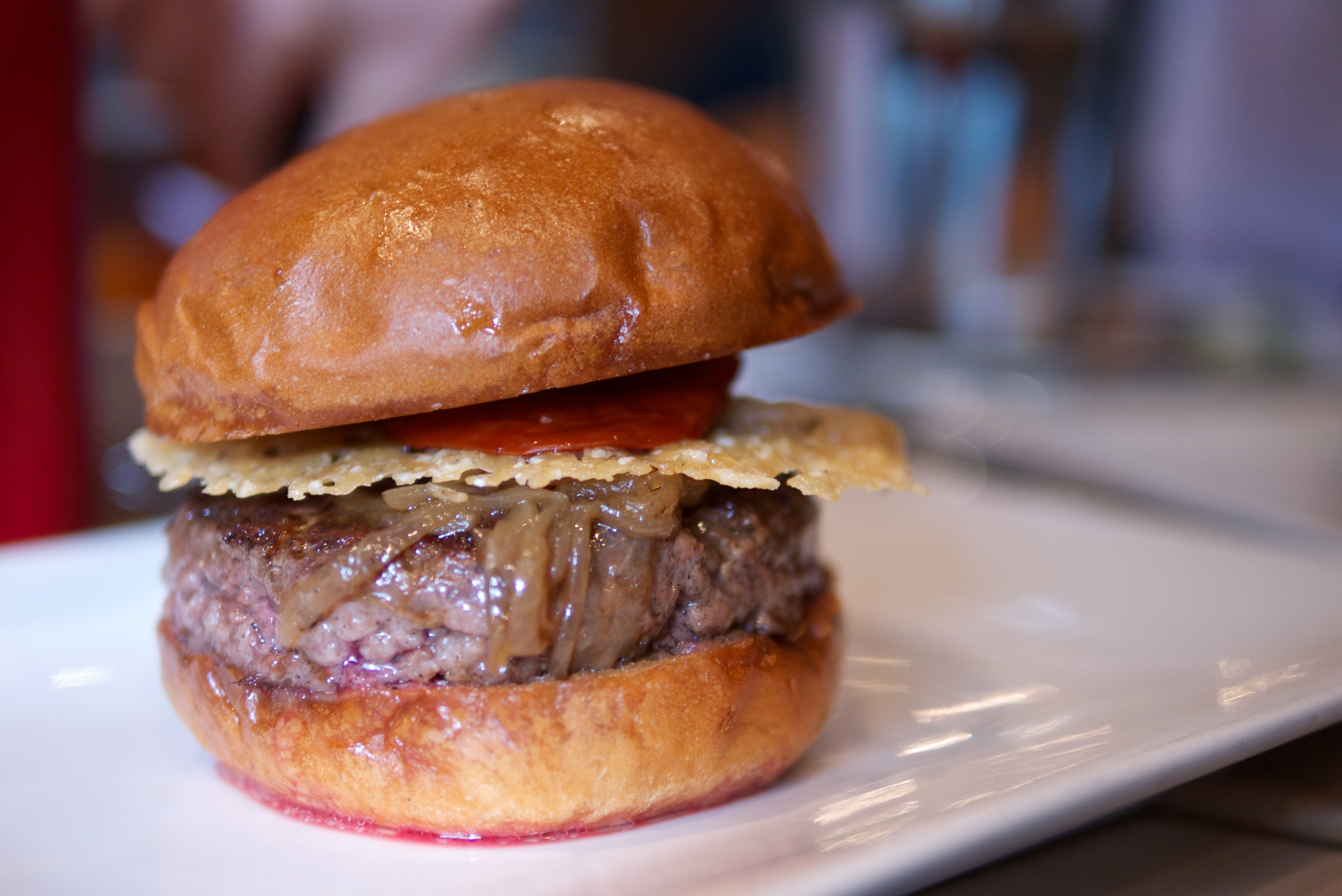
Umami's signature burger featuring a Parmesan crisp and roasted tomato.

The restaurant's burgers are made using 6-ounce (170 g) beef patties, mostly from American Wagyu beef, that are coarsely ground in-house. The meat is seasoned with Umami Sauce—which contains soy sauce—and Umami Dust that includes ground-up dried porcini mushrooms and dried fish heads. Their tomatoes are slow-baked overnight with a soy-based sauce to enhance their flavor. Parmesan, which is also umami-rich, is provided as a cheese crisp. The burgers are served on a soft, Portuguese-style bun.

Umami Burger provides over a dozen different burgers, and substitutions are discouraged. Priced at over $10, their burgers are more expensive than those at fast food restaurants. Their signature Original Burger includes the Parmesan crisp, shiitake mushrooms, roasted tomato, caramelized onions, and a house ketchup. In 2010, Umami Burger was named Burger of the Year by Alan Richman of GQ.

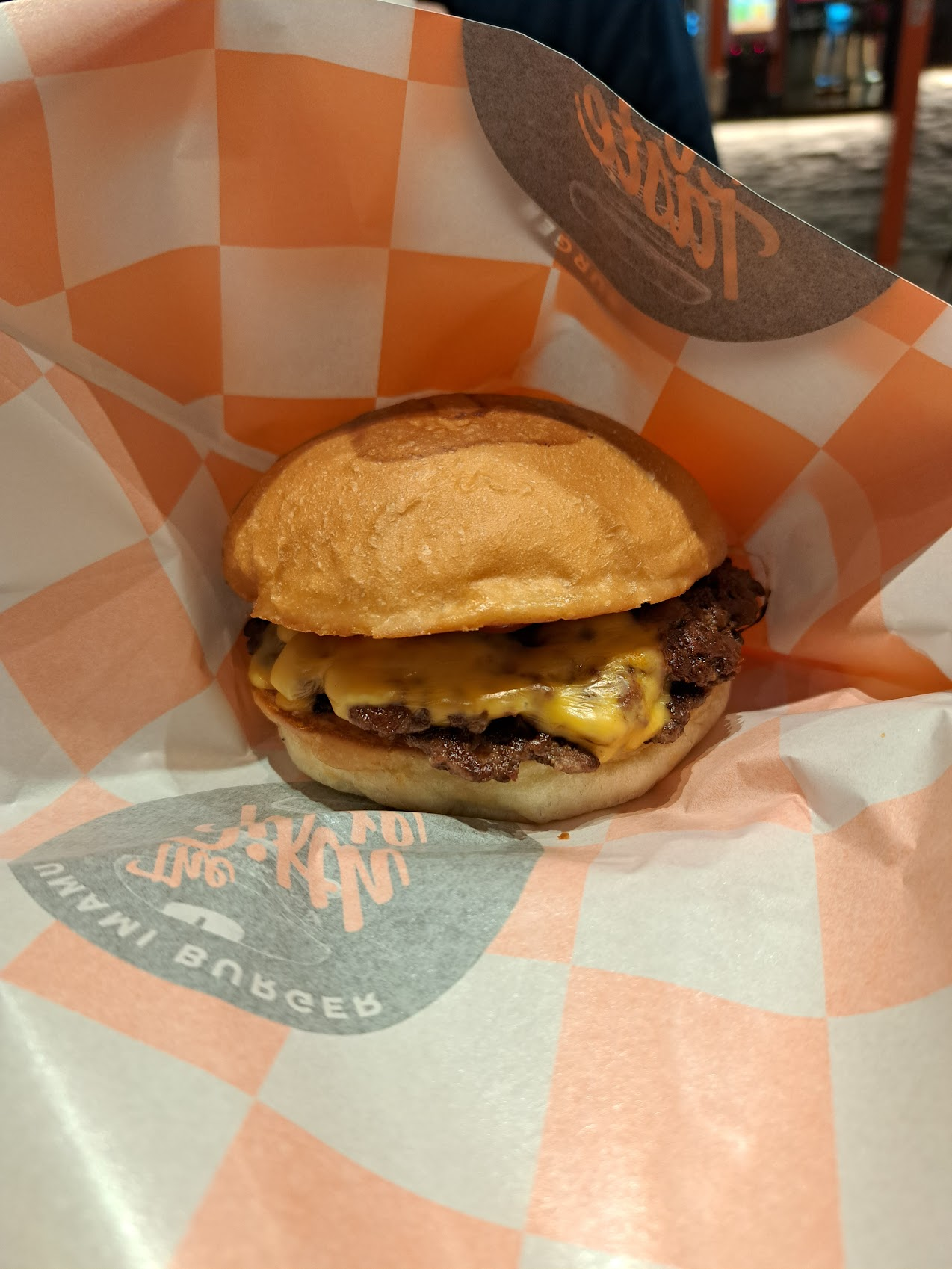
An 'Old Fashion' Burger, only available in Japanese branches

In 2014, Umami restaurants in California announced a partnership with Coolhaus, a Los Angeles-based ice cream sandwich maker, to provide rotating flavors of their ice cream sandwiches on the dessert menu. In May 2017, Umami Burger partnered with Impossible Foods to create the Umami Impossible Burger, an entirely plant-based patty served with caramelized onions, American cheese, miso-mustard, house spread, dill pickles, lettuce, and tomato.

== See also ==
- List of hamburger restaurants
