= Neil Kadisha =

American film producer

- Born: 1955 (age 70–71); Tehran, Iran
- Education: University of Manchester
- Occupation: CEO of Omninet Capital
- Spouse: Dora Kadisha-Nazarian, (after 1979)
- Children: 3
- Relatives: Izak Parviz Nazarian, Younes Nazarian

Neil Kadisha (born 1955) is an American billionaire businessman.

== Early life and education ==
Kadisha was born to a Jewish family in Tehran, Iran. He graduated from the University of Manchester in England.

== Career ==
After graduating from university, Kadisha purchased a major share in Stadco (founded 1941), a high precision aerospace tooling and aircraft component manufacturer, where he has been the company's president and chief executive officer since the late 1970s. In 1981, Kadisha co-founded GNC Industries Inc. which, with additional capital from his father-in-law, Izak Parviz Nazarian, and his uncle-in-law, Younes Nazarian, then purchased Stadco. In 1996, Stadco bought HPM Corporation of Mount Gilead, Ohio, a 120-year-old company that manufactures injection molding presses, extrusion systems and die-casting machines. In 1997, Stadco purchased German injection press maker, Hemscheidt Maschinentechnik Schwerin GmbH & Co.

In 1984, along with his father-in-law and uncle-in-law, Kadisha co-founded the satellite communications company Omninet Corp., and tasked the newly founded company Qualcomm to develop a two-way mobile digital satellite communications system for the trucking industry called OmniTRACS. Kadisha was Chief Executive Officer. Omninet subsequently joined forces with Qualcomm in 1988. Kadisha was on the board of directors of Qualcomm for 14 years, from 1988 to 2002.

Kadisha co-founded Omninet Capital, LLC and is currently a Managing Partner. Over the last 20 years, Omninet, a diversified investment firm with focuses in the fields of wireless communication, private equity and real estate, has developed projects in Los Angeles, San Diego, Phoenix, and Las Vegas. Most recently, he completed construction of a $350 million 45 floor high-rise luxury condominium, named Sky Las Vegas on Las Vegas Boulevard.

He is an executive producer of The Accidental Husband (2008), a romantic comedy film, directed by Griffin Dunne, starring Uma Thurman, Jeffrey Dean Morgan, Colin Firth, Isabella Rossellini, and Sam Shepard.

As of October 2025 he is worth $3.6 billion.

=== Lawsuit ===
Kadisha was required to pay $100 million to Dafna Uzyel, a recently widowed family friend who he had acted as trustee for. The court ruled that since 1988 Kadisha had taken $6.2 million of trust money to replenish his Union Bank credit line, buy real estate, and acquire Qualcomm stock. Kadisha contended that the funds he took from the family's trusts were legitimate loans and paid in full with interest and noted that Uzyel's portfolio actually increased by $20 million under his stewardship.

=== Community organizations ===
Kadisha is on the Board of Directors of several non-profit charitable organizations, which focus on the future of the community, youth development and the care of the elderly.

== Awards and recognition ==
Kadisha has been honored by:

- Citizens’ Empowerment Center in Israel (2003— ), Co-Founder
- The Jewish Federation (1993— ), Board of Directors
  - Executive Committee Member (1995–2005)
- Young Presidents Organization (1995— )
  - Los Angeles Chapter, Member/Board of Directors
- The American Jewish Joint Distribution Committee (2006–2010), Board of Directors
- World’s Presidents Organization (2005— ), Los Angeles Chapter Member
- Phoenix House (2005— ), Board of Directors
