= Murder of Daniel Brophy =

2018 death of American chef

- Location: 45.4897°N 122.8065°W; Portland, Oregon
- Date: June 2, 2018; 8 years ago
- Attack type: Murder by shooting
- Victim: Daniel Craig Brophy
- Perpetrator: Nancy Crampton-Brophy
- Motive: Life insurance payout

Daniel Craig Brophy (June 27, 1954 – June 2, 2018) was an American chef and culinary instructor who was found murdered at the Oregon Culinary Institute in Portland, Oregon, United States. On May 25, 2022, his wife, Nancy Crampton-Brophy, was found guilty of second-degree murder for his death. She was sentenced to life imprisonment.

== Background ==
Daniel Craig Brophy was born on June 27, 1954, in Valley City, North Dakota, United States. He started working at the Oregon Culinary Institute as a lead chef instructor in 2006.

== Murder ==
On the morning of June 2, 2018, Daniel Brophy left for work at the Oregon Culinary Institute, where he was a teacher. Students arrived later and found his body in a kitchen, dead from two gunshots. The death was investigated as a homicide.

== Investigation ==
Nancy Crampton-Brophy

Suspicion later fell on his wife, Nancy Crampton-Brophy (born June 16, 1950). Crampton-Brophy, the daughter of two lawyers, was born and raised in Wichita Falls, Texas, and a graduate of the University of Houston. She met Daniel Brophy after moving to Oregon in the early-1990s and attending the Le Cordon Bleu College of Culinary Arts in Portland, where he worked as an instructor.

Crampton-Brophy had told investigators during the initial investigation that she had walked the dogs and had a shower on the morning of the incident. In 2020, investigators found traffic camera footage that showed her driving to and then departing from the culinary school during a 13-minute window when the homicide happened. Crampton-Brophy amended her story and said she had no memory of such a drive, and that she was likely on a coffee run that she forgot about due to the stress of the day's events.

=== Trial and conviction ===
Nancy Crampton-Brophy was indicted for her husband's murder and was put on trial in April 2022 before the Multnomah County Circuit Court. Crampton-Brophy was the author of several self-published novels including The Wrong Husband and an online essay titled "How to Murder Your Husband", which increased public and media interest in her husband's murder.

At trial, the prosecution assembled a case built on circumstantial evidence that they said indicated Crampton-Brophy was the murderer. They argued that her false account of her whereabouts on the morning of the murder indicated her account was untrustworthy. For motive, prosecutors alleged that Crampton-Brophy was in financial distress and killed her husband for several life insurance policies totaling around $1.4 million as well as sole ownership of their $300,000 house.

Forensic evidence indicated that Daniel Brophy had been shot by two bullets from a Glock pistol. The prosecution entered evidence that Ms. Crampton-Brophy had purchased a receiver blank kit of parts from the Internet. She conceded that she had bought a slide and a barrel for a Glock pistol via eBay. She contended that the purchase had been made with her husband's support, that she had given the gun to her husband to protect himself while looking for mushrooms, and that the gun components were for research on a new novel involving a woman who carefully acquired gun parts.

Nancy Crampton-Brophy was convicted of second degree murder on May 25, 2022. She received a sentence of 25 to life on June 14, 2022.

As of October 2026, Crampton-Brophy remains incarcerated at the Coffee Creek Correctional Facility and continues to serve her life sentences.

== Media depictions ==
In 2023, Lifetime filmed an adaptation of the murder of Daniel Brophy called How to Murder Your Husband: The Nancy Brophy Story. The film stars Cybill Shepherd as Nancy Brophy and Steve Guttenberg as Daniel Brophy.

In January 2023, the case was covered by the A&E series Taking the Stand.

In May 2024, Wondery started a 6-episode podcast called Happily Never After: Dan and Nancy.

In November 2025, the Oxygen series "Killer Grannies" began with the episode "Granny's Fatal Fantasy," which recounts Daniel Brophy's murder by his wife.

On January 31, 2026, the case was covered by the NBC series Dateline in an episode entitled "Murder in Kitchen One".

On October 26, 2026, the case was covered by the CBS series Harlan Coben's Final Twist in an episode entitled "A Recipe for Murder".

== See also ==
- List of homicides in Oregon
