= Red Medicine (restaurant) =

Restaurant information
- Established: 2010
- Closed: 2014
- Previous owners: Jordan Kahn, Noah Ellis, and Adam Fleischman
- Chef: Jordan Kahn
- Food type: Vietnamese cuisine, Nordic cuisine
- Location: Beverly Hills, California

Red Medicine was a fine dining restaurant in Beverly Hills, California. It opened in 2010 and originally served Vietnamese cuisine before changing to Nordic cuisine. It closed in 2014.

== History ==
Red Medicine was opened in 2010 by chef Jordan Kahn, Noah Ellis, and Adam Fleischman. Its name was a reference to the 1995 album Red Medicine by punk rock band Fugazi. Its opening was delayed due to difficulties during construction.

The restaurant was involved in various controversies, including the use of Ho Chi Minh in its original logo, and its practice of making posts on Twitter with the names of guests who made reservations and never arrived, criticizing their behavior.

In December 2010, Ellis refused service to Los Angeles Times food critic Irene Virbila and photographed her, later posting her image on Tumblr with the comment that she was not welcome at the restaurant. Virbila had previously maintained her anonymity for 15 years as a food critic, and the publication of her image created controversy. In an interview with Eater in 2012, Ellis said that they had always intended to refuse Virbila service because she had criticized Kahn's desserts at his previous restaurant.

In May 2014, the restaurant was included on food critic Jonathan Gold's list of the 20 best restaurants. The restaurant was closed on October 31, 2014 and was sold to another set of restaurateurs.

== Description ==
The restaurant was built with exposed concrete walls and incorporated wood taken from barns. It featured high ceilings and industrial style interior design. It was known for being open until 2 a.m. and having a large cocktail menu.

The restaurant originally served Vietnamese cuisine with modern European influences, which was described as "neo-Vietnamese" or "vaguely inspired by the flavors of Vietnam". The menu featured platters and tasting menus with traditional ingredients and modern plating. Kahn was heavily influenced by Nordic cuisine, and incorporated Nordic influences from the start before shifting to become a neo-Nordic restaurant.

The restaurant was also noted for its atmosphere and management ethos, which was described as "slightly punk rockish" in a review by the Los Angeles Times, and "a cocky frat-boy attitude" by Time Out.
