= Genevieve Gaignard =

Visual artist

- Born: 1981 (age 44–45); Orange, Massachusetts
- Education: Massachusetts College of Art and Design (2007), Yale University (2013)
- Known for: Photography, Videography, Installation
- Website: http://www.genevievegaignard.com

Genevieve Gaignard, born in Orange, Massachusetts in 1981, is best known for work exploring issues of race, class, and gender. As a self-identified mixed-race woman, Gaignard utilizes photography, videography, and installation to explore the overlap of black and white America through staged environments and character performances. She received an AAS in Baking & Pastry Arts from Johnson & Wales University, her BA in photography from the Massachusetts College of Art and Design in 2007, and an MFA from Yale University in 2014. Gaignard's work is represented by Susanne Vielmetter Los Angeles Projects, and has been shown at Shulamit Nazarian, The Cabin, The FLAG Art Foundation, The California African American Museum, The Foley Gallery, and at two residentially-owned art spaces in Los Angeles, CA. She was also included in the fourth iteration of the triennial Prospect New Orleans, in 2018, with an installation at the Ace Hotel New Orleans. Her work has been featured in The New York Times and The Los Angeles Times. Gaignard's photographic series draw inspiration from Carrie Mae Weems, Diane Arbus, Cindy Sherman, and Nikki S. Lee, remixed with the references to the selfie and Instagram culture.

== Early life ==
Born and raised in a Massachusetts mill town by a white mother and black father, Gaignard grew up between black and white cultures. Before enrolling at the Massachusetts College of Art and Design, Gaignard first enrolled at Johnson & Wales University in Providence, Rhode Island, in their baking and pastry program. She became interested in pursuing the arts after one of her professors became her mentor. Her professor created alternative assignments for Gaignard, reintroduced her to mediums such as collage, and opened Gaignard to experimentation in installation. According to Gaignard, she “went through this phase where Abercrombie & Fitch was really cool, I would rip pages out of the catalog and collage my whole wall with half naked guys.” Gaignard began investigating racial dynamics with the use of composed environments and fabricated characters.

Gaignard began photographing her family and neighbors as she transitioned into the Massachusetts College of Art and Design. For a week of assignments “dealing with flesh,” Gaignard used her mother as a subject.

Following her graduation in 2007, she applied to Yale University where she was wait-listed. Her anxiety surrounding her admission status motivated her to experiment with video art, where she created offbeat films. After she was eventually accepted, Gaignard transitioned back to photographic mediums with the added juxtaposition of installation. Yale's predominantly white student body contrasted sharply with the culturally diverse city of New Haven, prompting Gaignard to think through how to balance her two ethnicities. During her time at Yale, she began incorporating the intensity of race and storytelling in her work: “My expression as a person of color is different than others. I have something to say...The stuff I say now sort of addresses a lot of feelings I had as a child.” It was through her exploration of race and family relations that she began creating personas staged in elaborate domestic interiors.

== Work ==
As an emerging artist, Gaignard first garnered wider attention with her 2016 exhibition Smell the Roses at the California African American Museum in Los Angeles. The exhibition included a number of photographs of Gaignard dressed as a variety of characters alongside two elaborate room-sized installations, one of them a bedroom with a daybed covered in Cabbage Patch Kids dolls. Of the nine photographs featured in the exhibition, "Extra Value (After Venus)", shows Gaignard against a painted American flag holding a McDonald's cup and fries; another depicts Gaignard as a small-town housewife holding a watermelon in front of a discount store.

Gaignard explores racial “passing” and gender to address the difficulties of being a mixed race woman in American society. While Gaignard's work is said to be similar to Cindy Sherman and Carrie Mae Weems, she prefers not to be compared to them. Like Weems, Gaignard's works focuses on black female bodies and their place within society. Gaignard's digital photographs utilize pop culture references and selfie culture to examine mixed race identity and black womanhood. She consistently questions mass media and how it presents white and black cultures by pushing contrasts in her fictitious, femme characters.

Gaignard blends her digital photography with installations evoking the ideal family home. She states, “When I make an installation, I want it to be somewhere between a Wes Anderson film and Harmony Korine’s Gummo: gross and perfect at the same time but those are also super white references—so, that’s always my challenge.”

Gaignard exaggerates elements of her personas, posing racial anxieties for viewers through parallel perspectives of her own self-identity. Although racial contrast is important to her characters and her overall work, Gaignard also blurs the lines between representations of black and white women by drawing on current and past pop culture references. By blending representations, stereotypes, and taking inspiration from drag culture, she further challenges beauty standard norms, while also showing others the “invisibility” she faced growing up.

Gaignard's work is in a number of public collections, including the Allen Memorial Art Museum, Nasher Museum of Art, California African American Museum, Pérez Art Museum Miami, Studio Museum in Harlem, and San Jose Museum of Art.

== Exhibitions ==
Group Exhibitions
	Exhibit Name	Venue	Year
1	Yale MFA First-Year Student Exhibition	Yale School of Art: Green Hall Gallery Location: New Haven, Connecticut	2013
2	Yale MFA Second-Year Student Exhibition	Yale School of Art: Green Hall Gallery Location: New Haven, Connecticut	2013
3	13 Artists	Yale School of Art Location: New Haven, Connecticut	2014
4	Deep End Yale MFA Photography Thesis	Yale School of Art: Green Hall Gallery, The FLAG Art Foundation, Diane Rosenstein Gallery	2014
5	Shaq Loves People	Expose Chicago Note: Curated by Shaquille O'Neal Location: Chicago, Illinois	2014
6	The New New	Diane Rosenstein Gallery Location: Los Angeles, California	2014
7	Other Spaces	dc3 Location: Edmonton, Alberta, Canada	2016
8	Summer School	The FLAG Art Foundation Location: New York, New York	2016
9	Industry	dc3 Location: Edmonton, Alberta, Canada	2017
10	Comm | Alt | Shift	Aljira Center for Contemporary Art Location: Newark, New Jersey	2017
11	Face to Face: Los Angeles Collects Portraiture	California African American Museum Location: Los Angeles, California	2017
12	Fictions	Studio Museum Location: Harlem, New York	2017
13	Opening the Trap	Interface Gallery Location: San Francisco, California	2018
14	Forms & Alterations	808 Gallery at Boston University Location: Boston, Massachusetts	2018
15	Fun House	Josh Lilley Gallery Location: London, United Kingdom	2018
16	Talisman in the Age of Difference	Stephen Friedman Gallery Location: London, United Kingdom	2018
17	In This Imperfect Present Moment	Seattle Art Museum	2018
18	People Get Ready	Nasher Museum of Art at Duke University Location: Durham, North Carolina	2018
19	Radically Ordinary: Scenes from Black Life in America Since 1968	Allen Memorial Art Museum Location: Oberlin, Ohio	2018
20	Daegu Biennale	Daegu Location: Daegu, South Korea	2018
21	Personal Space	Crystal Bridges Museum of American Art Location:Bentonville, Arkansas	2018
22	Parallels and Peripheries	ArtCenter Location: Miami, Florida	2018
23	Terres de Femmes	Praz-Delavallade Location: Paris, France	2018

Solo Exhibitions
	Exhibit Name	Venue	Year
1	A Golden State of Mind	Diane Rosenstein Presents at The Cabin LA Location: Los Angeles, California	2015
2	Us Only	Shulamit Nazarian Location: Los Angeles, California	2015
3	Smell the Roses	California African American Museum Location: Los Angeles, California	2016
4	The Powder Room	Shulamit Nazarian Location: Los Angeles, California	2017
5	In Passing	Houston Center for Photography Location: Houston Texas	2017
6	Grassroots	Prospect 4 Location: New Orleans, Louisiana	2017
7	Hidden Fences	Praz-Delavallade Location: Paris, France	2018
8	Counterfeit Currency	The FLAG Art Foundation Location: New York, New York	2018
