= Melrose Market =

Retail market in Seattle, Washington, U.S.

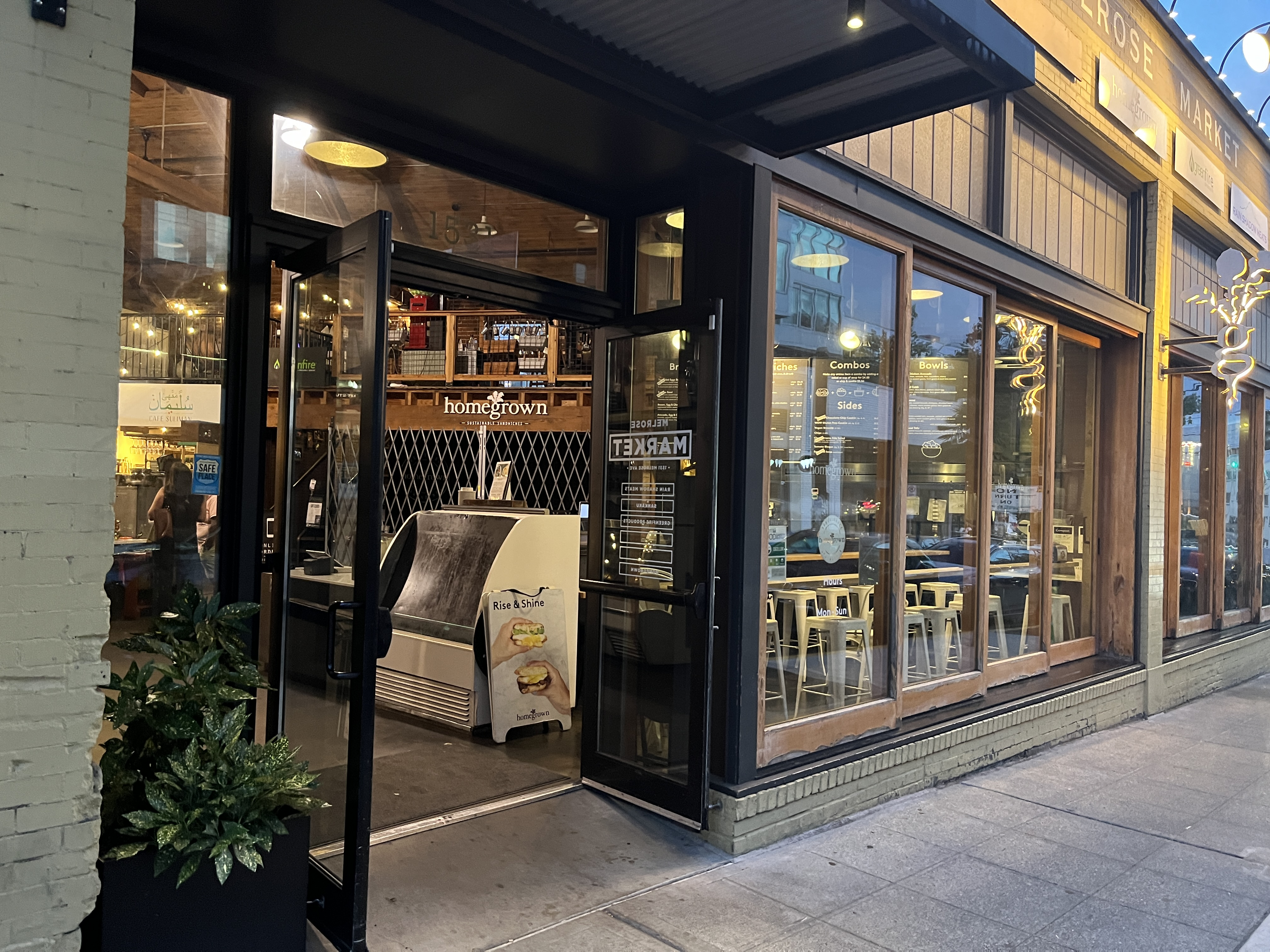
- An entrance to the market, 2024
- Location: 1527 Melrose Ave; Capitol Hill, Seattle, Washington; 47.61488°N 122.32810°W
- Opening date: 2010
- Developer: Scott Shapiro
- Environment: Indoor marketplace
- Days normally open: Daily
- Number of tenants: 20
- Total retail floor area: 21,068 square feet (1,957.3 m^{2})
- Website: melrosemarketseattle.com
- Interactive map of Melrose Market

Melrose Market is a market on Seattle's Capitol Hill, in the U.S. state of Washington. It opened in 2010.

Scott Shapiro has been credited as a co-developer of Melrose Market. Among tenants are Cafe Suliman and Taylor Shellfish Company.

The market hosted a holiday bazaar and night market in 2019.

The restaurant chain Eggslut opened a location in Melrose Market in 2025.
