= Alvin Cailan =

American chef and YouTuber

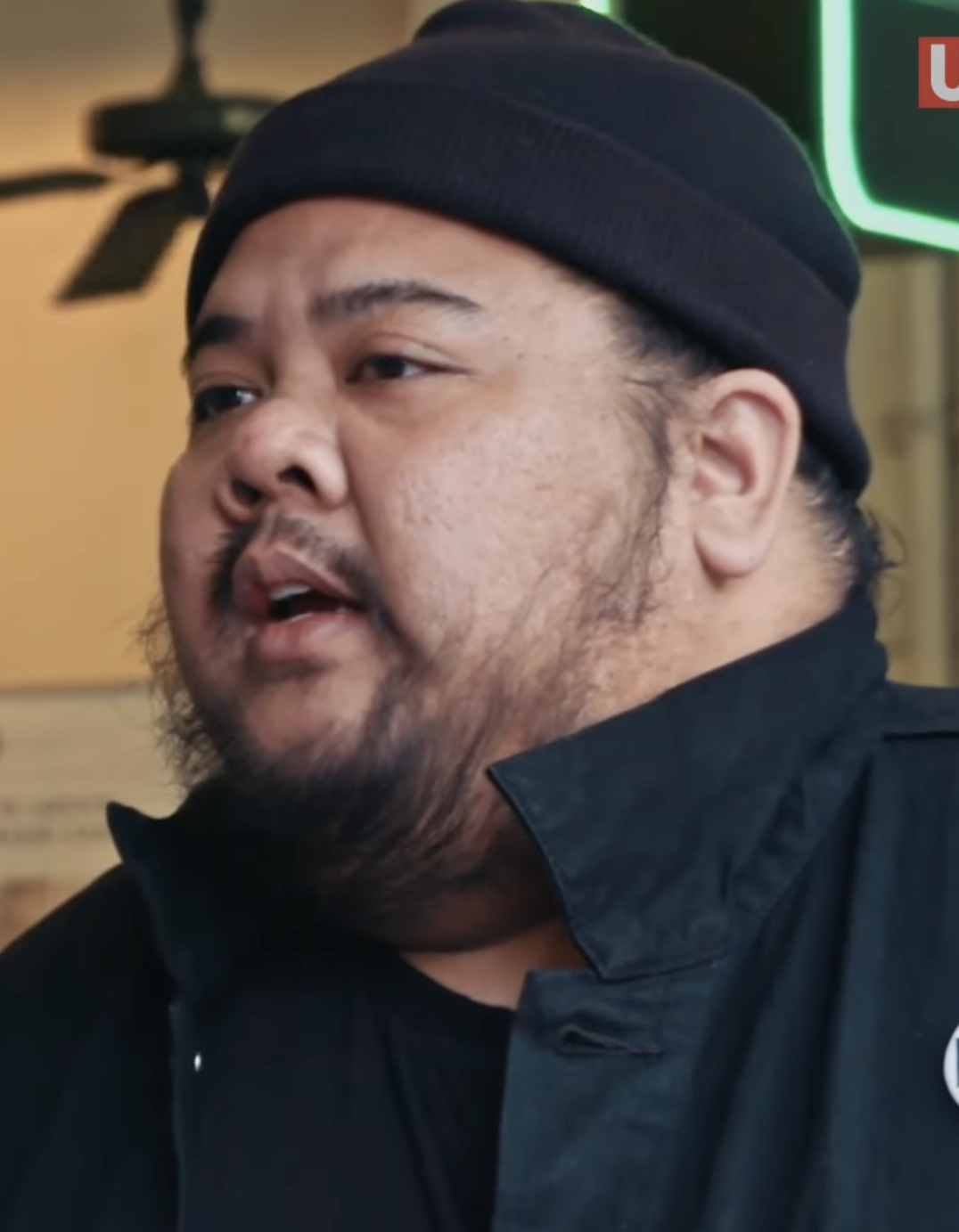
- Cailan in 2017
- Born: January 1983 (age 43); Los Angeles County, California
- Education: California State University; Oregon Culinary Institute
- Culinary career
- Current restaurant(s): Eggslut (multiple locations), Umami Burger, Amboy, Greenlight Burgers
- Website: www.alvincailan.com

Alvin Cailan (born 1983) is an American chef, author, and television host. He is the host of First We Feast’s The Burger Show which airs on YouTube and Hulu. Cailan launched Eggslut, a food truck that specialized in egg sandwiches. The food truck quickly became popular and often had waits that stretched to two hours long. Eggslut has brick-and-mortar locations, including at Los Angeles' Grand Central Market and Venice, Glendale, and Las Vegas. Cailan was named the head chef of Umami Burger in 2021.

== Early life and education ==
Alvin Cailan grew up in Pico Rivera, California in a Filipino household. To keep him out of trouble, Cailan's parents got him a job washing dishes at a retreat house, a kitchen that fed 150 people every day. By the time he was a senior in high school, Cailan was cooking and serving as kitchen manager.

Cailan studied business at California State University, Fullerton. He worked for a construction company. The company was corrupt and paid Cailan two years severance so he would not be a whistleblower regarding the company's business practices. He then moved to Oregon and attended the Oregon Culinary Institute.

== Career ==
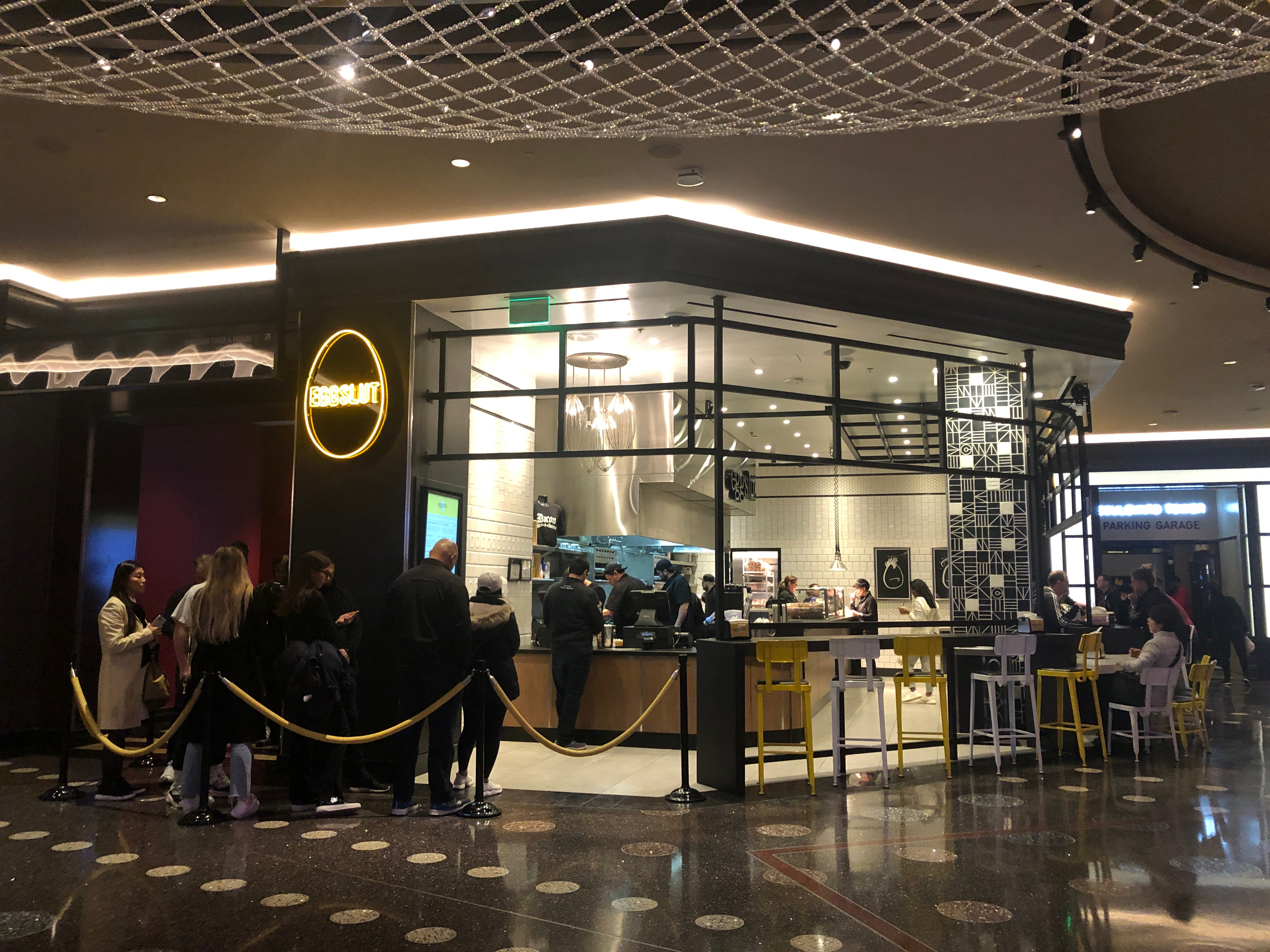
Eggslut in Las Vegas

After culinary school Cailan worked at Olympia Provisions in Portland, Oregon; followed by Bouchon, and The French Laundry in Yountville, California.

In 2011 Cailan founded Eggslut, an egg sandwich food truck in Los Angeles, with his cousin. In 2013, Eggslut opened its first brick-and-mortar location in Los Angeles's Grand Central Market. MSNBC declared Eggslut the most Instagrammed restaurant in the world, and Bon Appétit named it one of the Top 50 best Restaurants in the United States. As of 2025, Eggslut has a number of stores around the world including in Tokyo, London, Kuwait, Korea and Singapore.

Cailan's cookbook titled Amboy: Recipes from the Filipino-American Dream was published by Houghton Mifflin Harcourt in August 2020.

In 2021, Cailan was named the new head chef of Umami Burger.

In November 2025, Cailan opened Greenlight Burgers, a burger restaurant, in the Philippines.
