= Cliché Magazine =

American fashion magazine

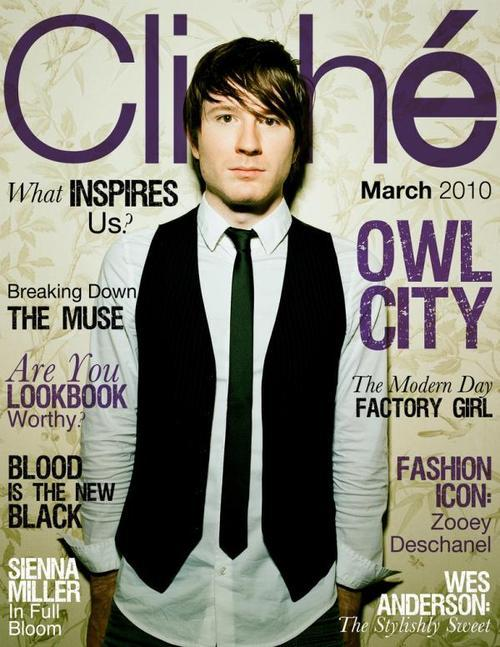
- Owl City on the cover of the March 2010 issue
- editor-in-chief: Quavondo Nguyen
- Categories: Fashion, music, culture, entertainment
- Frequency: Monthly
- Circulation: 600,000+
- Founded: 2009
- Country: United States
- Language: English
- Website: http://www.clichemag.com

Cliché Magazine is a digital fashion magazine that focuses on fashion, music, lifestyle, entertainment, and culture. Based in Los Angeles and Las Vegas, the magazine releases monthly issues exclusively on digital platforms.

== Basic information ==
The magazine was founded by Jeremy Fall as editor-in-chief and premiered on June 1, 2009. Fall founded Cliché at the age of 18, initially as a side project, while working as an event producer. According to Fall, the magazine reached one million unique views in December 2009. On June 1, 2011, after a year-long hiatus, the magazine was relaunched in a new format that allowed for audio and video embedding. Head photographer Dirk Mai produces cover editorials as well as other exclusive content for the magazine.

Richard Corbett became the new proprietor of Cliché in December 2011, and Megan Portorreal took the reins as editor-in-chief of the magazine In October 2012, Wilson Greene joined the Cliché team as a managing partner and COO. In May 2012, Cliché assigned Quavondo Nguyen to their team as creative director and head photographer. With a design and photography background, Quavondo was able to provide creative insights to help the company rebrand its product. In the summer of 2013, Cliché relaunched with a new visual identity, including logo, website and magazine redesign. Quavondo left Cliché in 2018 but returned in 2020 as the editor-in-chief.

== Print is Dead campaign ==
In December 2009, the magazine released its "Print is Dead, Get Over It" campaign. In light of the online publication boom, Cliché's print issues were in high demand. In addition to its website, Cliché is also available as an iPhone and iPod touch application.

== Environmental Efforts ==
Its August 2009 issue, titled "The Green Issue", focused on providing environmental conservation tips as well as highlighting eco-friendly brands such as Tom's Shoes.

== Other brands ==
In addition to the magazine, Cliché used to run the blog Hello Kitsch, which was presented in a daily format and included additional personal content between issues. The blog posts have now been digitalized.

Cliché TV was created as a way to promote independent artists and showcase webisodes, models, and other video-related projects.

== Cover models ==
Cliché's covers have featured a wide range of appearances, including Brittany Flickinger, Mandy Jiroux, Tiësto, actress Torrey DeVitto, and the band The Maine.
