= David Nazarian =

American investor

- Born: 1961 (age 64–65); Tehran, Imperial State of Iran
- Education: California State University, Northridge; USC Marshall School of Business
- Occupations: Founder & CEO of Nimes Capital
- Spouse: Angella Maddahi
- Children: 2 sons
- Parent(s): Younes Nazarian; Soraya Nazarian
- Relatives: Izak Parviz Nazarian (uncle); Sam Nazarian (brother); Shulamit Nazarian (sister); Emina Cunmulaj (sister-in-law)
- Website: NimesCapital.com

David Nazarian is an American businessman, investor and philanthropist.

== Early life ==
David Nazarian was born circa 1961 in Tehran, Iran. His father, Younes Nazarian, was a businessman and philanthropist. His mother, Soraya Nazarian, is a philanthropist. His paternal uncle, Izak Parviz Nazarian, was also a businessman and philanthropist. Nazarian immigrated to the United States with his parents during the Iranian Revolution of 1979.

He graduated from California State University, Northridge, where he received a Bachelor of Science degree in Business Administration in 1982. He received a Master of Business Administration from the USC Marshall School of Business.

== Career ==
Nazarian is the founder of Nîmes Capital, an investment firm, and serves as its chief executive officer. Nazarian and his family became early major shareholders of Qualcomm when one of their investments joined forces with the communication company in 1988. He acquired real estate from the Resolution Trust Corporation in the first half of the 1990s. Additionally, he acquired hotels in the early 2000s and sold them for profit in 2008. He has also created venture funds that invested in wireless and broadband technology as well as clean energy. In 2012, Nîmes Capital acquired TD Food Group, a fast food company which owns and operates Pizza Hut and Taco Bell restaurants in Hawaii, Guam and Saipan, from Brentwood Associates. Nîmes sold the company to Restaurant Brands New Zealand in 2017 for a reported $105 million. In 2018, Nazarian acquired a portfolio of mid-sized operating companies and real estate holdings focused on multi-family, student housing and hotel assets. Nîmes Real Estate, a subsidiary of his Nazarian Enterprises, in 2021 had $1 billion in acquisitions.

== Philanthropy ==
He serves on the board of governors of Cedars-Sinai Medical Center. He serves as the chair of the investment committee and a member of the board of directors of the UCLA Foundation. He also serves on the board of leaders of the USC Marshall School of Business and the Harvard Graduate School Leadership Institute.

With his wife, he endowed the David and Angella Nazarian Youth Leadership Program at Sinai Temple, a conservative synagogue in Westwood, for children from the 9th to the 12th grade. In 2014, they were also honored for their Jewish and pro-Israel philanthropy by Hillel 818, the chapter of Hillel: The Foundation for Jewish Campus Life for students at California State University, Northridge (CSUN), Pierce College and the Los Angeles Valley College. Additionally, they endowed the Angella and David Nazarian Social Innovators in Residence program at the Wharton School of the University of Pennsylvania.

In 2014, he made a charitable contribution of $10 million to his alma mater, CSUN. He also chairs a campaign to fundraise an additional $15 million. As a result, the CSUN David Nazarian College of Business and Economics was named in his honor. He was also a member of the leadership board of the Terasaki Institute for Biomedical Innovation.

== Personal life ==
He is married to Angella Maddahi, a former academic, non-fiction author, conference organizer and philanthropist. They have two sons.

== Awards ==
Nazarian and his wife Angella were recipients of the 2018 Ellis Island Medal of Honor, which are awarded to “American citizens whom exemplify a life dedicated to community service. These are individuals who preserve and celebrate the history, traditions and values of their ancestry while exemplifying the values of the American way of life, and who are dedicated to creating a better world for us all.”
