= Katsuya Uechi =

Japanese chef and restaurateur (1959–2026)

- Born: 3 January 1959; Okinawa, Japan
- Died: 24 June 2026 (aged 67); Los Angeles, California, U.S.
- Culinary career
- Cooking style: Sushi
- Previous restaurant: Katsuya
- Website: www.katsuyarestaurant.com

Katsuya Uechi (3 January 1959 – 24 June 2026) was a Japanese chef and restaurateur who co-founded the upscale sushi brand Katsuya. He was known for his innovative approach to Japanese cuisine and popularized Japanese-American fusion dishes, most notably "spicy tuna on crispy rice".

== Early life ==
Uechi was born in 1959 in Okinawa, Japan where he developed an early interest in the culinary arts. He trained in traditional Edomae sushi techniques in Okinawa and Osaka before moving to the United States in 1984.

== Career ==
In 2006, Uechi partnered with the luxury hospitality company SBE (founded by Sam Nazarian) and renowned French designer Philippe Starck to launch "Katsuya" in Brentwood, California. The Katsuya brand expanded and opened locations in Hollywood, Las Vegas, Miami, and across the Middle East.

He is widely recognized as one of the early pioneers of the "spicy tuna on crispy rice" dish, which became popular in Japanese restaurants in the United States.

== Death ==
Uechi died on 24 June 2026.

== See also ==
- Japanese cuisine
- Sushi
- Fusion cuisine
