= Adam Fleischman =

American businessman

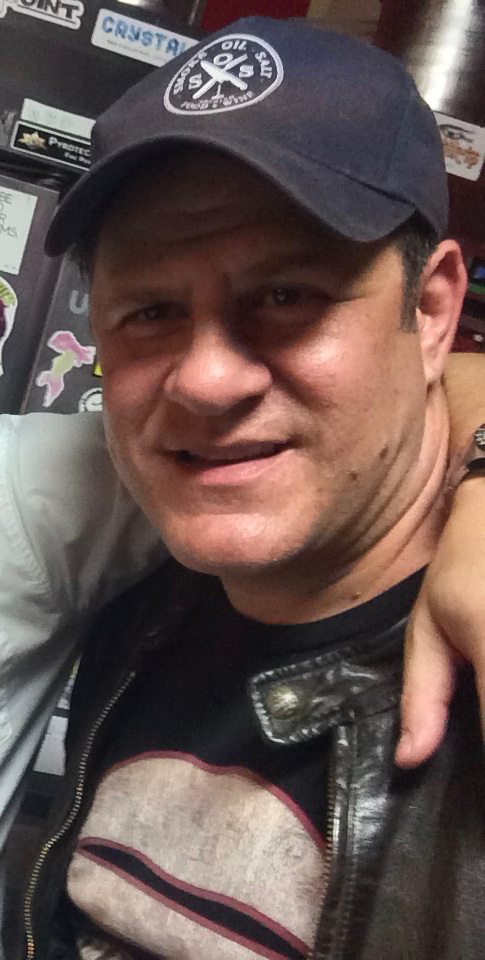
- Fleischman in 2015
- Born: 1969 or 1970 (age 56–57); Queens, New York, U.S.
- Education: University of Maryland
- Occupation: Restaurateur
- Known for: Umami Burger

Adam Fleischman (born 1969 or 1970) is an American restaurateur who is best known as the founder the Umami Burger chain. He also formed other Los Angeles area boutique and fast casual restaurants, such as PBJ.LA which served unusual combination nut butter and jelly sandwiches; and Slow Burn a pan-Asian smokehouse.

== Early life ==
Fleischman was born in Queens, New York, and grew up in Silver Spring, Maryland. He graduated from the University of Maryland with a liberal arts degree. In 1998, he moved to Los Angeles with aspirations of becoming a screenwriter.

== Restaurants ==
During the 2000s Fleischman was a co-owner of wine bars BottleRock and Vinoteque in Los Angeles. He sold his stake, and with the financial freedom it afforded looked for a new food venture.

In 2009, Fleischman founded Umami Burger in Los Angeles. In 2011, SBE Entertainment Group acquired a stake of Umami Burger equal to that of Fleischman's. In 2012, Fleischman partnered with chef Anthony Carron to found 800 Degrees Pizza under the umbrella of the newly formed Umami Restaurant Group, which comprised to the two restaurant chains. In 2014, Fleischman stepped down as CEO of Umami Restaurant Group. In 2016, SBE acquired a majority of Umami Restaurant Group and Fleischman remained as a board member and minority stock holder. At the time, Umami Burger had 24 locations domestically with plans to expand internationally and 800 Degrees had about 6 restaurants.

In 2013, Fleischman founded AdVantage Restaurant Partners with friend Lee Weinberg. They collaborated with brand creators to bring restaurants to fruition. As of 2015, these brands included Fat Noddle, Choco Chicken, Chop Daddy's, Smoke.Oil.Salt and Tacoteca.

In 2017, Fleischman opened PBJ.LA in Grand Central Market in Los Angeles, which offered a variety of nut butter and jelly sandwiches. In April 2023, the PBJ.LA official Facebook account posted that the restaurant had closed.

In 2022, Fleischman opened Slow Burn in Echo Park, Los Angeles, a "pan-Asian smokehouse". It closed three weeks after opening without explanation.

== Other ventures ==
Fleischman co-wrote the 2016 cookbook Flavor Bombs: The Umami Ingredients That Make Taste Explode.

== Personal life ==
In 2023, Fleischman was accused of squatting in a Hollywood Hills house. The owner had made an agreement with Fleischman to rent the house for occasional dinner parties as a way to generate revenue - she would provide the house and he would provide clients. However according to Fleischman, he had a verbal agreement to also live there, and because there was no rental agreement, he was not legally required to pay rent. He left only after she was assisted by a professional "squatter remover" by the name of Flash Shelton, founder of Squatter Hunters.

== Publications ==
- Fleischman, Adam; Nguyen, Tien (2018). Flavor Bombs: The Umami Ingredients That Make Taste Explode. Harvest. ISBN 978-0544784895.
