= Younes Nazarian =

Iranian-American businessman and philanthropist (1931–2022)

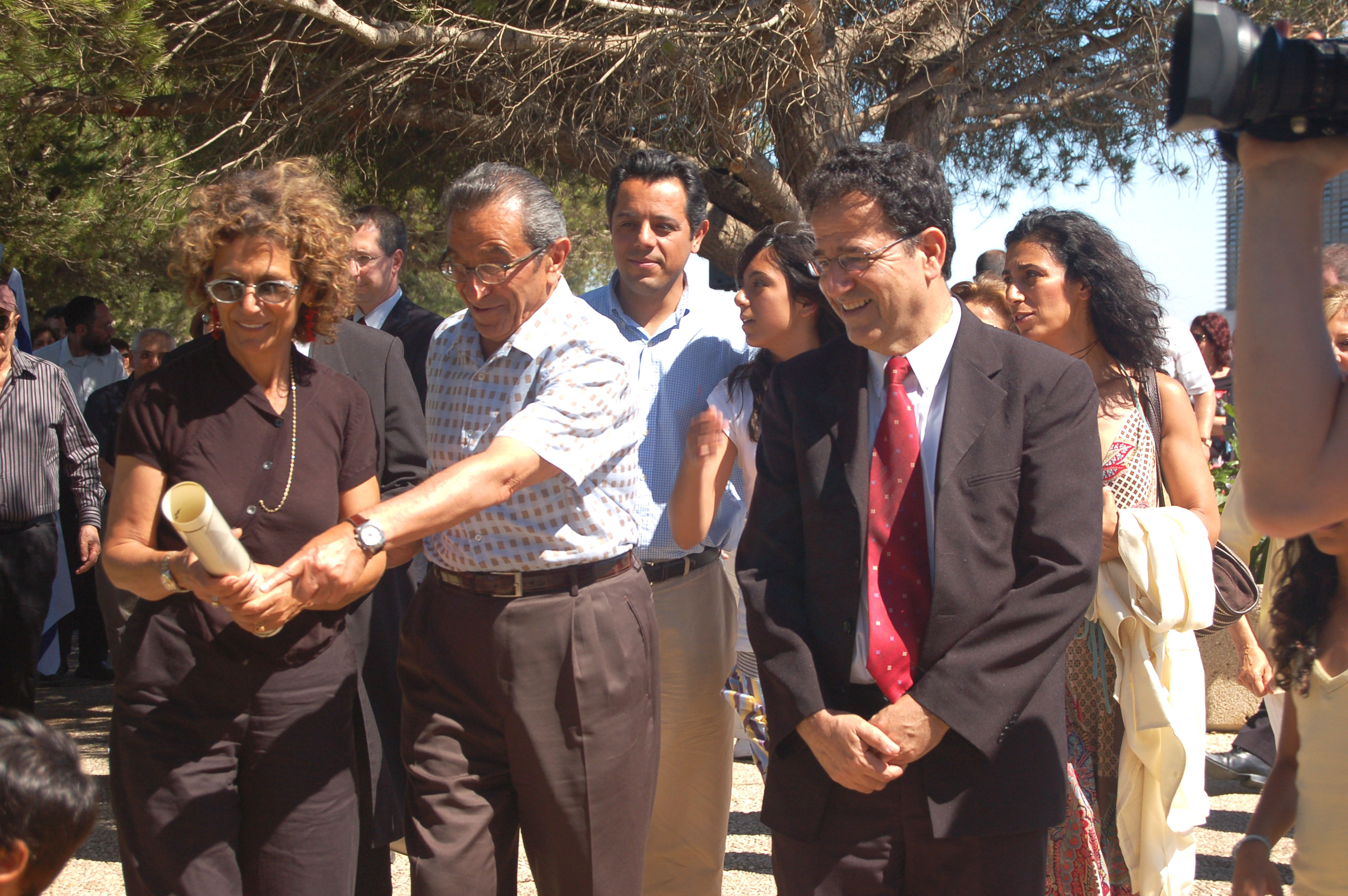
- Younes and Soraya Nazarian at a 2007 cornerstone-laying ceremony for a new wing of the Younes and Soraya Nazarian Library
- Born: January 26, 1931; Tehran, Iran
- Died: March 18, 2022 (aged 91); Los Angeles, California, U.S.
- Occupation: Chairman of Nazarian Enterprises
- Spouse: Soraya Nazarian
- Children: David Nazarian; Sam Nazarian; Shula Nazarian; Sharon Nazarian
- Relatives: Izak Parviz Nazarian (brother); Angella Nazarian (daughter-in-law)
- Website: SBE.com

Younes Nazarian (January 26, 1931 – March 18, 2022) was an Iranian-American businessman, investor, and philanthropist. An early investor in Qualcomm, he was the chairman of Nazarian Enterprises. He was also a major donor to charitable causes in California and Israel.

== Early life ==
Younes Nazarian was born in Tehran, Iran on January 26, 1931, the son of Golbahar and Davoud Nazarian. His father died when he was three years old. After losing his fortune amassed as a construction contractor during the Iranian Revolution of 1979, he immigrated to the United States with his brother Izak Parviz Nazarian, settling in Beverly Hills, California.

== Career ==
Upon arriving in the United States in 1980, Younes Nazarian's entrepreneurial acumen led him to become co-owner of Stadco, a tool and die manufacturing company in the aerospace industry. He bought into Omninet, a technology company that had developed a wireless protocol that enabled trucking companies to keep track of their vehicles. By recognizing its potential, he presented the technology to Qualcomm founder Irwin M. Jacobs who offered Nazarian a major stake in Qualcomm in exchange for Omninet. As an early investor, he served on the Board of Directors of San Diego–based Qualcomm, a leader in wireless telecommunications, R&D, and the largest fabless chip supplier in the world.

Younes Nazarian was the chairman of Nazarian Enterprises which focuses on the diversification of assets across a variety of interests in the private, public, and real estate markets. Key industries include aerospace, manufacturing and logistics, technology, hospitality, and alternative energy, among others. He also served as the secretary of the board of directors of ANG, Inc., a manufacturer of military products headquartered in Manchester, New Hampshire.

== Philanthropy ==
Younes Nazarian was the founder of the Younes & Soraya Nazarian Family Foundation and its Israeli sister organization, the Ima Foundation. His daughter, Sharon Nazarian, serves as the foundation's President.

Younes Nazarian was the former chairman of the board of governors of the Jerusalem Academy of Music and Dance (JAMD) and the Haifa Foundation.^{[3]} One JAMD building is named after Younes & Soraya Nazarian. He also served on the board of directors of the Sapir Academic College, where the Younes & Soraya Nazarian Academic Library is named in his honor. The Younes and Soraya Nazarian Pre-Academic Library Of the Ima Foundation at the Hebrew University of Jerusalem is also named in his honor.

In 2007, he donated $119,000 to the University of Haifa in the form of 119 scholarships of $1,000 to commemorate the Israeli casualties of the 2006 Lebanon War. That same year, he received an Honorary Doctorate of Philosophy from the university. Additionally, he served as a member of the "Public Standing from abroad" on its board of governors. In mid 2017, Younes donated $17,000,000 to the Valley Performing Arts Center at California State University, Northridge. The performing arts center will have a name change in honor of Younes' wife, Soraya (it will also be known as "The Soraya").

Younes Nazarian endowed the Beit Midrash Fellowship at the Milken Community High School in Bel Air. He has also endowed the Younes & Soraya Nazarian Center for Israel Studies at the University of California, Los Angeles (UCLA). The Nazarian Pavilion in the Doheny Library on the campus of the University of Southern California (USC) was also built as a result of a charitable gift from Nazarian. In 2017, Nazarian and his wife donated $17 million to the California State University, Northridge, where the Valley Performing Arts Centre was renamed the Younes and Soraya Nazarian Center for the Performing Arts.

Younes Nazarian was the former chairman of the Habib Levy Cultural & Educational Foundation. He served on the board of trustees of the Jewish Federation and Jewish Television Network. He has served at the Sinai Temple, a Conservative synagogue in Westwood.

Younes Nazarian served on the Advisory Board of the Center for Middle East Public Policy at the RAND Corporation. He served on the board of directors for the Friends of IDF, a fundraising non-profit organization for the Israel Defense Forces.

Younes Nazarian obtained honorary doctorate degrees from the University of Haifa and California State University, Northridge, where the performing arts center is named in their honor.

Younes Nazarian received Israel's highest honor of the Torch Lighting Ceremony on Mount Hertzl, generally only given to Israeli-born citizens, and was also the recipient of the 2011 Ellis Island Medal of Honor.

== Personal life ==
Younes Nazarian was married to Soraya Sarah Nazarian, for 61 years. They have four children David Nazarian, Shulamit Nazarian, Sharon Nazarian, and Sam Nazarian. Additional family members include daughters-in-law Angella Nazarian and Emina Cunmulaj Nazarian, sons-in-law Fernando Flint and Matt Oshinsky.

Younes and Soraya Sarah Nazarian have eleven grandchildren Ariel, Aaron, Phillip, Elan, Sarah, Eli, Layla, Adam, Ella, Mia, Sha; and great-grandson Lev.

== Death ==
Nazarian died on March 18, 2022, at his home in Los Angeles, California, at the age of 91.
