= Sky Las Vegas =

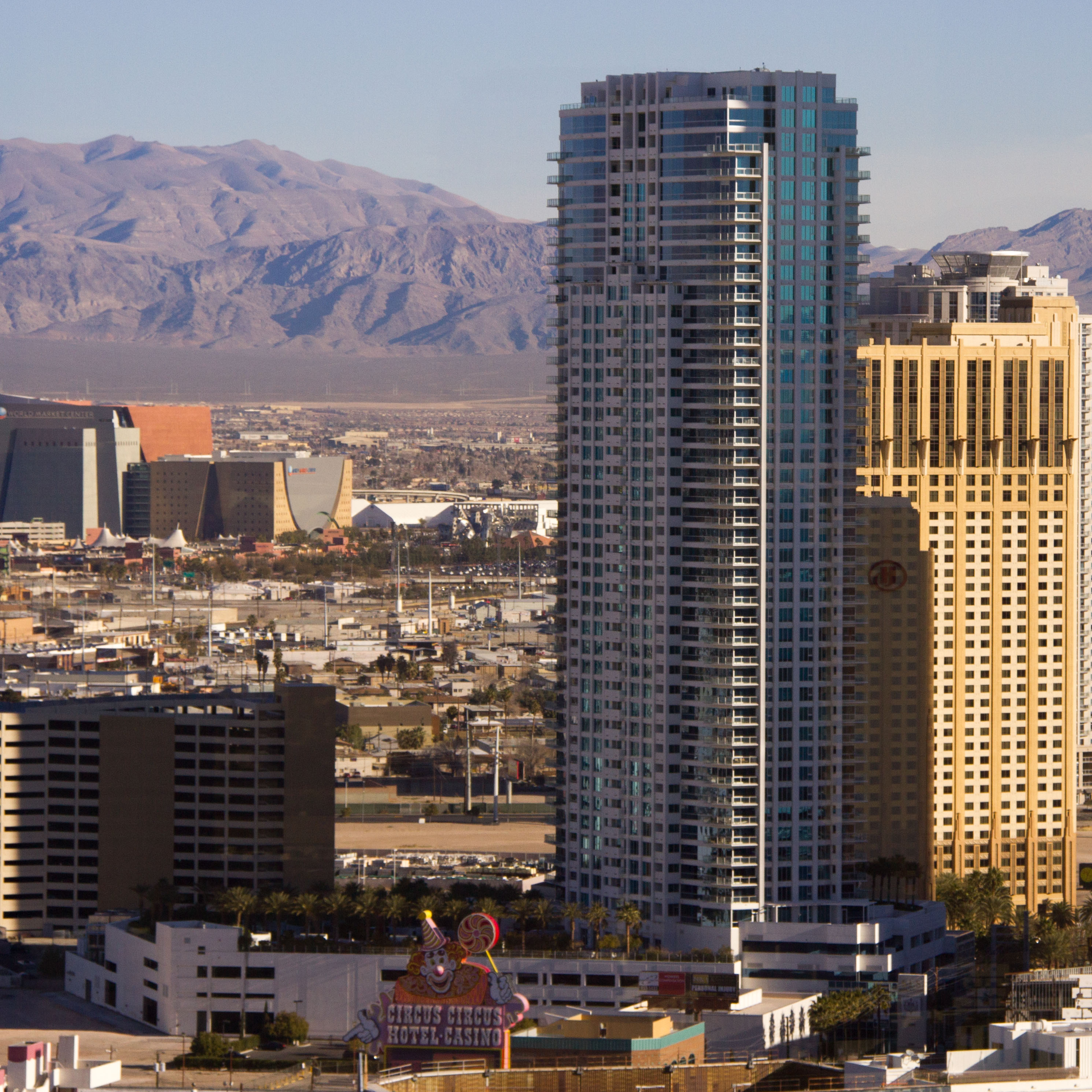

General information
- Status: Completed
- Type: Residential
- Location: Winchester, Nevada, 2700 Las Vegas Boulevard South
- Coordinates: 36°8′19″N 115°9′41″W
- Construction started: 2005
- Topped-out: September 2006
- Completed: 2007
- Opening: May 2007
- Cost: $325 million

Height
- Height: 500 ft (150 m)

Technical details
- Floor count: 45

Design and construction
- Architecture firm: Klai Juba Architects
- Developer: Nevada Development Partners
- Main contractor: M.J. Dean

Other information
- Number of units: 409

Sky Las Vegas is a 45-story luxury high-rise condominium tower with 409 units, situated on a 3-acre site on the Las Vegas Strip in Winchester, Nevada. A two-story retail project had initially been planned for the site in 2001, although it ultimately did not materialize. Plans for Sky Las Vegas were announced in July 2004, with construction beginning the following year and its opening occurring in May 2007.

== History ==
=== Original plans ===
In February 2001, NewMark Merrill – a developer of strip malls in southern California – announced plans to purchase a 3-acre (1.2 ha) property on the Las Vegas Strip. The property, located north of the Circus Circus resort and south of a planned Hilton timeshare high-rise, was owned by Bill Bennett, who also owned the nearby Sahara Hotel and Casino. NewMark Merrill was planning a two-story, 55,000 sq ft (5,100 m^{2}) retail project for the property that would be known as the Boulevard Collection. The project was designed by Lee & Sakahara, and was to be opened in 2004. After the September 11 attacks, Hilton halted construction of its nearby timeshare project, and NewMark subsequently had difficulty securing tenants because of concerns about the lack of new development at the northern end of the Las Vegas Strip.

=== Announcement and construction ===
Nevada Development Partners purchased the vacant 3-acre (1.2 ha) property from NewMark Merrill in March 2004, at a cost of $13.5 million. The company was made up of Aaron Yashouafar, the chief executive of the Los Angeles-based Milbank Real Estate Services Inc.; and David Pourbaba and Neil Kadisha, developers from southern California. In July 2004, plans were announced for Sky Las Vegas, a 40-story, 350-unit condominium tower. Construction was expected to commence in the first quarter of 2005, and was expected to cost $300 million. The project was being designed by Klai Juba Architects.

An advertisement for Sky Las Vegas was published on February 1, 2005, and read, "Dear Tara Reid. Come let it all hang out." The advertisement referred to a wardrobe malfunction that Reid had while posing for photographers at an event the previous year. In March 2005, Reid sued Sky Las Vegas, alleging that the project was benefiting from her malfunction and that the advertisement misrepresented her as "sexually lewd or immoral." Reid wanted publication and distribution of the advertisement to cease. The case was settled later that year.

In early April 2005, it was announced that groundbreaking was scheduled for early May, with completion scheduled for late 2006. The foundation was poured in September 2005. Construction had reached the 19th floor in January 2006, with an additional floor being added approximately every four days. Approximately 85 percent of the project's 409 units had been sold up to that time. NASCAR racer Geoff Bodine, who purchased a unit at Sky Las Vegas, attended a topping out party held for the project in September 2006.

On April 3, 2007, a gas explosion occurred in a swimming-pool pump room on the fourth floor during construction. Three workers were sent to local hospitals, while a fourth worker had his injuries treated at the construction site. No damage was done to the building. M.J. Dean was the general contractor for the project, which cost $325 million. Hypo Real Estate co-financed the project by providing either $216.3 million or $260 million.

=== Opening and operation ===
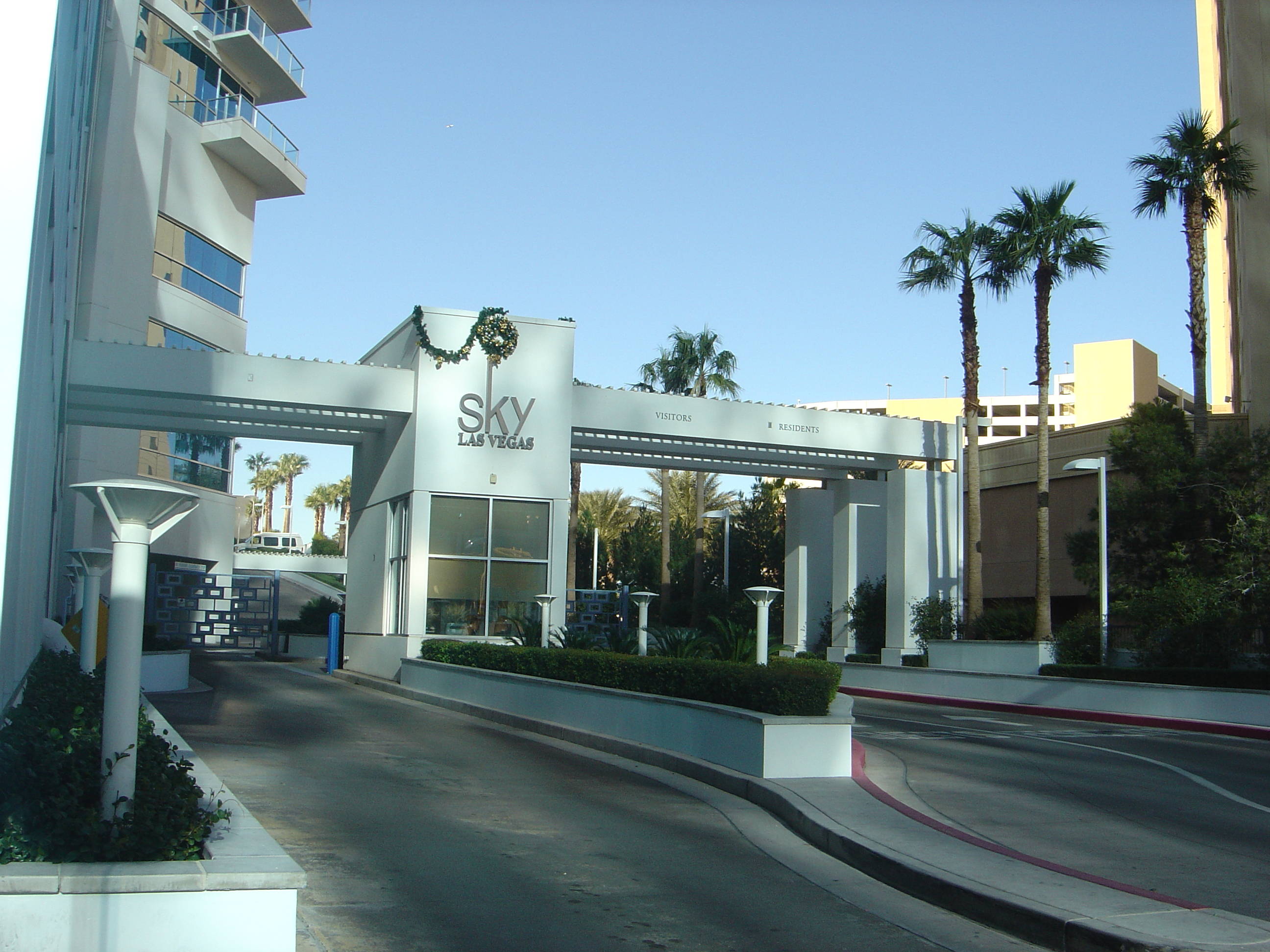
Entrance

Sky Las Vegas opened in May 2007, and was the first high-rise condominium project to open on the Las Vegas Strip. Four three-story residences known as SkySuites – each with four bedrooms and five bathrooms and measuring 5,000 sq ft (460 m^{2}) – occupy the upper three floors, above the penthouses; one was valued at $5.8 million in 2025. In July 2007, an unfinished 2,985 sq ft (277.3 m^{2}) penthouse sold for $2.7 million. Some units were rented out because of difficulty selling them, as a result of the poor economy.

On July 4, 2012, a kitchen fire that was caused by an unattended stove in one of the units forced a brief evacuation of the 32nd and 33rd floors. Southbound lanes on the Las Vegas Strip were also temporarily closed by firefighters. The fire was extinguished after 10 minutes, and with no injuries. On April 25, 2013, a hot tub on the patio of a fifth-floor condominium caught on fire. South Las Vegas Boulevard was briefly closed off to traffic while firefighters contained the fire.

A 14,378 sq ft (1,335.8 m^{2}) CVS Pharmacy store that operates inside the building was sold in March 2014, at a cost of $30 million, the most expensive sale price for a CVS store in the Las Vegas Valley. In April 2015, the tower's remaining unsold 65 units were put on the market as part of a bulk sale that also included 26,800 sq ft (2,490 m^{2}) of vacant retail space on the second and third floors. The sale, with a listed price of "best offer," did not include the CVS store. In September 2015, Pathfinder Partners purchased the tower's remaining 64 units. The CVS was listed for sale in January 2016 and closed in 2017. The retail space remained vacant until its foreclosure in 2025.

== See also ==
- List of tallest buildings in Las Vegas
