= Pioneer Pacific College =

For-profit college in Beaverton, Oregon

- Motto: There's a better life out there for you. We'll help you find it.
- Type: For-profit school
- Established: 1981
- President: Don Moutos
- Academic staff: 119
- Students: 1,287
- Location: Beaverton, Oregon, United States
- Campus: Suburban and Metro
- Satellite campuses: Beaverton, Oregon; Springfield, Oregon
- Website: www.pioneerpacific.edu

Pioneer Pacific College was a private for-profit college with its main campus in Beaverton, Oregon. Founded in 1981, it primarily offered Associate degrees and certificate programs.

== History ==
Pioneer Pacific College began in 1981 as an electronics school in Corvallis, Oregon, named Skilltronics. Founded by Irene and James Childears, the training school was moved to Wilsonville in 1983. Pacific Education Corporation purchased Skilltronics in 1989 and changed the name to Pioneer Pacific College with accreditation coming in 1995. Former Oregon legislator Kelly Clark co-owned the college in the early 1990s.

In 1999, the college added a campus in Clackamas and moved the main campus to a larger facility in 2000. For the 2001 to 2002 academic year, the school granted 108 associate degrees. Pioneer Pacific started a criminal justice program in 2002 that offered an associate degree at its Wilsonville campus. Also in 2002, the school established a campus in Lane County adjacent to the University of Oregon, with the campus relocating the next year to Springfield.

Bachelor's degrees were added in 2004, first with information technology and then others in 2005. In 2004, the college added the Health Career Institute, followed by a culinary arts program in 2006. For the 2005 to 2006 academic year, the school's criminal justice program ranked 41st in the United States for most associate degrees granted in that field. As of 2007, the school had 1,287 students with 250 graduating each year. In 2012, Pioneer Pacific College was granted approval by the American Bar Association to offer the Bachelor of Science Degree in Legal Studies. In 2014, Springfield campus was granted preliminary approval by the Joint Review Committee on Education in Radiologic Technology (JRCert) to offer its Associate of Science Degree in Radiologic Technology program. In 2015, Beaverton learning site was opened and granted approval to begin classes from ACICS.

The college announced plans to close its campuses in Portland, Beaverton, and Springfield, as well as the Oregon Culinary Institute by the end of July 2020. The college already had plans to fire 131 faculty and staff members due to lowered enrollment that it attributed to the COVID-19 pandemic.

== Campuses ==
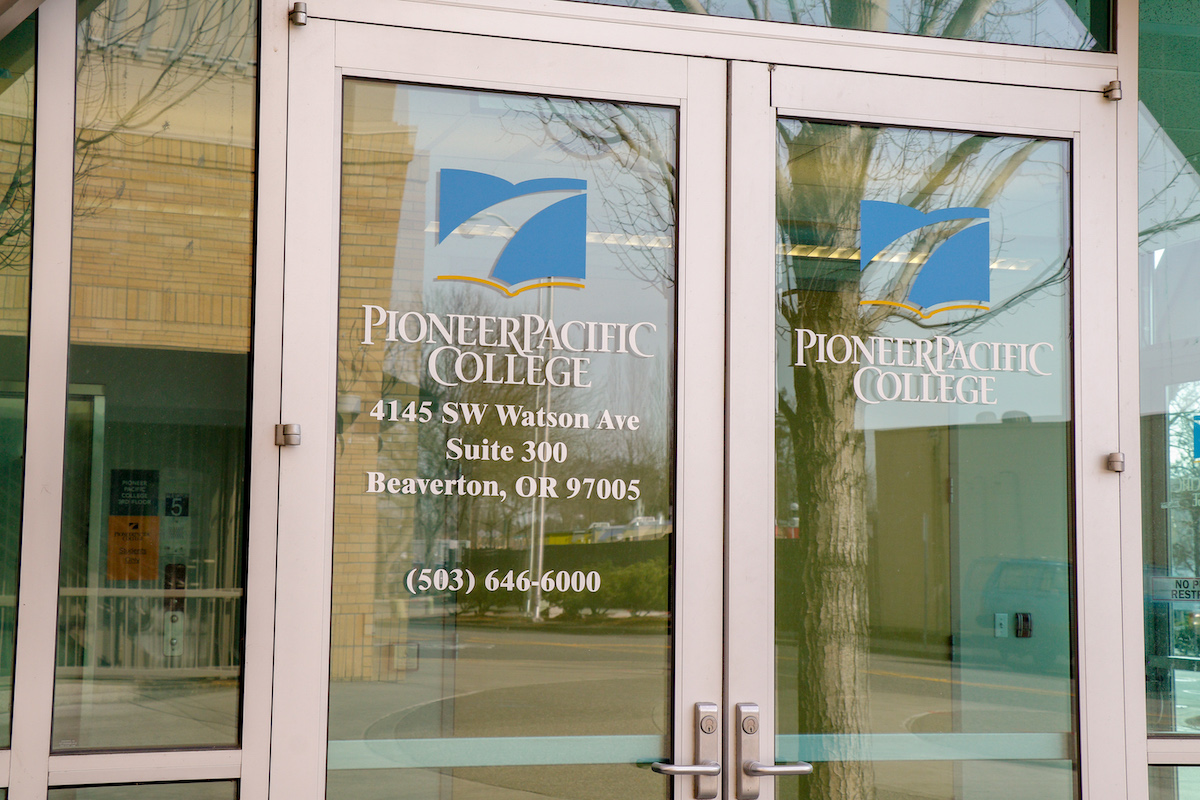
Main campus in Beaverton

Pioneer Pacific College had three campus locations in the Portland Metro and surrounding areas including Beaverton, and Springfield, in addition to a facility for culinary arts in downtown Portland. Pioneer Pacific's main campus was in Beaverton. The Beaverton, OR campus offered courses in legal studies and healthcare. The campus location was opened in August 2015 and granted approval by the ACICS. The Lane County campus was located in Springfield's Gateway District on Sports Way and was housed in a two-story building with 20,000 square feet (1,900 m^{2}) of space. The culinary arts program was taught at the Oregon Culinary Institute in Downtown Portland. The culinary school offered programs in Culinary Management Associate of Applied Science Degree, Culinary Arts, Baking and Pastry Management Associate of Applied Science Degree (AAS), and Baking and Pastry Diploma. Seventy-three percent of students attended full-time and the school employed 119 teachers, of which 41% were full-time faculty members.

== Academics ==
Pioneer Pacific College offered several degree and diploma programs in the healthcare, business, and legal fields. Online/Hybrid Courses were also available through an online platform. The school was accredited by the Accrediting Council for Independent Colleges and Schools since 1995.

== Closure ==
Pioneer Pacific College in Springfield, Beaverton, and Portland, including Oregon Culinary Institute in Portland, closed on approximately July 31, 2020.
