= Eggslut =

Multinational restaurant chain

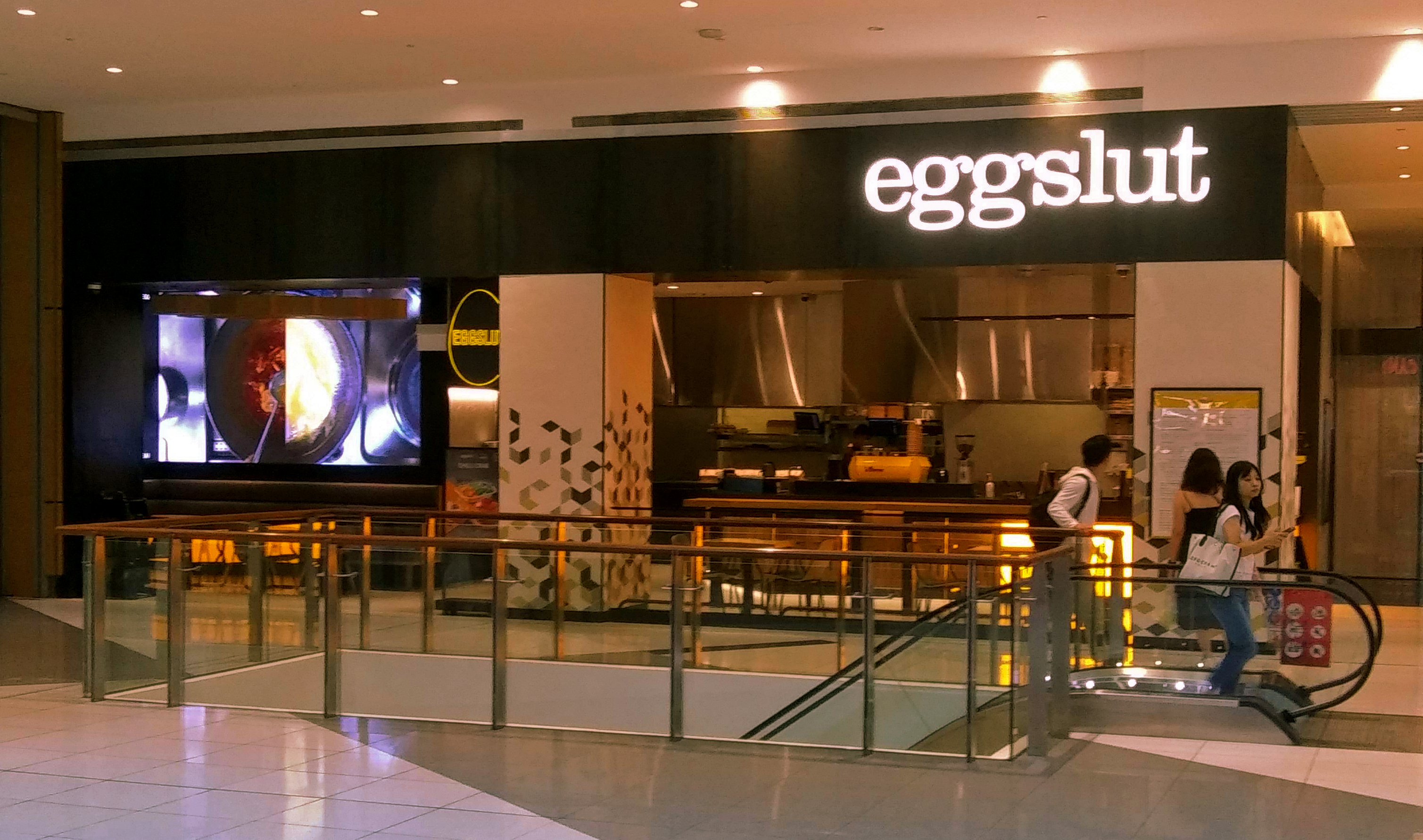
- Eggslut in Singapore

Restaurant information
- Food type: Fast food
- Location: Los Angeles, United States
- Other locations: Las Vegas; Seattle; Tokyo; London; Manchester; Perth; Toronto; Vancouver; Hong Kong (former); Kuwait (former); Singapore (former); Seoul (former)

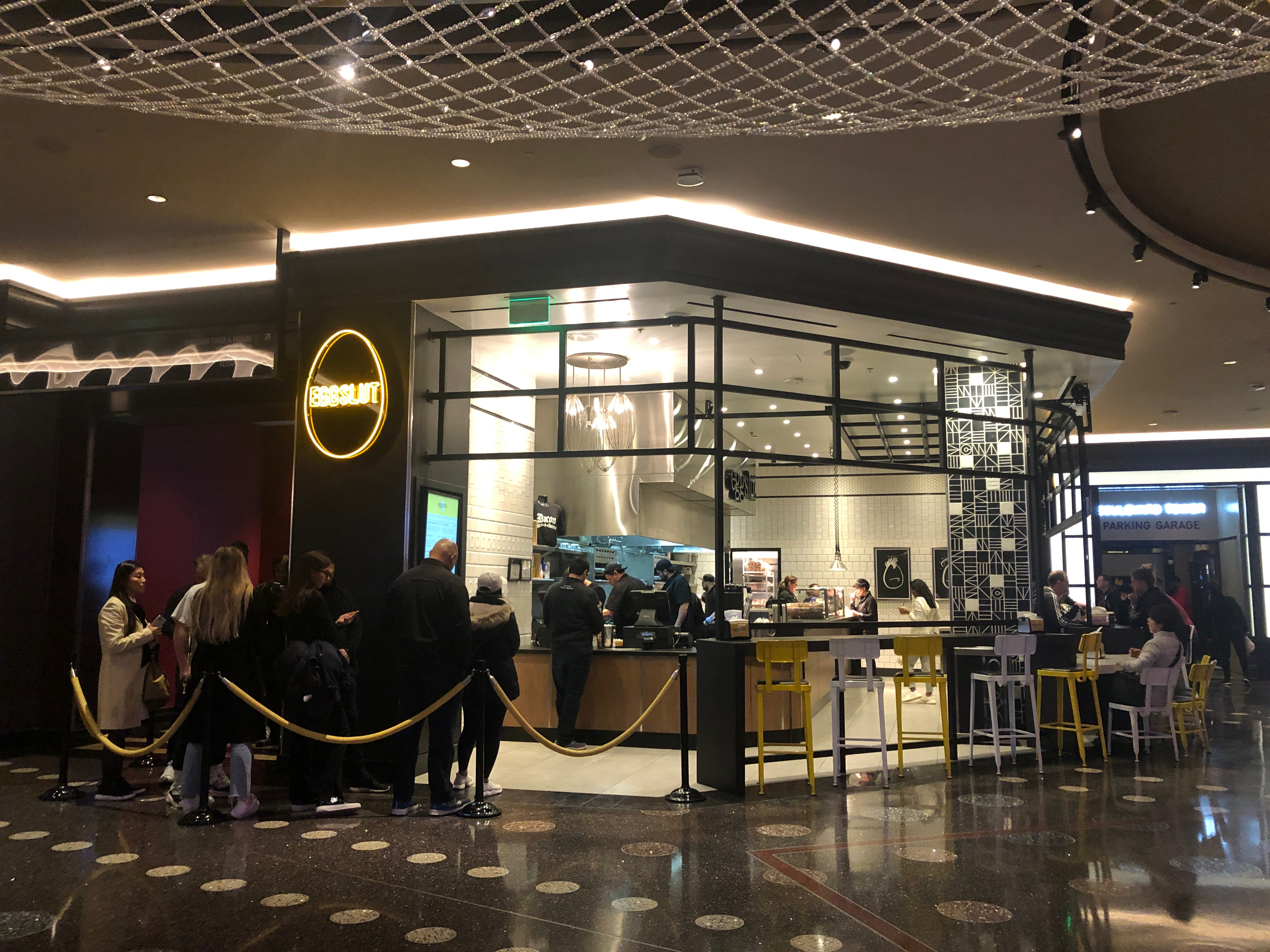
Eggslut at the Cosmopolitan Las Vegas.

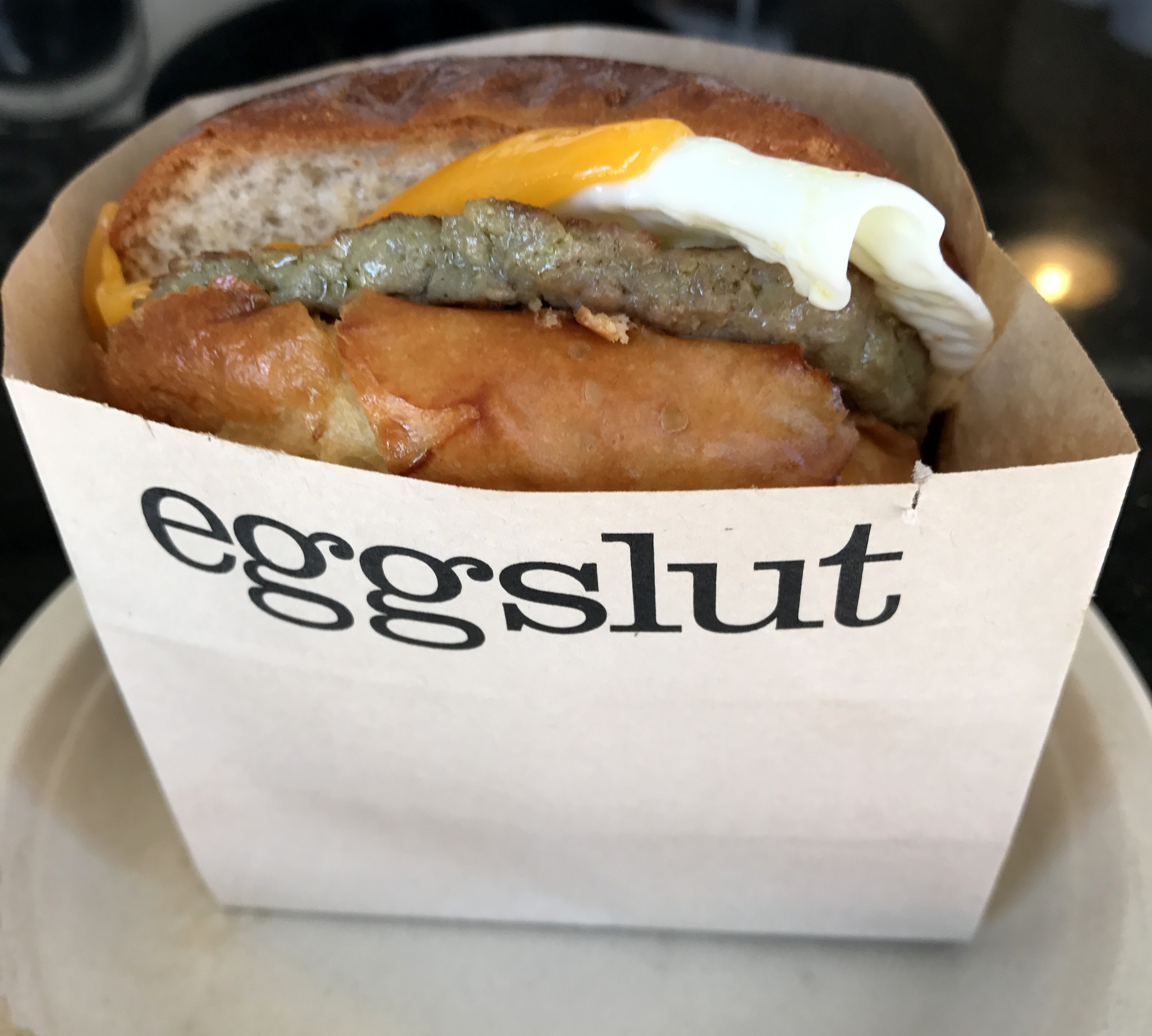
An Eggslut sausage, egg, and cheese sandwich

Eggslut (stylized as eggslut) is a sandwich restaurant chain with locations in the United States, Japan, the United Kingdom, Australia, and Canada. It is known for its egg sandwiches and its signature dish, the Slut, a coddled egg on pureed potatoes. It was founded by Alvin Cailan in 2011.

== History ==
Eggslut's name refers to the popular phrase which developed among foodies in the mid-2000s that describes people who serve every dish topped by an egg.

In 2013, Eggslut opened its first brick-and-mortar location in Los Angeles's Grand Central Market. In March 2017, Eggslut temporarily opened a pop-up concept store at Chefs Club Counter restaurant in Nolita, New York. Eggslut opened its first international store in the UK (7 August 2019), its second in Tokyo, Japan (13 September 2019), and its third international location in Seoul, South Korea (10 July 2020). SPC Group, a South Korean franchisor of Paris Baguette, and master Korean franchisee of Dunkin Donuts, Baskin Robbins, Jamba Juice, and Shake Shack, has the rights to Eggslut in several countries. The brand also opened its first store in Singapore on 9 September 2021 at Scotts Square. In February 2025, the Eggslut store in Hong Kong announced its closure the same month; it had been operating there since 2022. This then followed by the sudden closure of Singapore branch on February 28, 2025.

Eggslut opened a location in Seattle's Melrose Market in 2025.

In February 2026, an Eggslut outlet branded as "Burgers by ES" opened at Crown Perth in Australia. Due to a regulatory briefing in 2018 that deemed the original name to be offensive, the company had to change the name of the outlet to "Burgers by ES".

In April 2026, the first of two planned Toronto locations opened on King Street.

== Reception ==
The restaurant's name has been included in a list of risqué names by KCET and The New York Times, with Eli Altman stating that having a boring name may mean that an advertisement does not attract attention. Samuel Muston wrote that "Eggslut" falls into a category of "quirky" restaurant names, but that "the collision of the word 'egg' and 'slut' doesn't exactly encourage the appetite".

The Grand Central Market in Los Angeles was named as one of the top ten new U.S. restaurants by Bon Appétit for 2014, and Eggslut is mentioned.
