= Going Off the Menu =

- Genre: Reality television
- Starring: Liza deGuia; Russell Jackson
- Country of origin: United States
- Original language: English
- No. of seasons: 2
- No. of episodes: 11

Production
- Executive producers: Frank Matson; Tim McOsker
- Running time: 14 minutes
- Production company: Citizen Pictures

Original release
- Network: Bravotv.com
- Release: April 18, 2016 – 2016

Going Off the Menu is an American series that premiered on Bravotv.com on April 18, 2016. The six-part digital series features underground chef Russell Jackson and food documentarian Liza deGuia as they visit various underground restaurants in Los Angeles to explore the "most surprising underground and exclusive foodie experiences". The second season of the show premiered on May 8, 2017, with chef Graham Elliot joining the show.

The series is the first Bravo show that was released only on digital platforms.

== Episodes ==
| No. | Title | Original release date |
|---|---|---|
| 1 | "Hungry to Hungry" | April 18, 2016 |
| 2 | "Dance for Your Dinner" | April 18, 2016 |
| 3 | "I'll Show You Mine" | April 18, 2016 |
| 4 | "MythBusters' Tory Belleci Goes Up in Smoke" | April 25, 2016 |
| 5 | "Josh Flagg Is at the Top of the Food Chain" | April 25, 2016 |
| 6 | "Put a Spork in It" | April 25, 2016 |
