= Emina Cunmulaj =

Albanian model (born 1984)

Emina Cunmulaj Nazarian
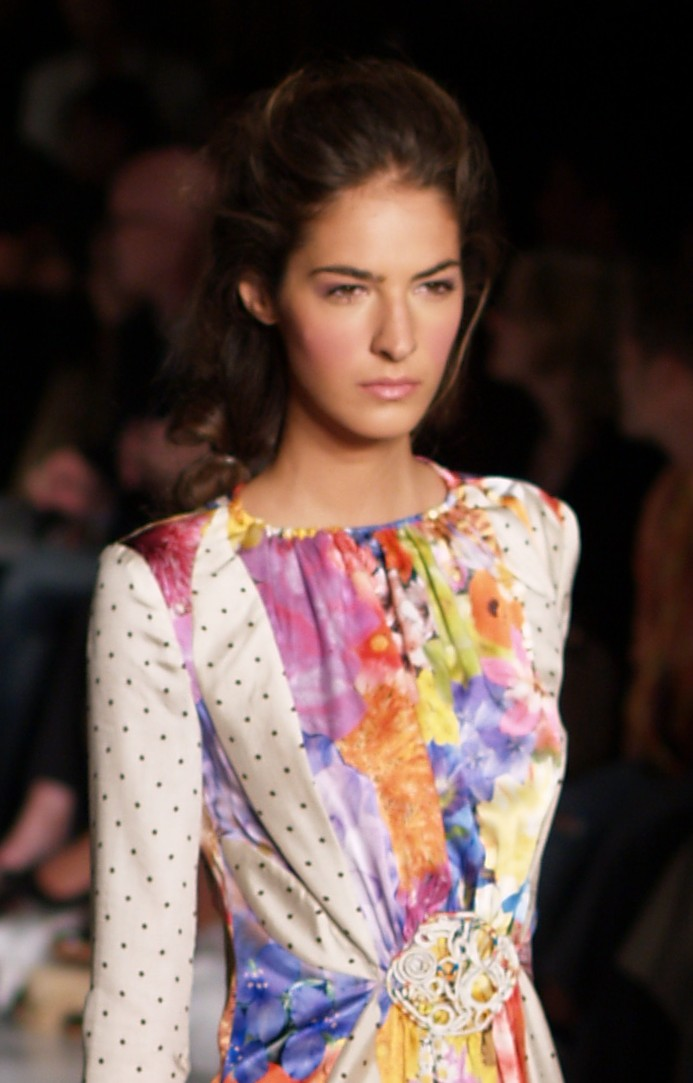
- Cunmulaj modeling in Cynthia Rowley spring/summer 2006 show, New York Fashion Week, September 14, 2006.
- Born: Emina Çunmulaj; September 12, 1984 (age 42); Farmington Hills, Michigan, U.S.
- Spouse: Sam Nazarian
- Children: 3
- Modeling information
- Height: 1.80 m (5 ft 11 in)
- Hair color: dark brown
- Eye color: brown
- Agency: Elite Model Management

Emina Cunmulaj (Albanian pronunciation: [ɛˈmina tʃunˈmulaj]; born September 12, 1984) is an Albanian-American model.

== Early life ==
Cunmulaj was born in Farmington Hills, Michigan, United States, to Albanian parents and was raised in Montenegro.

== Career ==
Cunmulaj began modeling after taking part in the Elite Model Look competition in Yugoslavia in 2001. Models.com lists her professional work across runway shows, advertising, editorials and magazine covers.

During the mid-2000s, Cunmulaj appeared in runway shows for several fashion houses. Vogue Runway credits her as a model in the Spring 2006 ready-to-wear collections for Dolce & Gabbana, Versace, and Hermès. Her Models.com profile also lists work for Jean Paul Gaultier, including Spring/Summer 2011 and Spring/Summer 2012 show credits.

On September 29, 2023, Cunmulaj was a judge for the 72nd Miss USA pageant, held at the Grand Sierra Resort in Reno, Nevada.

== Personal life ==
Cunmulaj is married to businessman Sam Nazarian.

== Nonprofit work ==
Cunmulaj is the founder of Emina's Hand Foundation, a nonprofit organization focused on serving communities, families and women in need. Candid's GuideStar Charity Check lists Eminas Hand Foundation Inc. as a Miami-based 501(c)(3) public charity and identifies its non-private-foundation status as a Section 509(a)(1) organization described in Section 170(b)(1)(A)(vi). The Internal Revenue Service describes Section 509(a)(1) organizations as public charities that receive substantial support from governmental units, the general public or other public charities.

The foundation's publicly available IRS profile provides limited financial detail but indicates they file a 990-N, meaning their gross receipts are normally $50,000 or less. Candid's GuideStar Charity Check lists the organization's most recent IRS Business Master File entry as June 8, 2026, with a foundation code description stating that the organization receives a substantial part of its support from a governmental unit or the general public. At least one-third of their support is from public sources.

== Selected magazine covers ==
Models.com lists Cunmulaj's magazine-cover work, including covers for Elle Argentina and Marie Claire France.
