= Oregon Culinary Institute =

For-profit Culinary school in Portland, Oregon

Coordinates: 45°31′05.0″N 122°41′29.6″W

- Company type: Privately owned, for-profit, accredited trade school
- Industry: Education, Food service
- Founded: 2006
- Founder: Eric Stromquist, Brian Wilke
- Defunct: July 2020
- Fate: Permanently closed due to anticipated decline in enrollment from COVID-19
- Headquarters: Portland, Oregon, United States
- Key people: Eric Stromquist (President, 2006–2015)
- Services: Culinary arts programs, baking and pastry programs, restaurant management programs
- Owner: Pioneer Pacific College (system)
- Parent: Pioneer Pacific College
- Footnotes / references Slogan: "Training Kitchen People". Campus included a student-staffed restaurant.

Oregon Culinary Institute (OCI) was a privately owned, for-profit, accredited trade school located in Portland, Oregon, United States that was part of the Pioneer Pacific College system. It offered programs in culinary arts, baking and pastry, and restaurant management, with a curriculum to prepare graduates for the food-service industry. OCI's campus was located in the Goose Hollow neighborhood of southwest Portland, and included a restaurant staffed by students. Their slogan was "Training Kitchen People".

== History ==
In 2006, Eric Stromquist and Brian Wilke started Oregon Culinary Institute. The school offered a range of programs from diplomas to a range of different degrees. Stromquist remained president through 2015.

In July 2020, Pioneer Pacific College notified the state agencies that it planned to permanently close the downtown Portland OCI location along with other three art campuses in Portland, Beaverton and Springfield. This was in anticipation of a sharp decline in enrollment due to COVID-19.

== Facilities and programs ==
OCI's programs were taught in a 10,000 square foot (930 m^{2}) campus that included lecture classrooms and three computer labs. OCI taught and employed sustainable business practices, including partnering with farmers, ranchers, and fishermen to source local ingredients.

=== Restaurant ===
As an extension of the culinary arts, baking and pastry, and restaurant management classrooms, OCI had an open-to-the-public restaurant able to accommodate up to 50 guests. Students prepared and served all lunches and dinners. The restaurant was open Monday through Friday, offering a three-course lunch and a four-course dinner.
