= Angella Nazarian =

Iranian-American author and philanthropist

- Born: Angella Maddahi; Tehran, Iran
- Education: Ettefagh
- Occupations: Academic, author, philanthropist
- Spouse: David Nazarian
- Children: 2
- Relatives: Younes Nazarian (father-in-law); Sam Nazarian (brother-in-law)
- Website: AngellaNazarian.com

Angella Nazarian is an American former Professor of Psychology at Mount St. Mary's University, California State University, Long Beach and the Los Angeles Valley College, non-fiction author, conference organizer and philanthropist.

== Early life ==
Angella Nazarian was born as Angella Maddahi in Tehran, Iran in the late 1960s, to a Jewish family. Her father was a bazaar trader from Rasht. Her family name was originally Yacobzadeh; he changed it to Maddahi to obviate anti-Semitic discrimination. Moreover, they did not tell other people they were Jewish. She has a sister and three brothers. She was educated at Ettefagh, a Jewish school in Tehran.

During the Iranian Revolution of 1979, she immigrated to the United States with her family, settling in Beverly Hills, California, where her uncle and brothers lived. The next year, her parents went back to Iran to sell their assets, but they were not allowed to leave because of the ongoing Iran–Iraq War. By 1985, they managed to escape to Pakistan, and were sent back to the United States by the Jewish Federations of North America. Both Angella and her parents received political asylum in the United States. They are not allowed to visit Iran again. An interview of her early life as a refugee conducted by JIMENA was published in The Jerusalem Post.

== Career ==
Nazarian was a Professor of Psychology at Mount St. Mary's University, California State University, Long Beach and the Los Angeles Valley College for eleven years.

She is a non-fiction author and has written four books. Her first book, Life as a Visitor, chronicled her departure from Iran and life as a refugee in California. Her second book, Pioneers of the Possible: Celebrating Visionary Women of the World, was a collection of essays about female role models. Her third book, Visionary Women, highlights the lives of twenty female luminaries of modern times. In her fourth book "Creative Couples: Collaborations that Changed History", Nazarian explores the various forms a couple can take and dives deep into the stories of fifteen couples who motivate one another, work together, and change lives as a team.

Nazarian was a speaker at the 2012 Milken Institute Global Conference. In 2013, she organized a conference on women's rights called Women A.R.E.. Speakers included Wallis Annenberg and Sharon Stone.

== Philanthropy ==
Angella co-founded Looking Beyond, a non-profit organization that promotes awareness and enriches the lives of children and young adults with special needs.

In 2015, Angella co-founded the non-profit women’s leadership organization, Visionary Women, along with her co-founders, former mayor of Beverly Hills and City Council member, Honorable Lili Bosse, and former US Ambassador, Nicole Avant, and Veronica Smiley, bringing together some of the most dynamic thought leaders in the country for in-depth conversations. She now serves as the organization’s president. Speakers include 2011 Nobel Peace Laureate Leymah Gbowee, President of Conde Nast Entertainment, Dawn Ostroff, Vice President of Original Content at Netflix, Pauline Fischer, and five-time Emmy Winning journalist Giselle Fernandez.

With her husband, she has endowed the David and Angella Nazarian Youth Program at Sinai Temple, a Conservative synagogue in Westwood, for children from the 9th to the 12th grade. In 2014, they were also honored for their Jewish and pro-Israel philanthropy by Hillel 818, the chapter of Hillel: The Foundation for Jewish Campus Life for students at California State University, Northridge (CSUN), Pierce College and the Los Angeles Valley College. Additionally, they endowed the Angella and David Nazarian Social Innovators in Residence program at the Wharton School of the University of Pennsylvania.

She is a member of the Iranian American Women Foundation and has spoken at conferences on their behalf.

== Awards ==
Nazarian was awarded an honorary Doctorate Degree in Letters and Science from Woodbury University in 2017. She is also the recipient of the Ellis Island Medal of Honor, which is presented annually to American citizens whose accomplishments in their field and inspired service to the United States are cause for celebration.

In October 2020, Angeleno Magazine honored Nazarian on their list of "The 25 Most Influential Angelenos".

In 2018, CSQ honored Nazarian in the "Visionaries Awards in Philanthropy, Art, & Culture".

In 2017, LA Confidential listed Nazarian as a "Woman of Influence" in their women’s issue.

In 2015, the Los Angeles Lakers and Comerica Bank presented Ms. Nazarian with the Women’s Leadership Award in the category of Women of Diversity.

== Personal life ==
She is married to David Nazarian, an investor, philanthropist and son of business mogul and philanthropist Younes Nazarian. They have two sons.

== Bibliography ==
- Life as a Visitor (Assouline, 2009).
- Pioneers of the Possible: Celebrating Visionary Women of the World (Assouline, 2012).
- Visionary Women (Assouline, 2015)
- Creative Couples: Collaborations that Changed History (Assouline, 2019)
