= Sam Nazarian =

American businessman (born 1975)

- سام نظریان
- Born: 1975 (age 50–51); Tehran, Imperial State of Iran
- Education: University of Southern California
- Occupations: Founder & CEO of SBE Entertainment Group
- Spouse: Emina Cunmulaj
- Parent: Younes Nazarian
- Relatives: Izak Parviz Nazarian (uncle); David Nazarian (brother); Angella Nazarian (sister-in-law); Shulamit Nazarian (sister)
- Website: SBE.com

Sam Nazarian (Persian: سام نظریان; born 1975) is an Iranian American businessman, investor, and philanthropist. He is the founder, chairman, and CEO of SBE Entertainment Group, a lifestyle hospitality company that develops, manages, and operates hotels, restaurants, and nightclubs globally.

In 2023, Nazarian expanded his ventures by launching HQ Hotels & Residences, a hospitality brand in alliance with Wyndham Hotels & Resorts. In 2024, Nazarian worked with Tony Robbins to open a hotel brand called The Estate.

== Early life and education ==
Nazarian was born in 1975 into a Persian Jewish family in Tehran, Iran. He is the son of Younes Nazarian, an entrepreneur who built a construction empire in Iran before fleeing to the United States following the Islamic Revolution of 1979. They settled in Beverly Hills, California. Younes co-founded Omninet and became a major shareholder of Qualcomm.

Sam Nazarian attended Beverly Hills High School, graduating in 1993, and later studied at the University of Southern California. After donating $200,000 to the Beverly Hills Athletic Alumni Association, the Beverly Hills High School basketball court was renamed Sam Nazarian Court.

== Business career ==
=== SBE Entertainment Group ===
In 2002, he founded SBE Entertainment Group, focusing on hospitality ventures.

Under Nazarian's leadership, SBE expanded to include brands such as SLS Hotels, Hyde Lounge, and Katsuya. Katsuya is a partnership with master sushi chef Katsuya Uechi and French designer Philippe Starck, which has an initial location in Los Angeles and expanded into locations in Bahamas, Bahrain, Kuwait, Qatar, and United Arab Emirates.

In 2020, he sold the remaining 50% stake of SBE's hotel platform to Accor Hotels but retained its food and beverage operations.

In December 2014, the Nevada Gaming Control Board conducted a background check on Nazarian to get a Las Vegas gaming license for the SLS Las Vegas hotel. The report resulted in a conditional one-year gaming license and led to SLS Las Vegas being sold to Stockbridge Capital in 2015. In 2015, Nazarian was in a lawsuit over the SLS South Beach hotel in Miami which was heading towards a trial in 2017.

In May 2016, Nazarian acquired Morgans Hotel Group for $805 million and took ownership of Delano Hotel in South Beach, Hudson Hotel in New York City and Clift Hotel in San Francisco.

In July 2018 and November 2020, Nazarian sold 50% of his SBE hotel brands to French hotel group Accor for $125 million and then the remaining 50% for $850 million dollars.

In 2023, Nazarian re-entered the hotel industry by launching HQ Hotels & Residences through an alliance with Wyndham Hotels & Resorts. This initiative focuses on hospitality experiences through dining, nightlife, and wellness.

The first HQ Hotels & Residences locations are planned in Montreux, Switzerland, and Detroit, Michigan. The Montreux property, The HQ Montreux Hotel & Spa, will feature 155 rooms and 42 residences. The Detroit property, HQ Detroit Hotel & Spa, will offer 174 guestrooms.

=== The Estate ===
In 2024, Nazarian worked with Tony Robbins to open a hotel brand called The Estate. The Estate is focused on longevity science and offers health diagnostics, wellness coaching, and advanced blood analysis among other services.

The hotel is partnered with Robbins' diagnostic firm Fountain Life which does luxury medical testing. The hotel will open in 13 locations across the U.S. with the first location opening in Los Angeles.

== Personal life ==
Nazarian is married to American model Emina Cunmulaj. The couple has been involved in philanthropic efforts.

== Film career ==
Nazarian has been involved in film production as an executive producer. His credits include the films Waiting..., Down in the Valley, Five Fingers, The Last Time, Mr. Brooks, and College.

== Board memberships and recognitions ==
From 2008 to 2011, Nazarian served on the board of trustees of the Southern California Institute of Architecture. In July 2009, Los Angeles Mayor Antonio Villaraigosa appointed him to the Board of Airport Commissioners of Los Angeles World Airports.

In 2014, Nazarian was named to Fortune's 40 Under 40 list and he was the 2014 Make-A-Wish Foundation Man of the Year.
