= Izak Parviz Nazarian =

American businessman

- اسحاق پرویز نظریان
- Born: February 24, 1929; Tehran, Iran
- Died: August 23, 2017 (aged 88); Los Angeles, California, United States
- Occupations: Managing Partner of Omninet Capital, early investor in Qualcomm
- Spouse: Pouran Nazarian
- Children: Benjamin Nazarian; Dora Nazarian; Dalia Nazarian; Daphna Nazarian
- Relatives: Younes Nazarian (brother); Sam Nazarian (nephew)
- Website: Omninet.com

Izak Parviz Nazarian (Persian: اسحاق پرویز نظریان Is'ḥaq Parvêz Nazariyân; February 24, 1929 – August 23, 2017) was an Iranian-born American billionaire, businessman, investor, real-estate developer, and philanthropist. He was the managing partner of Omninet Capital, an investment vehicle and the first major investor in Qualcomm.

== Early life ==
Nazarian was born to a Persian-Jewish family in 1929 in Tehran, Iran. His father died when he was five years old. His mother opened a sewing shop. He has a brother, Younes Nazarian. He grew up in Tehran, where he was educated at the Alliance Israelite Universal Elementary School and the Technical High School. In 1943, in the midst of World War II, he worked as a waiter's assistant on a United States Army base in Iran.

At the age of eighteen, Nazarian moved to Italy, where he became a member of the Haganah in Genoa in 1947. On 17 May 1948, three days after Israel had become an independent nation, he moved to Israel, where he served in the 1948 Arab–Israeli War as a member of the 7th Armored Brigade. He was wounded in a mining explosion and stayed in hospital for five months. Unable to fight, he resumed his service in the Israel Defense Forces and became Israeli Foreign Minister Golda Meir's chauffeur.

== Career ==
Nazarian started a gravel transportation business shortly after his service with the IDF. He acquired trucks and hired drivers to move gravel to construction sites in Israel. He also owned a cement factory in Yarka. He returned to Iran in 1957, where he expanded his construction business and oversaw the construction of many government buildings. He enjoyed close ties with the Shah, Mohammad Reza Pahlavi.

During the Iranian Revolution of 1979, his name was on the kill list. He went into exile in the United States, settling in Los Angeles. By 1985, he co-founded Omninet with Irwin M. Jacobs and Andrew Viterbi, initially to track the flow of trucks from one construction site to another. The start-up, which merged with Qualcomm, became one of the world's largest chipmakers. As Nazarian was a major shareholder, he became a billionaire.

Nazarian served as a managing partner of Omninet Capital, "a diversified investment firm in the fields of private equity, real estate and venture capital", and managing partner of Omninet Ventures. He was also the chair of Stadco, "a leading producer of high-precision tooling and parts for the aerospace industry."

== Philanthropy ==
Prior to 1979, Nazarian was an advocate of women's rights in Iran. Once in the United States, he worked with Armand Hammer to help Soviet Jews emigrate to Israel in the 1980s. He is a co-founder of the Iranian American Jewish Federation, headquartered in Los Angeles.

Nazarian was the founder of the Magbit Foundation, a non-profit organization which gives scholarships to university students in Israel. He has made charitable contributions to Tel Aviv University (where he endowed the Chair for Modern Iranian Studies), Ben-Gurion University, Technion – Israel Institute of Technology and the Weizmann Institute of Science. He was the recipient of an Honorary Doctorate from Tel Aviv University, where The Pouran and Izak Parviz Nazarian Building is named in honor of Nazarian and his wife. Moreover, he was recognized as one of four "philanthropic visionaries" alongside Guilford Glazer, Jona Goldrich and Max Webb by the American Friends of Tel Aviv University at the Beverly Wilshire Hotel in 2013.

In 2003, Nazarian founded the Citizens Empowerment Center in Israel (CECI), a non-partisan organization which promotes election reform in Israel. In 2009, he published an opinion piece entitled 'Israel must address flawed electoral system' in the Jewish Telegraphic Agency.

== Personal life and death ==
Nazarian and his wife, Pouran, had a son and three daughters, and they resided in Beverly Hills, California. His brother Younes Nazarian was a businessman and philanthropist, an early investor in Qualcomm, and Chairman of Nazarian Enterprises.

Nazarian died on August 23, 2017, in Los Angeles, California.
