= Shulamit Nazarian =

Contemporary art gallery in Los Angeles, California

Coordinates: 34.082453°N 118.343696°W

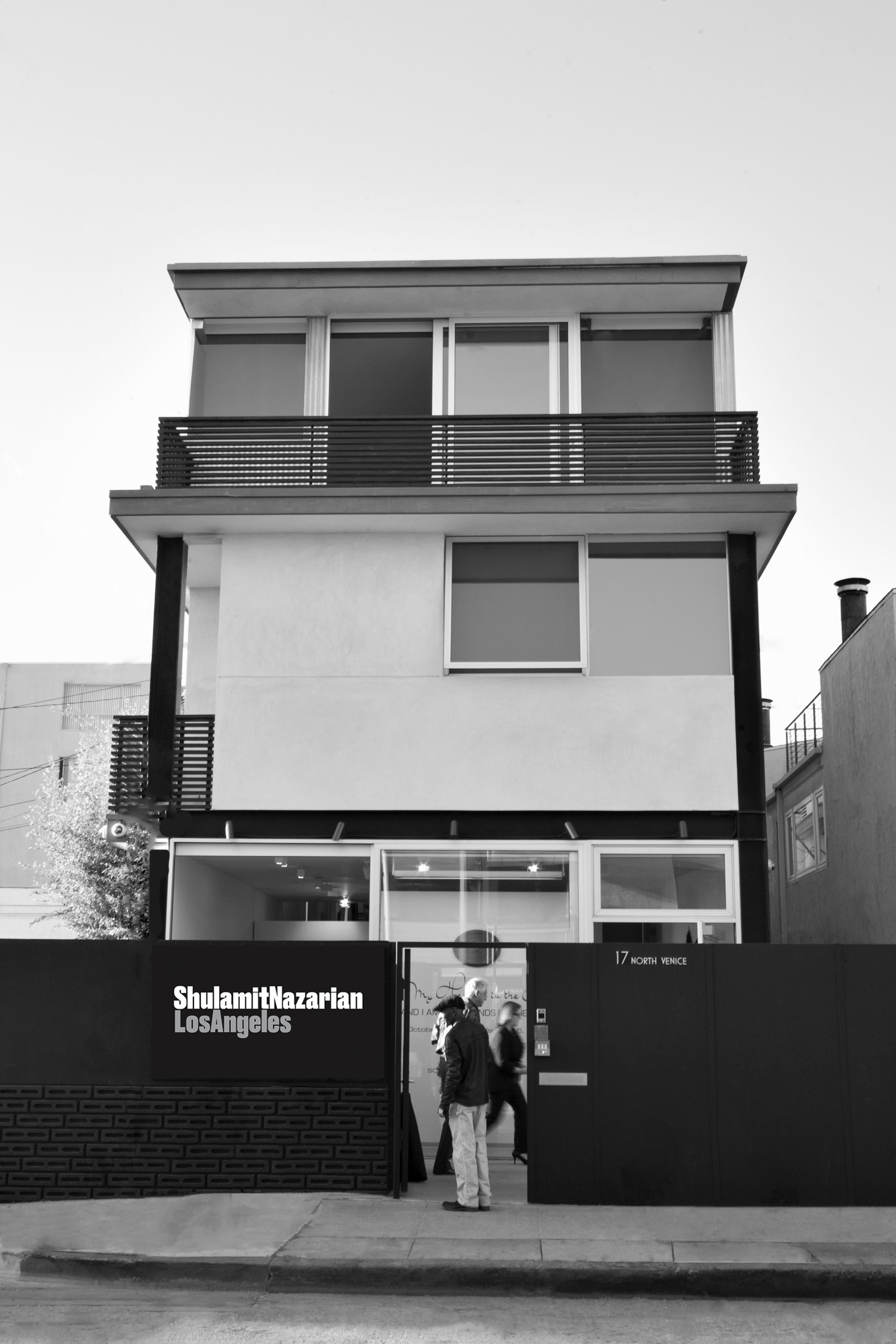
Shulamit Nazarian in Los Angeles, California.

Shulamit Nazarian is a contemporary art gallery located in Los Angeles, California.

== History ==
Shulamit Nazarian began as a roving art platform in 2006 and opened a permanent exhibition space in Venice Beach in 2012. After four years in Venice, the gallery relocated to Hollywood in March 2017. Now located at 616 North La Brea Avenue, just south of Melrose Avenue, the 4,000 square foot building, with original bow-truss ceiling and natural light, is used for exhibitions and large-scale artist projects.

== Artists represented ==
- Theodore Boyer
- Amir H. Fallah
- Genevieve Gaignard
- Wendell Gladstone
- Elham Rokni
