= Shapell =

Shapell may refer to:

== People ==
- David Shapell (1921-2015), Polish-born American Holocaust survivor, real estate developer and philanthropist from Los Angeles, California.
- Nathan Shapell (1922–2007), Polish-born American Holocaust survivor, real estate developer and philanthropist from Los Angeles, California.
- Vera Guerin, née Vera Shapell, American billionaire heiress and musical theatre producer.

== Other ==
- Shapell Industries, one of the largest real estate development companies in Southern California.
- Shapell Manuscript Foundation (SMF), non-profit independent educational organization dedicated to research and the collection of historical documents and original manuscripts.
