= El Dorado Park Estates, Long Beach, California =

El Dorado Park Estates
- Neighborhood of Long Beach
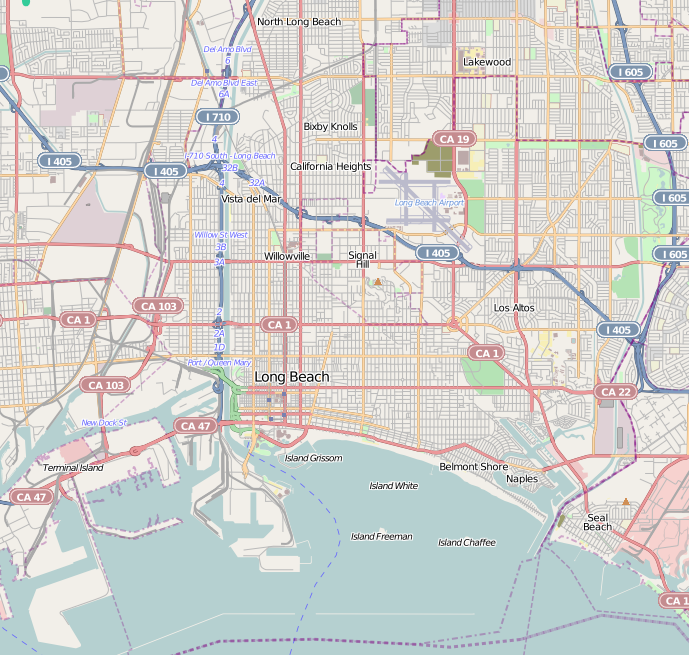
- Location within Long Beach, California Location within the Los Angeles metropolitan area Location within southern California Location within California Location within the United States
- Coordinates: 33°49′02″N 118°04′36″W
- Country: United States
- State: California
- County: Los Angeles
- City: Long Beach
- Website: http://www.eldoestatesassociation.com/

El Dorado Park Estates is a neighborhood in Long Beach, California.

It was developed by S&S Construction, later known as Shapell Industries, beginning in 1962. The company was co-founded by David Shapell, Nathan Shapell, and Max Webb in 1955. It was the first large neighborhood to be developed by the company. In 1966, prices ranged from $33,600 to $46,500. Original features of the homes include:

- lath and plaster ceilings and walls
- exterior ornamentation of Palos Verdes stone (Altamira Shale) or brick
- fireplaces surfaced with used brick, black marble, Bouquet Canyon stone, or Palos Verdes stone
- marble-topped pullman lavatories
- underground utilities

Douglas A. Newcomb Academy opened to 300 students in September, 1963.

== Appearances in media ==
El Dorado Park Estates appears in the 1967 romantic comedy Luv (film).

== See also ==
- Neighborhoods of Long Beach, California
- El Dorado Regional Park, Long Beach, California
