= Kamnitzer =

Kamnitzer is a surname. Notable people with the surname include:

- Bernhard Kamnitzer (1890–1959), German jurist and politician
- Ernst Kamnitzer (1885-1946), German dramatist and publisher
- Heinz Kamnitzer (1917–2001), German writer and historian
- Peter Kamnitzer (1921–1998), German-born American architect
