= Ivy Zelman =

American financial analyst

- Born: May 12, 1966 (age 60); Long Island, NY, United States
- Education: George Mason University (BS)
- Occupations: Financial analyst and businesswoman
- Known for: Housing analyst, American businesswoman, market analyst of subprime mortgage crisis
- Spouse: David Zelman
- Children: 3

Ivy Zelman (born May 12, 1966) is an American financial analyst and businesswoman. She is the co-founder and Executive Vice President of Zelman, a Walker & Dunlop Company, a housing research and advisory firm. Business and finance media noted her early analysis of U.S. housing market conditions in the mid-2000s, including research that raised concerns about speculative activity prior to the subprime mortgage crisis. Michael Lewis referenced her work in The Big Short, writing that “all roads led to Ivy.”

Zelman's commentary on housing market conditions was cited by publications such as Barron's, Fortune, Business Insider, The Wall Street Journal, and The New York Times. She was named on Barron's 100 Most Influential Women in U.S. Finance list and on Forbes 50 Over 50 list.

== Early life and education ==
Zelman was born on Long Island, N.Y., on May 12, 1966. She was raised in a middle-class household; her father worked in international banking and her mother was a homemaker. Zelman has described her father as an early influence on her interest in business. She completed high school in 1984.

After high school, Zelman began her college studies at Baruch College, attending night classes before transferring to Northern Virginia Community College in 1985. She later enrolled at George Mason University, where she earned a Bachelor of Science degree in accounting in 1990.

== Career ==
=== Early career ===
While attending George Mason, Zelman worked at Arthur Young, now known as Ernst & Young. She later joined Salomon Brothers as an analyst in its two-year financial analyst program, focusing on homebuilding and building products. Zelman subsequently joined Credit Suisse, working as a managing director and analyst covering homebuilders. During her time at Credit Suisse, she published research expressing concerns about speculative activity in the housing market, leading to her analysis of the housing bubble crash.

=== Zelman & Associates ===
In the summer of 2007, Zelman left Credit Suisse and co-founded Zelman & Associates with former colleague Dennis McGill. The firm provides research and analysis for institutional investors and business leaders across the housing sector, incorporating proprietary surveys and data from executives at housing-related companies.

Financial publications described the firm’s research approach as detailed and often distinct from broader industry consensus. Barron's referred to Zelman & Associates as “one of the most influential research firms in the country.” Zelman appeared in media interviews discussing housing market conditions, including segments on CNBC, during which Mad Money host Jim Cramer called Zelman "the ax of the homebuilders" on the show.

=== Zelman, A Walker & Dunlop Company ===
In 2021, commercial real estate financial firm Walker & Dunlop acquired Zelman & Associates, integrating the firm’s equity research, investment banking, and advisory operations. The company then operated under the name Zelman. Zelman remained with the business as Executive Vice President, continuing to oversee research relating to the housing ecosystem.

== Analysis of the U.S. housing market ==
In 2005, while at Credit Suisse, Zelman published a report titled Investors Gone Wild, which raised concerns about speculative activity within the homebuilding sector. Her views at the time differed from more optimistic industry perspectives, leading to the industry nickname, "Poison Ivy." During a 2006 Toll Brothers earnings call, Zelman questioned then-CEO Robert Toll's optimistic outlook on market stability, asking him "what Kool-Aid" was he drinking. The housing market subsequently declined in 2008.

Zelman continued to assess housing trends and gave an analysis of the bottom of the housing market occurring in 2012.

== Board affiliations ==
Zelman served on the board of directors for Comstock Holdings Companies Inc. from 2021 to 2024. From 2025 she served on the board of directors of Cardinal Infrastructure Group.

== Achievements and recognition ==
Zelman was included on Forbes 50 over 50: Investment list in 2025. She appeared on Barron's 100 Most Influential Women in U.S. Finance list beginning in 2020, and was included for four consecutive years.

Her commentary on housing and mortgage trends has been featured in outlets such as CNBC, Bloomberg, The Wall Street Journal, and The New York Times.

== Other ventures ==
In 2021, Zelman published a memoir titled Gimme Shelter: Hard Calls + Soft Skills From a Wall Street Trailblazer, which discusses her early life, career, and experiences in the housing industry.

== Philanthropy ==
In 2022, Ivy and David Zelman established the David and Ivy Zelman Family Foundation, which provides grants to community initiatives, education networks, and human services.

Zelman has participated in community and educational programs, including advisory roles with the Laurel School, BBYO, and Jewish Women in Action Cleveland. She has also served as an adjunct professor at Case Western Reserve University at the Weatherhead School of Management.

== Personal life ==
Zelman married to David Zelman in 1998. They have three children.

== Selected publications ==
=== Books ===
- Gimme Shelter: Hard Calls + Soft Skills From a Wall Street Trailblazer. (2021, Aspen Gray Publishing). ISBN 978-1-7377099-2-3

=== Notable market research ===
- Investors Gone Wild (July 2005)
- Wonder-Land (October 2006)
- Cradle to Grave (August 2021)
