= Say Yes to Education =

American urban non-profit organization

- Formation: 1987
- Dissolved: July 30, 2021; 5 years ago
- Type: NGO/Charity
- Purpose: Improving inner-city education
- Headquarters: Hartford, Connecticut
- Founder: George A. Weiss

Say Yes to Education, Inc. (Say Yes) was a U.S. non-profit organization which sought to improve inner-city education. The main focus of Say Yes was to increase high school and college graduation rates by offering a range of support services to at-risk, economically disadvantaged youths and families, and by pledging full scholarships for a college or vocational education to children living in poverty.

Say Yes was organized around local chapters and operates in the northeastern U.S. The organization also partners with other groups to provide services to disadvantaged students and their families.

== History ==
Businessman and philanthropist George A. Weiss founded Say Yes to Education, Inc. in 1987, initially making a promise to 112 sixth graders at Belmont Elementary School in Philadelphia that he would cover the expenses of their college tuition if they graduated from high school. According to David Callahan, Weiss was "directly inspired by Eugene Lang, a philanthropist who made a similar promise to sixth-graders in Harlem, New York in 1981 and then set up the 'I Have a Dream' Foundation to spread this promise to more students."

The first Say Yes cohort produced mixed results, which led Weiss to expand the model beyond tuition support. Later accounts described the program as having improved outcomes outside the original group, and said Weiss concluded that Say yes should begin working with children earlier, before the upper elementary grades.

The organization ceased operations in July 2021.

== Chapters ==
=== Philadelphia, PA ===
Say Yes began in 1987 with the creation of the Belmont Program of the Philadelphia Chapter. The first students chosen to participate in the program were a group of 112 sixth grade students. Students in the Belmont Program received mentoring and tutoring services, and were provided with after-school and summer programs. Say Yes also focused on family outreach, offering social work and psychological services and administering free medical and dental care.

In 1990, the Jane and Robert Toll Program of the Philadelphia Chapter was formed. The program, sponsored by Toll Brothers' Chief Executive Officer Robert I. Toll and his wife, targeted 57 third graders at the Harrity Elementary School in West Philadelphia.

=== Hartford, CT ===
In October 1990, the Hartford Chapter of Say Yes began when 76 fifth grade students at Annie Fisher Elementary School received a "promise of assistance with tuition costs at either the University of Hartford or other accredited post-secondary institutions." This gift from Hartford University was linked with what is now known as the Hartford Scholars Program, which provides Hartford Public School graduates with half-tuition at the university. The goals of the Hartford Chapter were to encourage and motivate at-risk students to graduate from high school and pursue post-secondary education or training; to help students learn how to make constructive decisions for their lives; and to help students become responsible, productive adults. The chapter provided a number of support programs to help students reach these goals, including after-school tutoring, individual student support services, educational summer opportunities, and recognition of student achievement; organizing overnight retreats focusing on growth and development issues such as human sexuality, respect and responsibility within relationships, and conflict resolution; monitoring the academic and personal progress of students; arranging college visits; and providing assistance to families and students with the admission process. The Hartford Chapter of Say Yes closed in June 2005.

=== Cambridge, MA ===
The third Say Yes chapter was formed in June 1991 at the Harrington Elementary School in Cambridge, Massachusetts. The original Say Yes group for the Cambridge Chapter consisted of 69 students who were beginning third grade at Harrington. The chapter was supported by a partnership between Lesley University and the Cambridge Public School District, and with funding from eight local sponsors. Lesley University provided various resources such as tutoring, counseling, academic materials, and professional development help to Harrington. The Cambridge Chapter assisted the school in its restructuring efforts by "working closely with the Harrington administration and faculty to develop strategies for team teaching and grade level cluster development, interdisciplinary and thematic teaching, career weeks, portfolio assessment, and before- and after-school programs."

=== New York, NY ===
The New York City Harlem Program was launched in 2004 through a $50 million initiative in five elementary schools: P.S. 57, 83, 161, 180, and 182.

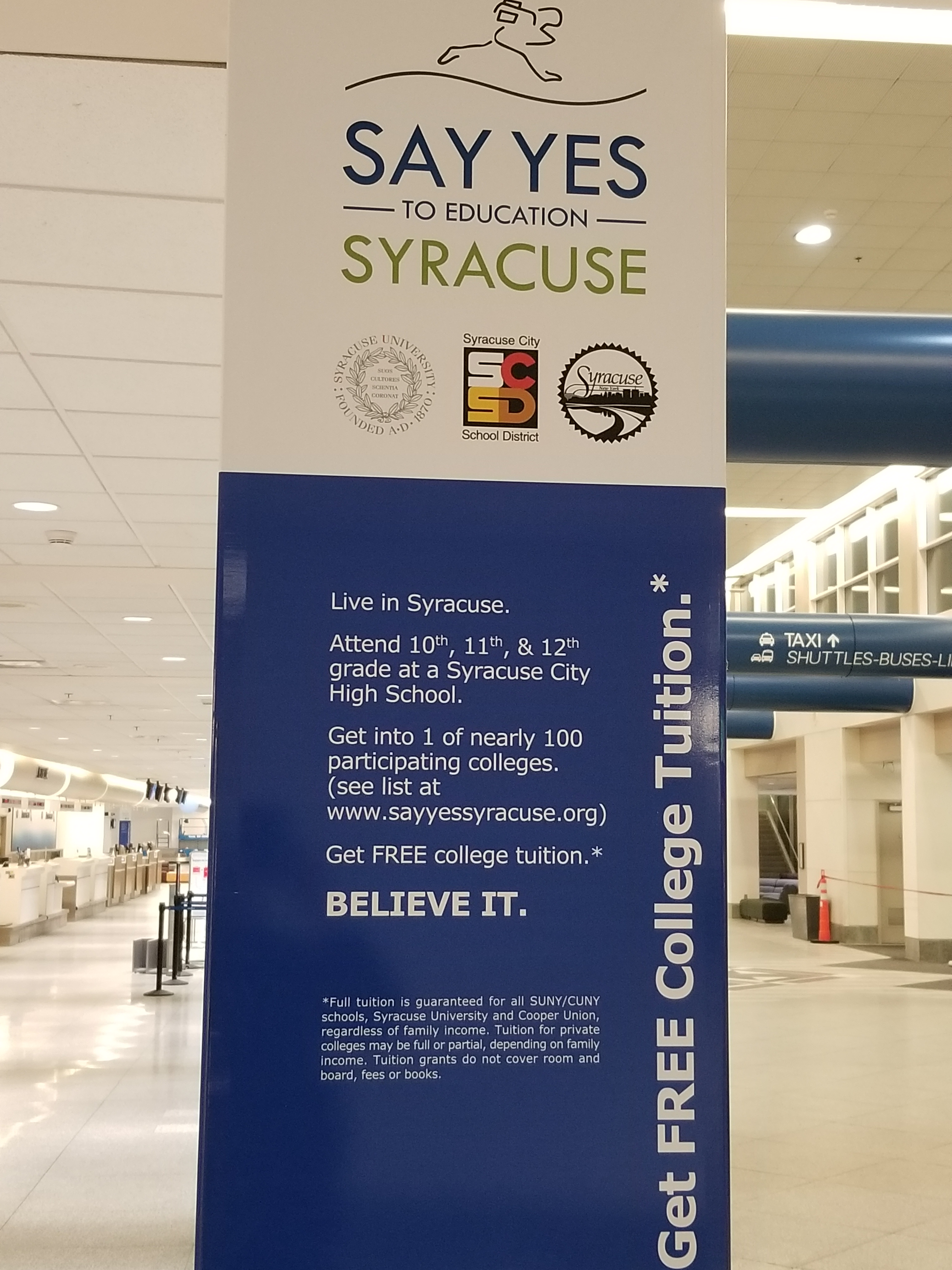
A Syracuse University "Say Yes to Education" signage at the Syracuse Airport

=== Syracuse, NY ===
The Syracuse Say Yes to Education and Economic Development program is the first district-wide establishment of the organization. The program is a collaboration between Say Yes, Syracuse University, and the Syracuse City School District aimed at bridging the achievement gap between urban and suburban children by focusing on academic, social-emotional, health, and financial obstacles facing low-income students.

The following support systems are offered through the Syracuse Say Yes to Education program: annual and regularly reviewed individual student growth plans; tutoring; identification of strengths and weaknesses through student diagnostic testing; inclusive settings, curriculum, and support for students with disabilities and English language learners; after-school and summer school programs; counseling and family engagement; research-based academic programs such as International Baccalaureate often found in suburban schools; financial aid and college selection counseling; and mentoring.

The Syracuse Higher Education Compact is a partnership between private and public institutions to "collectively provide the opportunity for Say Yes graduates in the city of Syracuse to attend college with tuition, fees, and books paid for." As of November 2010, 23 private schools were promising Syracuse City School District students free college tuition, including Adelphi University, Bryant & Stratton College, Clarkson University, Columbia University, Cooper Union, Goodwin College, Hartwick College, Hobart and William Smith Colleges, Houghton College, Le Moyne College, Manhattanville College, Marist College, Medaille College, Molloy College, New York Institute of Technology, New York University, Polytechnic University, Rensselaer Polytechnic Institute, Rochester Institute of Technology, Sarah Lawrence, Syracuse University, Tufts University, University of Pennsylvania, and University of Rochester. In addition, "SUNY and CUNY campuses are taking part with help from $1.5 million in community foundation funds." Schools participating in the Higher Education Compact require students to explore all other financial aid options before a scholarship is provided, and some of the schools place a $75,000 income cap on the scholarships.

=== Buffalo, NY ===
In December 2011, Say Yes to Education announced that Buffalo would be its second Say Yes City in the United States.

== Approach ==
Say Yes used its services to target what the organization views as four major problem areas affecting low-income students from having access to post-secondary education: social/emotional obstacles, health obstacles, academic obstacles, and financial obstacles.

To target academic obstacles, Say Yes used a diagnostic assessment to provide early intervention by determining the support needed for students based on each individual's strengths and weaknesses. Other services provided include after-school programs, "Power Hour" tutoring for students with the most risk of not advancing to the next grade level, encouraged parental participation, summer programs, career exploration, professional development for teachers, and Say Yes involvement in all students' Individual Education Plans.

To target health obstacles, Say Yes had "structured partnerships with hospitals and other health care providers to offer physical and mental health services as well as dental care."

For financial obstacles, Say Yes offered the students in its program scholarships to vocational institutes and two and four-year colleges. Financial assistance was also provided at these same post-secondary institutes to parents and siblings of Say Yes students.

Say Yes targeted social/emotional obstacles with services such as counseling, intervention, and conflict resolution. Say Yes Program Managers, who were often licensed social workers, conducted family outreach through home visits and meetings. Program Managers "also provide[d] information and support for Say Yes families and youth to help them select appropriate courses and navigate the college admissions process."

== Impact ==
Out of the 112 Belmont Program students offered a free college education in 1987, 65 graduated from high school, and 5 more received a GED. This accounts for more than 62% of the Say Yes cohort, while 26% of the students in classes preceding the group and 28% of students following the group completed high school. 44 of these 70 students pursued a post-secondary education, with 21 completing bachelor's degrees, 9 receiving associate's degrees, and 14 earning trade certificates. 34 of the original 112 students dropped out of school, and 8 students died, all but one in a violent manner.

Of the 76 students in the Hartford Chapter, 79% received a high school diploma or GED. Those students went on to complete 11 trade certificates, 7 associate's degrees, 20 bachelor's degrees, and 4 master's degrees. From the Cambridge Chapter, 87% of the original 69 students completed high school, with 72% of those graduates completing a post-secondary education.

Some of the criticism directed at Say Yes has been that while the program "might have been a noble experiment that changed lives, its results have not approached its cost." Others have argued that young, at-risk students promised a free post-secondary education "could not begin to comprehend how they were supposed to use the 'abstract' gift to graduate from college."

== Partnerships ==
Say Yes also had partnerships with the National Center for Restructuring Education, Schools, and Teaching; the Dean Hope Center for Psychological and Educational Services; the Reading Specialist Program; and the Science Education Program from Teachers College, Columbia University.

== See also ==
- Education NGOs
