= Bruce E. Toll =

American homebuilder

- Born: April 29, 1943 (age 83)
- Education: B.A. University of Miami
- Occupation: businessman
- Known for: co-founder of Toll Brothers
- Spouse: Robbi S. Toll
- Children: Michelle Toll; Elizabeth Toll Feuer; Wendy Toll Topkis; Jennifer Toll Schulman
- Parent(s): Albert Toll; Sylvia Steinberg Toll
- Family: Robert I. Toll (brother)

Bruce E. Toll (born April 29, 1943) is an American businessman who co-founded the homebuilder company Toll Brothers.

== Early life and education ==
Toll was born to a Jewish family and grew up in Elkins Park, Pennsylvania. He is the son of Sylvia (née Steinberg) and Albert Toll. His father, who emigrated from Ukraine, was a millionaire investor who lost everything in the Wall Street crash of 1929. In 1965, Toll graduated with a B.A. from the University of Miami.

== Career ==
In 1967, Toll and his brother Robert I. Toll founded Toll Brothers with a focus on building luxury homes starting with a plot of land in Caln Township, Chester County, Pennsylvania given to them by their father. They grew the business using a conservative financial model always including a 10 percent expense cushion in all their project cost estimates, never assumed price appreciation during construction, and always used conservative sales estimates. Bruce was responsible for the book-keeping and Robert the legal side of the business. In the late 1980s, they expanded out of the Northeast to Washington, D.C., and in the mid-1990s, to California. The Tolls are credited with mass-producing luxury housing by taking a few standard home styles and increasing the scale several fold. Toll Brothers later expanded into building "active-adult" communities for the elderly affluent and urban high-rises for the newly affluent (Toll Brothers City Living). In 1998, Toll sold 5 million shares of Toll Brothers for $186.6 million although still remaining its second largest shareholder and vice-chairman. In November 2013, Toll Brothers purchased Shapell Homes (founded by Nathan Shapell) for $1.6 billion. As of 2013, Toll Brothers has sold over 40,000 homes in twenty-two states.

Using the proceeds from his stock sale, he has diversified his investments. Toll is principal of real estate investor and developer, BET Investments, and has a diversified pool of investments, including National Renal Alliance of Franklin, Tennessee, a for-profit chain of 12 kidney-dialysis centers; Premier Kids Care Inc. of Atlanta, Georgia, which sells human-growth hormones; Puresyn Inc., a Malvern, Pennsylvania, company which develops gene vaccines and gene-therapies; Colonial Management Group L.P., an Orlando, Florida, chain of 50 methadone-treatment centers; UbiquiTel Inc., a Conshohocken, Pennsylvania, company that sells Sprint-branded PCS wireless service in the West and Midwest; Aquilent Inc., a Laurel, Maryland, company which provides IT services to the government; several automobile dealerships in the Philadelphia, Pennsylvania, area, including Reedman-Toll Auto World of Langhorne, Pennsylvania, one of the largest dealerships in the US.

== Philanthropy and accolades ==
Toll serves on the board of directors for the Home Builders Association of Bucks and Montgomery Counties, the Ben Franklin Technology Center of Southeastern Pennsylvania, Abington Memorial Hospital, and the Philadelphia Museum of Art. Toll typically donates to the Republican party.

== Personal life ==
Toll is married to Robbi S. Toll. Robbi is an interior designer and serves as secretary of the board of the National Museum of American Jewish History. They have four daughters; Michelle, Elizabeth, Wendy, and Jennifer. In 1997, his daughter Elizabeth married investor Leonard M. Tannenbaum; they divorced in 2010.

In 2010, Toll filed an unsuccessful lawsuit against Leonard M. Tannenbaum, his former son-in-law and founder and chief executive officer of Fifth Street Asset Management, alleging that Tannenbaum had promised and failed to pay his daughter Elizabeth half the profits from the management of Fifth Street's latest fund.
