= Simon Bauer =

French art collector (1862–1947)

- Born: 1862
- Died: 1947 (aged 84–85)
- Occupation: Businessman

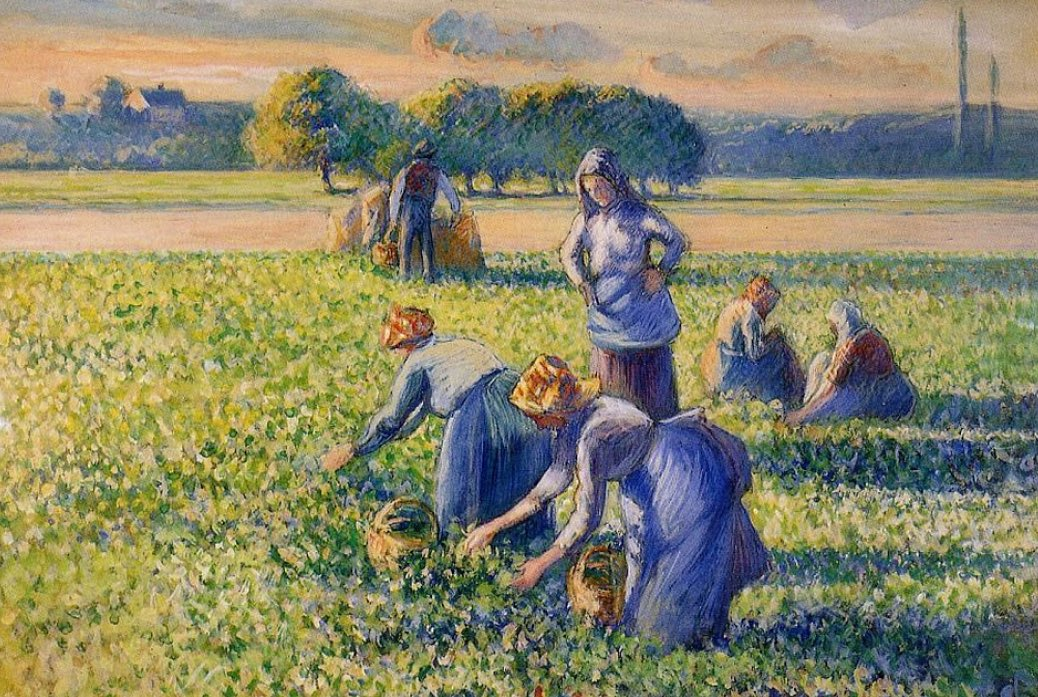
Picking Peas, Camille Pissarro, gouache, 1887. Part of the Bauer collection recovered in France in 2017.

Simon Bauer (1862–1947) was a Jewish businessman in France and a collector of Impressionist art. His collection was stolen by the Vichy government in October 1943. While some works have been recovered, most are still missing. The Simon Bauer collection included 93 works from the Impressionist movement. Since the liberation of France, some of the canvases have reappeared at auctions or exhibitions in museums.

== Early life ==
Simon Bauer was born in 1862 to a humble background. He made a fortune in the footwear business, selling his holdings at the age of 40, at which point he began to travel the world to make up for his lack of education.

== Art collection ==
According to the inventory taken at the time of its appropriation on 10 October 1943, Bauer's art collection comprised more than 90 works that included eleven by Pissarro, four by Sisley, four by Boudin, and one each by Degas and Berthe Morisot. The sale was entrusted to a merchant designated by the General Commissariat for Jewish Affairs (French: Commissariat Général aux Questions Juives).

The following year, in the summer of 1944, Bauer was interned at the Drancy internment camp but saved from deportation and likely death by a railway strike. He was released in September 1944 and tried to recover the paintings that had been stolen from him, but with little success. Some of them are kept in the Jeu de Paume museum in Paris, but most have disappeared.

== Death and legacy ==
Bauer died in 1947. His grandson, Jean-Jacques Bauer, has attempted to recover his grandfather's paintings. In 1965, he managed to locate two Pissarros but could not get restitution.

In 2013, the "treasure of Munich" was found in the hoard held by Cornelius Gurlitt.

In May 2017, Pissarro's Picking Peas (1887) was discovered at the Musée Marmottan Monet to whom it had been lent by Bruce and Robbi Toll, Jewish-American art collectors, for an exhibition. They had bought the painting in good faith for $800,000 at Christie's New York in 1995. A French court ordered the painting's restitution to the Bauer family without compensation to the Tolls.
