= Kest =

Kest may refer to:

- KEST, a radio station (1450 AM) licensed to San Francisco, California, United States
- Kest, a character in Nausicaä of the Valley of the Wind
- Bryan Kest (born 1964), an American yoga teacher
- Jodi Kest (born 1962), an American basketball coach
- Sol B. Kest (1922–2010), a Czech-American holocaust survivor and real estate developer
