= Witches in popular culture =

Representations of witchcraft in modern media

Any Old Fairy Tale, Arthur Wilde Parsons, 1919

Witches in popular culture appear in works of visual art, literature, film, and the mass media. The demonic iconography that became widespread in Western Europe from the 15th to the 18th centuries during the witch-hunts played a key role in shaping the stereotypical appearance of the witch, introducing many iconic attributes such as old women, pointed hats, flying broomsticks, and cats. Witches were portrayed as women who had fallen into immorality and depravity and made a pact with the Devil. The label of witch was an important instrument for controlling women, their autonomy, and their sexuality.

In the 19th century, witches were mentioned mainly as fairy-tale characters. Their image began to be romanticized as the authority of the Church weakened and national consciousness grew. Until the mid-20th century, works of fiction and films portrayed witches either as fallen women who had sold their souls to the Devil or as innocent victims of the Inquisition. The suffragist and feminist movements played an important role in improving perceptions of witches. A witch's magic became a metaphor for female power and independence. By the end of the 20th century, witches increasingly appeared as protagonists, and stories about teenage witches became popular.

The witch is a popular archetype in modern Western culture and one of the most popular Halloween costumes. Monuments to witches have been erected in several cities around the world.

== Formation of the image ==
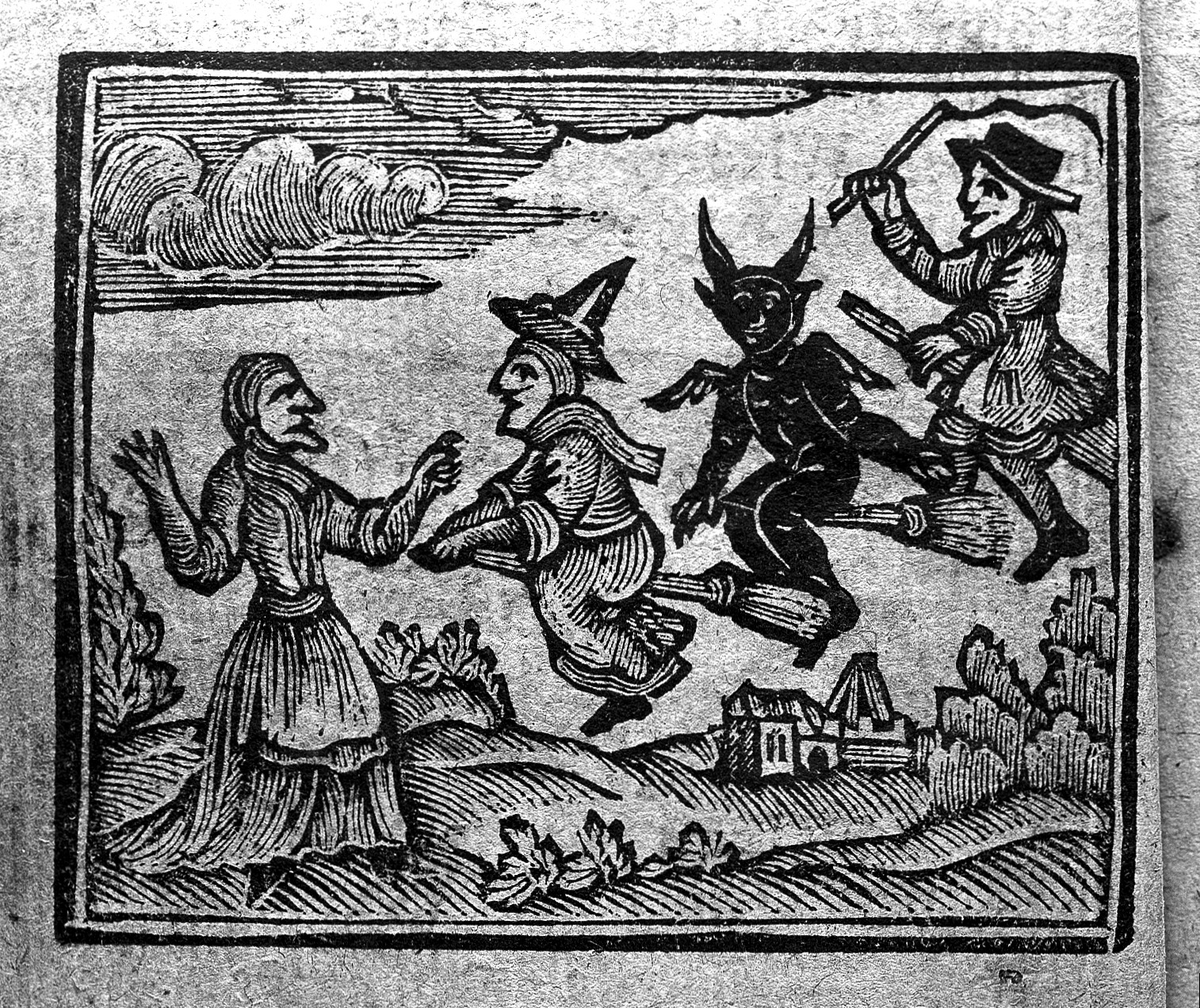
Witches and wizards flying on broomsticks, a 1720 engraving

Women who practiced folk magic existed in various periods and among different peoples, but with the spread of Christianity, witchcraft came to be equated with serving the Devil. Pagan traditions remained widespread among Europeans until late in the Middle Ages. Cunning women and priestesses who practiced pagan rites may have survived in medieval Europe, and Christianity regarded such practices as service to the Devil.

A satirical depiction of a witch carrying two Scotsmen on her broomstick, 1762

The image of the treacherous witch as a servant of the Devil began to spread widely during the Age of Enlightenment, against the background of the 16th- and 17th-century print revolution, which in turn contributed to a moral panic and mass accusations of witchcraft. According to approximate estimates, between 45,000 and 50,000 people were executed from 1400 to 1750, about 75 per cent of them women accused of witchcraft. In the United States, the most notorious episode was the Salem witch trials of 1692.

Perceptions of the witch were strongly influenced by the 1486 treatise Malleus Maleficarum, which describes witches as women who had fallen into unbelief and lust and sold their souls to the Devil. The text was strongly misogynistic, asserting that every woman was naturally inclined to treachery and could become a witch. Poor women who committed socially unacceptable acts, such as bearing children outside marriage, were often suspected of witchcraft. Healers and midwives, traditionally occupations held mainly by women, were also accused. This coincided with the masculinization of medicine and the spread of the idea that only men could be physicians. Widows were also frequently accused of witchcraft, because patriarchal society was especially fearful of women who were no longer under male control. Consequently, the image of the witch as a bitter and ugly old woman became especially popular.

The formation of the stereotypical witch in the popular imagination is associated with the demonic iconography widely disseminated during the 16th- and 17th-century print revolution. These images were closely connected with sexism and ideas about women who failed to conform to social expectations. In Britain, for example, the image of a bitter old woman living alone, surrounded by cats and other animals, was widespread. In iconography, witches were generally portrayed as women who participated in witches' sabbaths—nocturnal gatherings involving dancing and rituals, with an undercurrent of eroticism. Many characteristic attributes of the witch appeared in 17th- and 18th-century engravings, including pointed hats, caps, cast-iron cauldrons, and flying broomsticks.

The stereotypical image of the witch is also connected with antisemitism. As early as the 13th century, the Fourth Council of the Lateran required Jews to wear distinctive pointed hats. As a result, Jews wearing such headgear came to be associated by the rest of the population with black magic, Satan worship, and other “sinful” practices of which they were often accused. Prejudice against Quakers, who wore distinctive tall hats, also influenced the stereotype. In 18th-century Germany, it was believed that witches killed pregnant women and infants. By the beginning of the 19th century, belief in witchcraft and evil witches had generally weakened, but it had become firmly rooted in European folklore.

== 18th and 19th centuries ==
The three witches, painted by George Cattermole, 1840

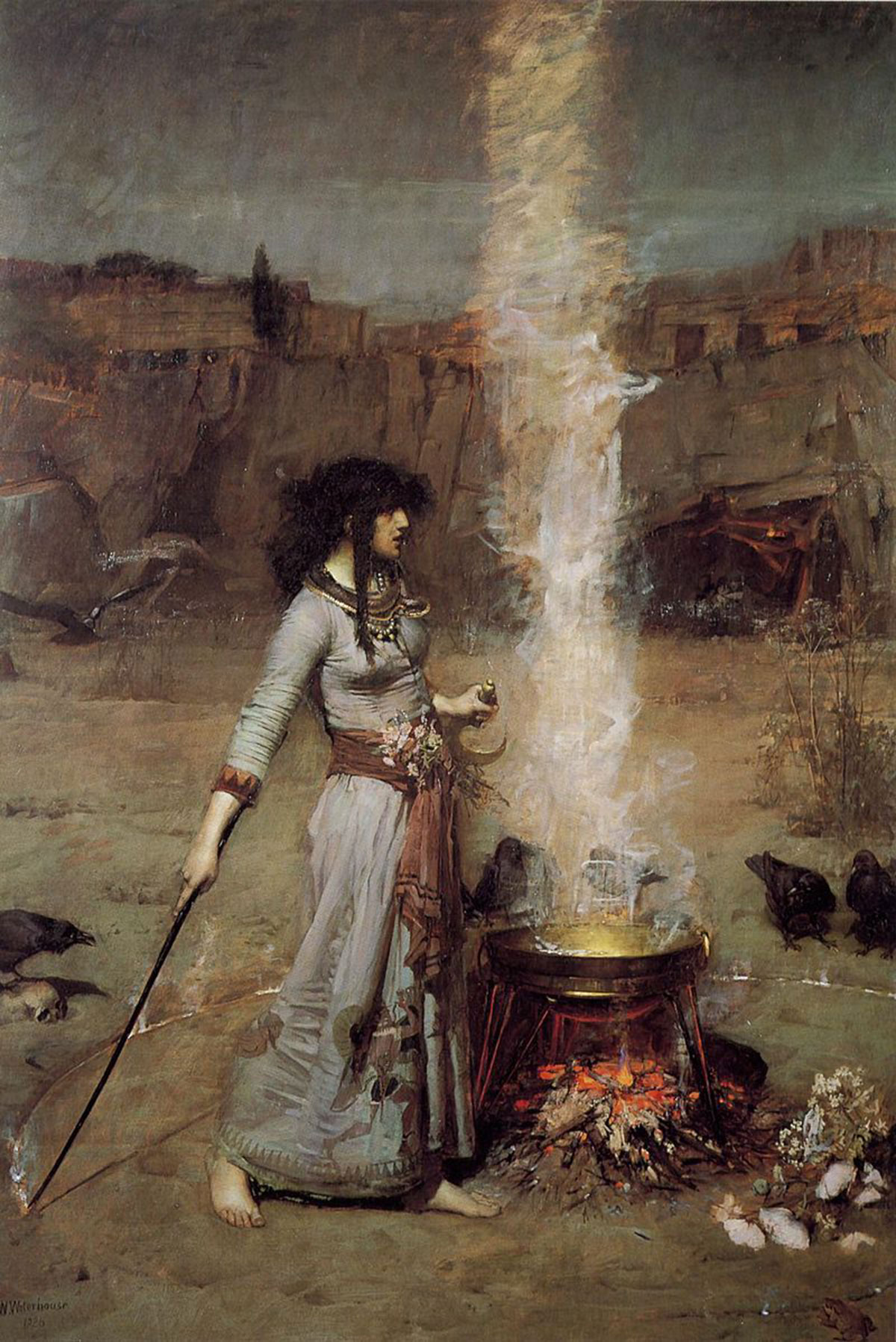
The Magic Circle, painted by John William Waterhouse, 1886

In Faust (1772–1831), a philosophical tragedy by the German writer Johann Wolfgang von Goethe, witches appear in the “Witch's Kitchen” and “Walpurgis Night” scenes. Their depictions draw on stereotypes widespread at the time: they are vulgar and bloodthirsty creatures who ride broomsticks, fly out of chimneys, serve the Devil, laugh uncontrollably, and cast spells. At the same time, the witches in this work are largely satirical and are used in the context of criticism of Christianity. Witches, witches' sabbaths, and sacrifices are common subjects in paintings by the Spanish artist Francisco Goya.

The positive reinterpretation and romanticization of the witch began in the early 19th century, as the authority of the Church weakened and national consciousness grew. The image was reinterpreted by Jacob Grimm, who presented witches in his writings as wise pagan healers and sorceresses unjustly persecuted by the Church. Examples include the tales “Mother Hulda” and “One-Eye, Two-Eyes, and Three-Eyes”, which depict a struggle between a good witch and an evil one. Jacob Grimm sought to collect ancient pre-Christian traditions and drew parallels with non-Christian mythology, such as the Greek Moirai. His research reflected the growth of German national consciousness and increasing interest in pre-Christian culture. On the basis of the traditions he collected, Grimm proposed that pagan priestesses worshiped goddesses and that their cults were matriarchal, which was perceived as a challenge to the patriarchal authority of the Church. His brother Wilhelm Grimm, by contrast, portrayed witches in his collection of fairy tales within the Christian folklore of the Enlightenment as treacherous servants of the Devil, thus reinforcing the stereotype in the popular imagination.

The French historian and supporter of the French Revolution, Jules Michelet, also developed a positive image of the witch in Satanism and Witchcraft, portraying witches as pagan sorceresses who opposed the Church. Like Grimm, he helped to popularize interest in pre-Christian Frankish mythology. In Michelet's interpretation, witches were healers, pagans, and outcasts forced to hide in the forests but who continued secretly to help people by preparing medicines, healing the sick, delivering babies, and performing abortions. Michelet believed that accusations of lust served to suppress and control female sexuality. The positive image of the witch proposed by Grimm and Michelet was subsequently adopted by the suffragist movement; in particular, it was actively promoted in the late 19th century by the suffragist Matilda Joslyn Gage.

By the late 19th century, popular depictions of witches included attractive and sexualized women, appearing in Halloween postcards and advertisements. Over time, witches also came to be portrayed more generally as women possessing magical powers. The feminist and suffragist Matilda Joslyn Gage argued in her 1893 book Woman, Church and State that witch trials had been used to deprive women of their rights.

== 20th century ==
Witches became key characters in L. Frank Baum's 1900 children's novel The Wonderful Wizard of Oz, which features the good witches Glinda and the Witch of the North, as well as the evil Wicked Witch of the West, depicted wearing a tall, conical witch hat. The green-skinned Wicked Witch of the West, portrayed by Margaret Hamilton in the 1939 film adaptation, had a hooked nose, warts and a pointed black hat. Her appearance became an influential screen depiction of the stereotypical witch.

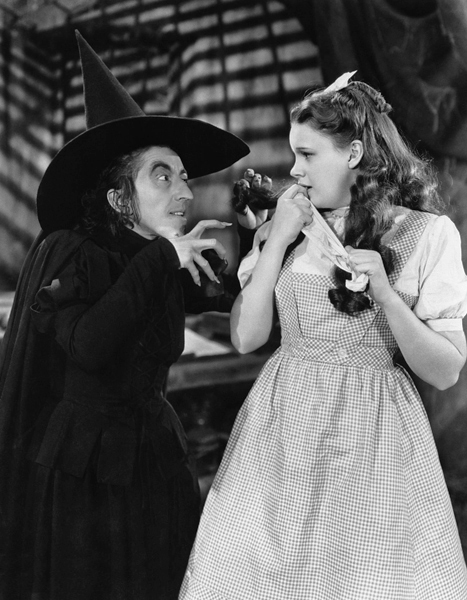
The Wicked Witch of the West, portrayed by Margaret Hamilton, threatens Dorothy Gale, played by Judy Garland, in the 1939 film The Wizard of Oz

Witches first appeared in cinema in the 1922 documentary film Häxan. In films of the first half of the 20th century, witches generally embodied either absolute evil or the innocent victim. The trope of the powerless victim was particularly widespread in historical dramas dealing with the Inquisition and witch-hunts, such as Witchfinder General (1968) and Black Sunday (1960). The trope of the evil witch as a servant of the Devil frequently appeared in horror films: such a character was portrayed as seductive, feminine, and morally corrupt, but death and decay lay behind her attractive exterior. In the end, she was usually defeated by a male hero, who restored the disrupted order; this plot appears, for example, in The Blood on Satan's Claw and Rosemary's Baby. In horror films, witches could pose as nuns within the nunsploitation genre. Several well-known witch films were released in the 1970s, including Mark of the Devil, Cry of the Banshee, and Suspiria. Witch films appeared less often in the 1980s as slasher films became dominant; among the most successful were Warlock and Witchcraft.

From the second half of the 20th century onward, the image of the witch in popular culture became increasingly neutral and even positive. This development was preceded in part by the repeal of Britain's Witchcraft Act in 1951, which sparked renewed interest in paganism and consequently the emergence of Wiccan and neo-pagan movements in the 1960s and 1970s in conjunction with second-wave feminism. In feminist thought, witches were healers and wise women who did not conform to the gender norms dictated by the Church and patriarchy. This image was examined and promoted by feminist writers including Catherine Clément, Barbara Ehrenreich, Andrea Dworkin, Deirdre English, and others.

From this period onward, depictions of witches in fiction became increasingly complex and multifaceted. Magic began to be used as a metaphor for female power, rather than as a symbol of evil or a reason for punishment. The film Season of the Witch (1972), for example, can be viewed as a feminist statement: its heroine uses magic to resist her domineering husband and draws other housewives into it. The television series Bewitched (1964–1972), in which a witch is the protagonist and conceals her abilities from her husband and those around her, became widely popular. The series established for the first time the archetype of a witch whose neutral, innate magic was inherited rather than acquired through a pact with the Devil or occult practice; this archetype subsequently became widespread.

Created by writer George Gladir and artist Dan DeCarlo, Sabrina Spellman first appeared in Archie's Mad House #22 in 1962. Her popularity led to the 1971 launch of the solo comic series Sabrina the Teenage Witch, whose stories combined her life as an ordinary teenager with her efforts to learn to control her supernatural powers. The character subsequently became a lasting representation of the teenage witch in popular culture. The teenage witch emerged as a major American cultural trope in the decades following the Second World War, appearing in comics, film, television and literature.

== 1990s to the present ==
Stories about teenage witches became popular from the 1990s onward, including Sabrina the Teenage Witch, Buffy the Vampire Slayer, The Craft, and Chilling Adventures of Sabrina. In these works, magic serves as a metaphor for rebellion, personal autonomy, and overcoming difficulties. The television series Charmed, in which the heroines fight the forces of evil and which explores female solidarity and sisterhood, acquired cult status. Another well-known production is American Horror Story: Coven, which portrays a secret community of witches forced to fight for its survival. The Marvel character Agatha Harkness, originally depicted in the comics as an elderly witch and mentor to the Scarlet Witch, was adapted as an initially antagonistic but increasingly complex character portrayed by Kathryn Hahn in WandaVision and its spin-off Agatha All Along. The latter series places Agatha within a coven of socially marginalized witches and presents its members as neither wholly heroic nor wholly villainous. Critics interpreted this portrayal of powerful, predominantly older women—whose identities are not defined by romantic relationships—as part of the broader reclamation of the witch as a symbol of female autonomy and resistance.

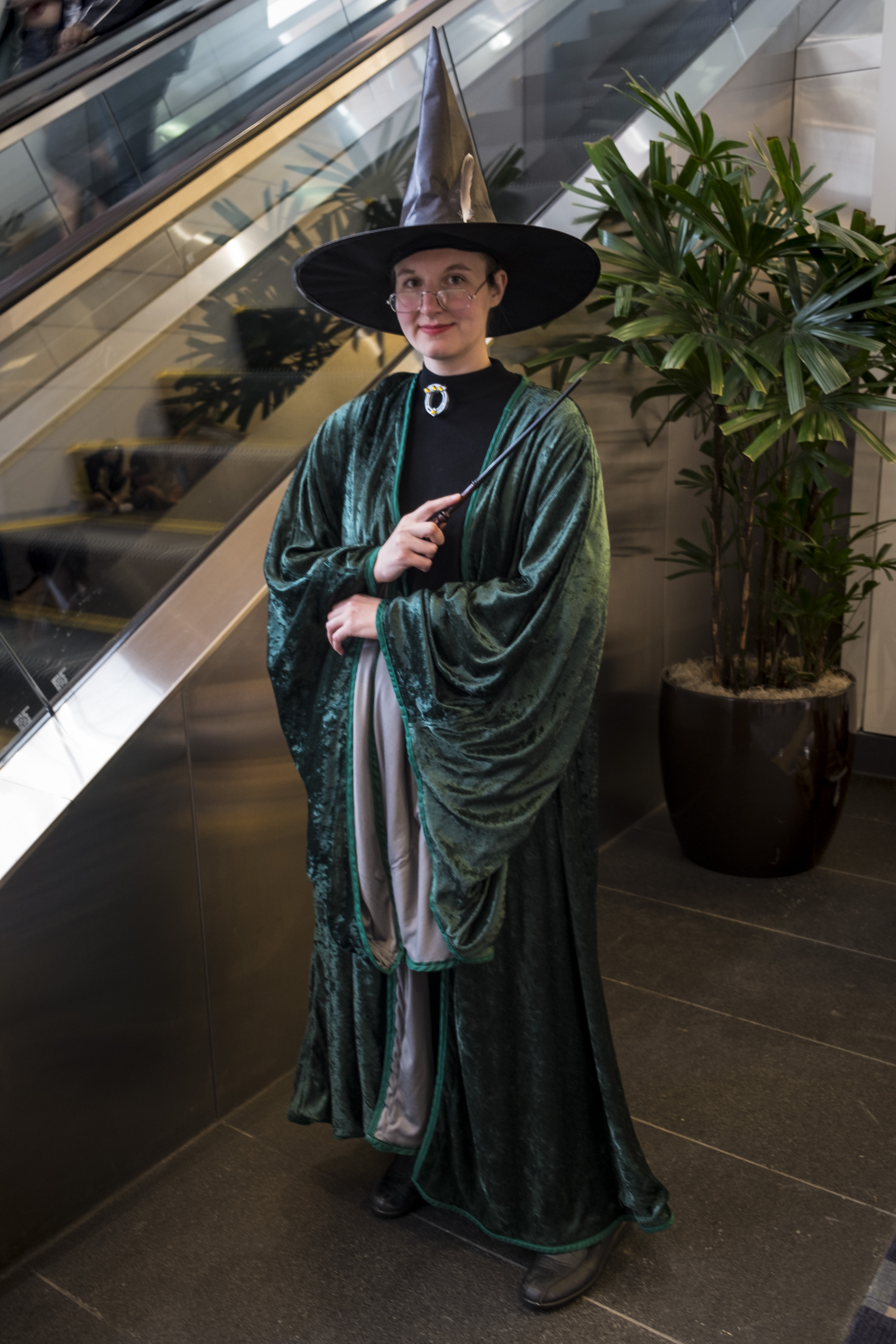
Cosplay of Minerva McGonagall from Harry Potter

The Harry Potter book series and its film adaptations became a major cultural phenomenon, making their witches, wizards and magical world widely recognizable elements of popular culture. J. K. Rowling constructed a hidden magical society whose fictional traditions draw upon folklore, mythology and earlier literature, while elements of its magic are based partly on Renaissance traditions including alchemy, astrology and natural philosophy.

Wikipe-tan dressed as a witch and magical girl

Evil witches and associations between magic and the Devil remained popular plot elements in horror and Action films. Examples include Thinner, The Blair Witch Project, Drag Me to Hell, Hansel & Gretel: Witch Hunters, The Lords of Salem, The Last Witch Hunter, and The Witches.

Around the turn of the 20th and 21st centuries, witches came to be treated as female representatives of a distinct occult character class—the mage or sorcerer—in fantasy- and medieval-themed tabletop role-playing and video games. Witches appear in most role-playing games and fantasy MMORPGs, for example The Elder Scrolls V: Skyrim and Trine 3: The Artifacts of Power. Depictions of witches in video games were strongly influenced by the tabletop game Dungeons & Dragons. As characters, witches may be evil, as in Resident Evil Village, Left 4 Dead, and Bloodborne, or positive, such as Yennefer in The Witcher 3: Wild Hunt and Lulu in Final Fantasy X. The protagonist of Bayonetta, who wears a sexualized latex outfit, offers an unconventional depiction of a witch. In indie adventure games and visual novels, witches are often heroines and teenage girls.

Witches are popular occult characters in Japanese anime series, including Tokimeki Tonight, Izetta: The Last Witch, Black Clover, Strike the Blood, Soul Eater, Flying Witch, Nurse Angel Ririka SOS, Sugar Sugar Rune, Re:Zero − Starting Life in Another World, Witch Hunter Robin, Wandering Witch: The Journey of Elaina, Little Witch Academia, and Kiki's Delivery Service. In Japanese media, the witch theme may overlap with the magical girl genre. The series Sally the Witch, whose protagonist flies on a broomstick and uses magic, was a progenitor of the magical-girl genre. For the same reason, witch and magical-girl archetypes often coexist in anime series: both are combined in Witchy Pretty Cure!, Cardcaptor Sakura, Ojamajo Doremi, and Sugar Sugar Rune. Witches may also act as antagonists or dark alter egos of magical girls, as in Sailor Moon and Puella Magi Madoka Magica. A similar opposition between witches and magical girls appears in the Italian animated series Winx Club, whose principal recurring antagonists, the Trix, are a trio of witches who battle the fairy heroines.

The witch is a popular archetype in modern Western culture and one of the most popular Halloween costumes. Monuments to witches have been erected in several cities around the world, including Thale in Germany, Edinburgh in Scotland (the Witches' Well), and Salem, Massachusetts, in the United States (in memory of the Salem witch trials).

== Criticism ==
Heather Stephenson, editor of Tufts University's Tufts Magazine, observed that the witch has become a harmless element of modern popular culture and is especially popular at Halloween. In her view, however, the dark and tragic history of the archetype, associated with prejudice, harassment, and the persecution of particular groups, should not be forgotten. Stephenson specifically criticized what she regarded as the rather cynical tourist industry in Salem, Massachusetts, where the witch has been turned into a commercial brand, particularly during Halloween celebrations.

Erick DuPree of The Wild Hunt argued that society's perception of the witch directly reflects gender stereotypes and attitudes towards women's rights. In his view, the witch originated as an expression of collective fear of female power, dissent, and nonconformity with social norms. Until the 19th century, the figure was consistently demonized; it was then viewed with either hostility or sympathy, and in the 20th century it gradually came to be accepted, albeit with qualifications. For example, the protagonist of the cult series Bewitched is forced to conceal her magical powers, reflecting the expectations placed on women in the 1960s—to restrain their ambitions and conform to the role of an obedient housewife. By contrast, Sabrina the Teenage Witch, released after third-wave feminism, depicts a heroine who does not conceal her magic; her abilities become a metaphor for power and independence. Charmed explores sisterhood and female power, reflecting society's broader acceptance of feminist ideas. Series released from the 2010s onward, such as Chilling Adventures of Sabrina and American Horror Story: Coven, present witches as darker and more dangerous figures who are forced to defend themselves against external threats. These interpretations correspond to ideas associated with fourth-wave feminism, particularly themes of female anger and resistance to patriarchy.

== See also ==
- List of films about witchcraft
