= Wild Hunt (disambiguation) =

The Wild Hunt is a folklore motif that typically involves a chase led by a mythological figure escorted by a ghostly or supernatural group of hunters engaged in pursuit.

Wild Hunt may also refer to:

- Transcendental Étude No. 8 (Liszt) "Wilde Jagd" ("Wild Hunt"), an 1837 work by Franz Liszt
- Hellboy: The Wild Hunt, the ninth collected edition of the Dark Horse Comics series Hellboy
- "The Wild Hunt" (Adventure Time), a television episode
- The Wild Hunt (film), a 2009 film directed by Alexandre Franchi
- "The Wild Hunt" (Grimm), an episode of Grimm
- The Wild Hunt, a novel by Jane Yolen
- The Wild Hunt (The Tallest Man on Earth album), 2010
- The Wild Hunt (Watain album)
- "The Wild Hunt", a track on Therion's Vovin album
- "The Wylde Hunt", a track on Omnia's Crone of War album
- The Witcher 3: Wild Hunt, a 2015 video game
- The Wild Hunt (periodical), an online neopagan news source

== See also ==
- Wild Huntsman (comics)
