= Universitatea Alternativă =

The Alternative University
- Universitatea Alternativă
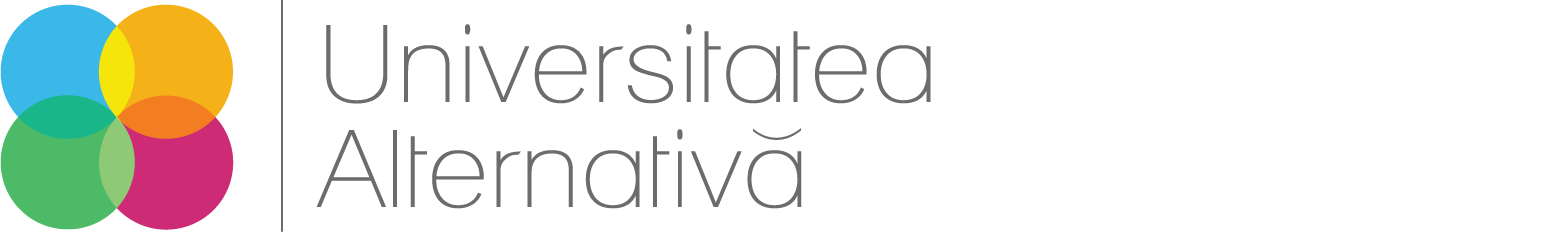
- Type: Informal education project, (Unaccredited) Alternative University
- Established: 2008
- Parent institution: CROS - Centrul de Resurse pentru Organizații Studențești (Resource Center for Student Organisations), a Romanian Education NGO
- Administrative staff: 9
- Students: 200
- Location: Bucharest, Romania; 44.4485°N 26.1041°E
- Colors: Blue, Yellow, Green and Magenta
- Website: universitateaalternativa.ro

Universitatea Alternativă (en: The Alternative University) is an informal education project developed by CROS - Centrul de Resurse pentru Organizații Studențești, an Education NGO in Bucharest, Romania. The project aims to provide a different learning experience to its students, focusing on autonomy and freedom of its students.

Wishing to meet the demand for reform of the public educational system in Romania felt by some students, a group of five students from Politehnica University of Bucharest decided to establish CROS (which will later develop Universitatea Alternativă), as an environment for NGOs led by students.

== Learning Communities ==
Currently, Universitatea Alternativă is organised into 6 learning communities, Incubatorul de Afaceri (entrepreneurship), New Media School (communication and media), .edu (education), SyncerSchool (management), HRemotion (human resources) and Vânzări (sales and marketing).

== Approach ==
Universitatea Alternativă centers its vision on the needs on the student, allowing them to propose courses, the staff making sure the resources are available. All courses start from a real-world model, gradually building up to a theoretical model, through analysis of different situations, relevant to its students.

During a year, the students embrace the values of relating, learning, playing, sharing and dreaming.

== Controversies ==
Despite claiming to be a university, Universitatea Alternativă is not acknowledged as such by the Romanian Ministry of National Education and Scientific Research, nor is it legally able to award officially recognized educational diplomas, unlike most alternative universities worldwide.
