= David Wolpe =

American rabbi (born 1958)

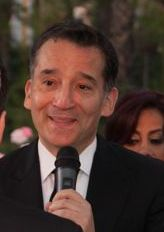
- Wolpe officiating at a wedding in Los Angeles
- Born: David J. Wolpe; September 19, 1958 (age 68)
- Occupations: Rabbi, author, educator

David J. Wolpe (born September 19, 1958) is an American rabbi and author. He was Visiting Scholar at Harvard Divinity School and is now the Max Webb Rabbi Emeritus of Sinai Temple. He previously taught at the Jewish Theological Seminary of America in New York, the American Jewish University in Los Angeles, Hunter College, and UCLA. Wolpe was named the most influential Rabbi in America by Newsweek in 2012, and among the 500 most influential Angelinos in 2016 and 2018. Wolpe now serves as the Inaugural rabbinic fellow for the ADL, and a senior advisor for the Maimonides Fund. Wolpe resigned from an advisory group on antisemitism assembled by Harvard President Claudine Gay in December 2023 in response to what Wolpe characterized as a hostile environment to Jews at Harvard.

Ordained by the Jewish Theological Seminary of America in New York in 1987, Wolpe is a leader in Conservative Judaism.

== Career ==
Wolpe has taught at the Jewish Theological Seminary of America in New York, and served as assistant to the Chancellor of that institution; at the University of Judaism (now the American Jewish University) in Los Angeles; and at Hunter College in New York, at UCLA and at Harvard. He frequently is featured on documentaries on Biblical topics produced by A&E Networks (A&E, The Biography Channel, History Channel and History Channel International). Wolpe wrote a regular weekly column for Time, and for the New York Jewish Week for almost 30 years. Wolpe's book, Why Faith Matters, is both an answer to books about atheism and a recounting of his battle with illness (he has undergone two surgeries for a brain tumor and chemotherapy for lymphoma). He has had public debates with Christopher Hitchens, Sam Harris, Steven Pinker, Roger Cohen, Richard Dawkins, Matt Ridley, Bishop Barron, and Indian yogi and mystic Sadhguru, among others. Wolpe is the model for Jacob Kappelmacher, the rabbi detective in J. M. Appel's best-selling mystery novel, Wedding Wipeout (2012).

Wolpe is the Max Webb Rabbi Emeritus of Sinai Temple. He served as Senior Rabbi at Sinai Temple for 26 years before he retired on June 30, 2023.

== Missions to Israel ==
Wolpe has led numerous missions to Israel. The first, in June 2002, was a solidarity mission at the height of the Second Intifada that broke out after the Camp David peace talks. The second, in May 2005, was a mission of gratitude to pick up the Torah commissioned in honor of his recovery from brain surgery. The third, in July 2006, at the height of the 2006 Israel-Hezbollah War, was another solidarity mission that covered Jerusalem, Haifa, and Sderot. In the midst of the second intifada, Wolpe raised three million dollars for victims of terror in a single morning at his synagogue. Wolpe also led the largest American Israel Public Affairs Committee (AIPAC) delegation ever assembled from one synagogue to the AIPAC conference in Washington in 2008, 2009, 2010, 2011, and 2012 with numbers ranging from 230 to 300 delegates. Wolpe also traveled to Haiti to help his friend, writer Mitch Albom, rebuild an orphanage.

== Historicity of the Exodus ==
On Passover 2001, Wolpe told his congregation that "the way the Bible describes the Exodus is not the way it happened, if it happened at all." Casting doubt on the historicity of the Exodus during the holiday that commemorates it brought condemnation from congregants and several rabbis (especially Orthodox Rabbis). The ensuing theological debate included whole issues of Jewish newspapers such as The Jewish Journal of Greater Los Angeles and editorials in The Jerusalem Post, as well as an article in the Los Angeles Times. Critics asserted that Wolpe was attacking Jewish oral history, the significance of Passover and even the First Commandment. Orthodox Rabbi Ari Hier wrote that "Rabbi Wolpe has chosen Aristotle over Maimonides, theories and scientific method over facts". Wolpe, on the other hand, was defended by Reform Rabbi Steven Leder from the Wilshire Boulevard Temple, who argued that "defending a rabbi in the 21st century for saying the Exodus story isn't factual is like defending him for saying the earth isn't flat. It's neither new nor shocking to most of us that the earth is round or that the Torah isn't a history book dictated to Moses by God on Mount Sinai."

Wolpe asserted that he was arguing that the historicity of the events should not matter, since he believes faith is not determined by the same criteria as empirical truth. Wolpe argues that no archeological digs have produced evidence of the Jews wandering the Sinai Desert for forty years, and that excavations in Israel consistently show settlement patterns at variance with the Biblical account of a sudden influx of Jews from Egypt.

In March 2010, Wolpe expounded on his views saying that it was possible that a small group of people left Egypt, came to Canaan, and influenced the native Canaanites with their traditions. He added that the controversy of 2001 stemmed from the fact that Conservative Jewish congregations have been slow to accept and embrace biblical criticism. Conservative rabbis, on the other hand, are taught biblical criticism in rabbinical school.

== Gay marriage ==
In 2013, Wolpe announced that he would officiate same-sex marriages at Sinai Temple. The decision drew opposition from some members of Los Angeles's Persian Jewish community; Wolpe told The New York Times that close to half of the congregation was unhappy with the policy. The dispute also had a generational dimension, with Rabbi Ed Feinstein describing stronger opposition among first-generation Persian Jewish immigrants than among second-generation Persian Americans. Wolpe defended the policy on the grounds that Conservative Judaism permitted new interpretations of Jewish law and that same-sex couples should be able to enter sanctified relationships.

== Article on Paganism ==
On December 25, 2023, Wolpe published an article in The Atlantic entitled "The Return of the Pagans," taking aim at both Donald Trump and "the left" by critiquing them as two expressions of what he calls "Paganism", claiming that "there's something a little pagan" about self-identified Christian Donald Trump. An editorial in the pagan periodical The Wild Hunt focused on a "lack of familiarity… glaring in the article", contending that Wolpe presents no first-hand knowledge about, or research into, present-day Pagans, instead "commingl[ing] Paganism with wealth and greed while also conflating it with the actions of former U.S. President Donald Trump and ubiquitous billionaire Elon Musk". Scholars who study Paganism also published a response in the form of an Open Letter, noting that "the main message of his article is that 'paganism,' not monotheism, is mostly responsible for the faults of the contemporary West" despite "the cultural dominance of monotheism over the past two thousand years" and precisely in relation to the trends that he condemns. Journalist Chrissy Stroop traces "the same breezy tropes Wolpe recycles" to "the writings of late nineteenth- and early twentieth-century Christian intellectuals", thus explaining his divergence from up-to-date scholarly and religious understandings of the topic.

== Personal life ==
Wolpe's brothers are the bioethicist Paul Root Wolpe, playwright and actor Rabbi Daniel Wolpe of Queens, NY, and Immunologist Stephen Wolpe of Maryland.

Wolpe is a committed vegetarian. Rob Eshman suggests that Wolpe "leans vegan". Wolpe serves on the Rabbinic Council of Jewish Vegetarians of North America.

Wolpe's father was Rabbi Gerald I. Wolpe, long time rabbi of Har Zion Temple in Penn Valley, Pennsylvania, and his grandfather was Allen Cross, one half of the vaudeville duo, Cross and Dunn.

== Published works ==
- The Healer of Shattered Hearts: A Jewish View of God (1991). ISBN 0-14-014795-0.
- In Speech and In Silence: The Jewish Quest for God (1992). ISBN 0-8050-2816-1.
- Teaching your Children About God: A Modern Jewish Approach (1995). ISBN 0-06-097647-0.
- Why be Jewish? (1995). ISBN 0-8050-3927-9.
- Making Loss Matter: Creating Meaning in Difficult Times (1999). ISBN 1-57322-820-6.
- Floating Takes Faith: Ancient Wisdom for a Modern World (2004). ISBN 0-87441-733-3.
- Why Faith Matters (2009). ISBN 0061633356.
- David: The Divided Heart (2014). ISBN 978-0300188783.

== Bibliography ==
- Faust, Avraham (2015). "The Emergence of Iron Age Israel: On Origins and Habitus". In Levy, Thomas E.; Schneider, Thomas; Propp, William H.C. (eds.). Israel's Exodus in Transdisciplinary Perspective. Quantitative Methods in the Humanities and Social Sciences. Springer. pp. 467–482. doi:10.1007/978-3-319-04768-3. ISBN 978-3-319-04768-3. ISSN 2199-0956.
