= Robert I. Toll =

American real estate businessman (1940–2022)

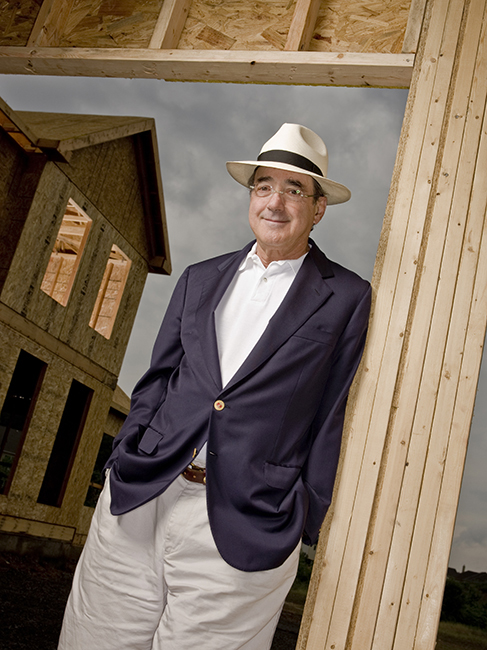
- Robert Toll in 2008
- Born: Robert Irwin Toll; December 30, 1940; Philadelphia, Pennsylvania, U.S.
- Died: October 7, 2022 (aged 81); New York City, U.S.
- Education: B.A. Cornell University; L.L.B. University of Pennsylvania Law School
- Occupation: Businessman
- Known for: Co-founder of Toll Brothers
- Spouse: Jane Toll
- Children: 5
- Parent(s): Albert Toll; Sylvia Steinberg Toll
- Family: Bruce E. Toll (brother)

Robert Irwin Toll (December 30, 1940 – October 7, 2022) was an American businessman who co-founded the luxury homebuilder company Toll Brothers.

== Biography ==
Robert Irwin Toll was born to a Jewish family, the son of Sylvia (née Steinberg) and Albert Toll, he grew up in Elkins Park, Pennsylvania. His father, who emigrated from Ukraine, was a millionaire investor who lost everything in the stock market crash of 1929. His first job was at Camp Powhatan in Otisfield, Maine where he was a counselor; it is now known as Seeds of Peace and is dedicated to bringing together Arab, Israeli, Indian, and Pakistani teenagers to promote peaceful conflict resolution. In 1963, he graduated with a B.A. from Cornell University; and in 1966, he earned an LL.B. degree, cum laude, from the University of Pennsylvania Law School. In 1967, Toll and his brother Bruce E. Toll founded Toll Brothers with a focus on building luxury homes ($500,000+) starting with a plot of land in Chester County, Pennsylvania given to them by their father. They grew the business using a conservative financial model always including a 10 percent cushion into all their projects and never assuming price appreciation during construction. Bruce was responsible for the book-keeping and Robert the legal side of the business. In the late 1980s, they expanded out of the Northeast to Washington, D.C. and in the mid-1990s, to California. The Tolls are credited with mass-producing luxury housing by taking a few standard home styles and increasing the scale several fold. Toll Brothers later expanded into building “active-adult” communities for the elderly affluent and urban high-rises for the newly affluent (Toll Brothers City Living).

In 2010, Toll stepped down as CEO of Toll Brothers although he still remained active in its management. In November 2013, Toll Brothers purchased Shapell Homes (founded by Nathan Shapell) for $1.6 billion.

== Philanthropy and accolades ==
In 1990, the Tolls sponsored 58 third graders in a program called Say Yes to Education guaranteeing a college education to each of them. He served on the board of directors of the Cornell Real Estate Council, the Metropolitan Opera, Seeds of Peace, and Beth Shalom Synagogue in Elkins Park, Pennsylvania. He was a long-time fundraiser for the American Red Cross and the American Cancer Society.

Toll was a member of the Democratic National Finance Committee during the Obama campaign. Toll also served on the Board of Overseers at the University of Pennsylvania Law School and as a trustee of the University of Pennsylvania where he established the Albert & Sylvia Toll Scholarship Foundation, named after his parents. In 2005, Toll was named CEO of the Year by Professional Builder Magazine. In 2007, 2008, and 2009, he was named the "Best CEO in the Homebuilders & Building Products industry" by Institutional Investor magazine.

== Personal life and death ==
Toll was married twice. In 1975, he married his second wife Jane (née Snyder Goldfein). They lived in Miami Beach, Florida. She has one son from her first marriage; Toll had two daughters from his first marriage; and they had a son and daughter together. As of March 2018, he was worth an estimated $1 billion.

Toll died in New York City from complications of Parkinson's disease on October 7, 2022, at the age of 81.
