= Leonard M. Tannenbaum =

American businessman

- Born: August 9, 1971 (age 55)
- Citizenship: United States of America
- Education: University of Pennsylvania
- Occupation: Entrepreneur/Financier/Investor
- Known for: Founder of TCG/Tannenbaum Capital Group and Fifth Street Asset Management Inc.
- Spouse: Robyn Tannenbaum (married 2019 to present) Stacy Thorne (married 2013-2016 divorced) Elizabeth Toll (married 1997-2010 divorced)
- Children: 6 children
- Parent(s): Adele Fuchsberg; Calvin M. Tannenbaum

Leonard M. Tannenbaum (born August 9, 1971) is the Founder of TCG/Tannenbaum Capital Group. TCG's mandate is committed to offering the market advantages in private credit and real estate. Previously, he was the Founder and chief executive officer of Fifth Street Asset Management, which was sold to Oaktree Asset Management in 2017. He also founded the pro-business political action committee "Keeping America Competitive".

== Early life and education ==
Tannenbaum was born to a Jewish family, the son of Adele Fuchsberg and Calvin M. Tannenbaum. His father was a managing partner of Brecher, Fishman, Feit, Heller, Rubin, & Tannenbaum, a law firm in New York; his mother was a district administrator for the Nassau County Board of Cooperative Educational Services and an exile from Cuba. He graduated with a BS in economics and an MBA in finance as part of a submatriculation program from the Wharton School of the University of Pennsylvania. He is a Chartered Financial Analyst holder. After school he worked as an equity analyst for Merrill Lynch.

== Career ==
In 1998, he founded Fifth Street Finance, a finance company specializing in raising funds from private investors and investing in small- and mid-sized companies. He raised $30 million ($15 million from his father-in-law, Bruce E. Toll) and established his first fund which made investments until 2004. In January 2005, he launched a second fund, Fifth Street Mezzanine Partners II which reached $157 million in value and included institutional investors such as DuPont, Sumitomo Bank and WP Global; the fund stopped investing in 2007. In 2007, he launched a third fund, which in 2008, after taking the advice of David Einhorn, he converted into a business development company (BDC). This entity, named Fifth Street Finance Corp., went public in May 2008. Fifth Street's customers were primarily private equity firms that invested in lower middle-market or middle-market companies (averaging $10 million in EBITDA). Investments average $35 million and never exceed $100 million. Effective September 2014, they received permission form the S.E.C. to increase the maximum investment across its platform to $250 million. Len was honored with the M&A Advisor Lifetime Achievement and Leadership Award and inducted into the M&A Advisor Hall of Fame. In 2017 Fifth Street Asset Management was sold to Oaktree Asset Management.

In 2023 he founded TCG/Tannenbaum Capital Group out of his family office and in July 2024 took a mortgage REIT, Sunrise Realty Trust public on the Nasdaq trading under the ticker SUNS. The company lends capital to qualified commercial real estate borrowers.

Tannenbaum is a supporter of the Palm Beach Zoo, Jewish Federation of Palm Beach, Wharton University, Yo Soy Ella, PA CASA Court Appointed Special Advocates for Children, Corners Outreach and Chess in the Schools.

Tannenbaum is also the Chairman of LMT Investments LLC and the President of the Leonard M. Tannenbaum Foundation.

== Personal life ==
In 1997, Tannenbaum married Elizabeth Toll, daughter of housing developer Bruce E. Toll, in a Jewish ceremony at the Ritz Carlton in Philadelphia. They had three children and divorced in October 2010.

In 2013, he married Stacey Thorne and the couple divorced in 2016.

Len married Robyn (Friedman) Tannenbaum in November 2019. They have two daughters.

He has six children.

Max was the president of Dream Dragons, a company launched by 13 high school students through the Southwestern Connecticut chapter of Junior Achievement program, which empowers young entrepreneurs.
