= Promenade Towers =

High-rise apartment complex in Los Angeles, California, United States

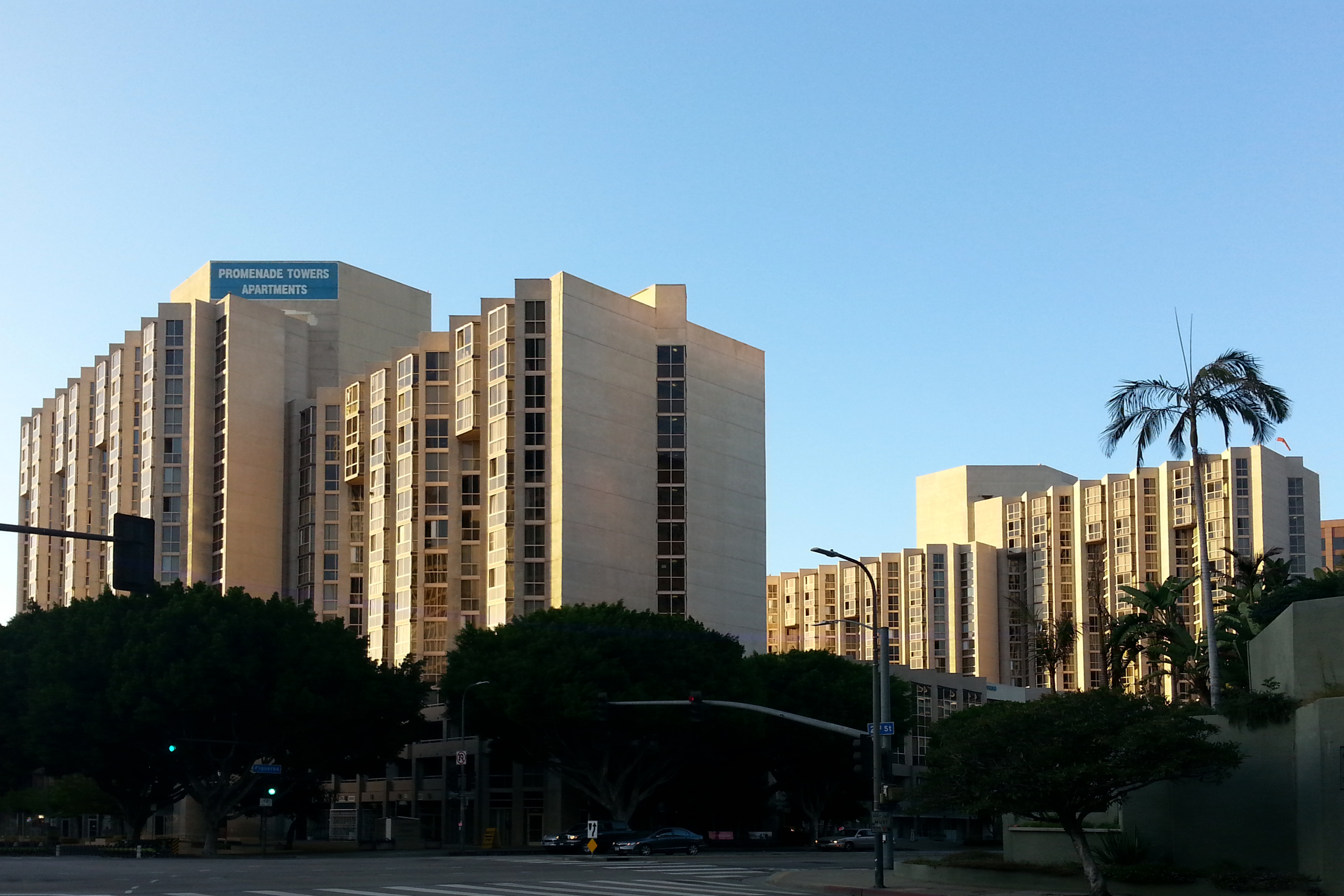
- Promenade Towers in 2016
- Interactive map of the Promenade Towers area

General information
- Status: Completed
- Architectural style: Modernist
- Location: 123 South Figueroa Street, Los Angeles, California, U.S.
- Completed: 1985

Technical details
- Floor count: 17; 19

Design and construction
- Architects: Kamnitzer & Cotton; Abraham Shapiro & Associates
- Developer: Jona Goldrich; Sol B. Kest; Nathan Shapell

Promenade Towers is a high-rise apartment complex in Bunker Hill, Los Angeles, California, U.S.. Developed by three Holocaust survivors, it was designed in the modernist architectural style, with palm trees and exotic plants between the towers, and completed in 1985.

== History ==
The towers were developed by Jona Goldrich, Sol B. Kest and Nathan Shapell, three Holocaust survivors. Their construction cost US$60 million to develop. The three developers had already built the Promenade and the Promenade West Condominiums in Downtown Los Angeles.

The towers, built on 4.26 acres in Bunker Hill, were completed in 1985. At the time, they formed the first privately owned apartment complex built in Downtown Los Angeles since 1970. In 1986, tenants included University of Southern California students. Meanwhile, the three developers decided to build the Grande Promenade, another apartment complex in Downtown Los Angeles, this time for US$200 million.

Former Los Angeles Dodger's manager Tommy Lasorda, leased an apartment in the Promenade Towers.

== Architecture ==
The buildings were designed in the modernist architectural style by Kamnitzer & Cotton-Abraham Shapiro & Associates. The northern tower is higher, reaching 252 feet (77 m) with 19 stories, while the southern tower is 225 feet (69 m) high, with 17 stories. They span 849,298 square feet.

In the spirit of architect Peter Kamnitzer, who believed apartment complexes should include greenery, there are palm trees and exotic plants between the two towers.
