= Jona Goldrich =

American real estate developer and philanthropist

- Born: Jona Goldreich; September 11, 1927; Lwow, Poland
- Died: June 26, 2016 (aged 88); Los Angeles, California, U.S.
- Education: Technion – Israel Institute of Technology
- Occupations: Businessman, philanthropist
- Spouse: Doretta Goldrich
- Children: Melinda Goldrich; Andrea Goldrich Cayton
- Relatives: Avram Goldrich (brother); Barry Cayton (son-in-law)

Jona Goldrich (born Jona Goldreich; September 11, 1927 – June 26, 2016) was an American real estate developer and philanthropist. Born in Lviv, he emigrated to Palestine in the midst of World War II, where he served in the 1948 Arab–Israeli War and worked for a labor union. By the 1950s, he emigrated to the United States, and he became a real estate developer and investor in Los Angeles County. A Holocaust survivor, he supported Jewish causes in Israel and the United States.

== Early life ==
Jona Goldreich was born in 1927 in Lviv (formerly Poland, present-day Ukraine). He received a degree in mechanical engineering from Technion – Israel Institute of Technology.

In 1942, in the midst of World War II, he escaped from the Nazis by trekking across Europe to Palestine with his brother, Avram Goldrich. However, their parents and another brother were murdered by the Nazis in concentration camps. Goldrich was thus a Holocaust survivor.

Goldrich fought in the 1948 Arab–Israeli War. He also worked for the labor union Histadrut in Haifa. He then immigrated to the United States, travelling to Los Angeles, California by bus in 1952.

== Career ==
Changing his surname to Goldrich, he started his career as a window screen installer in Los Angeles. In 1954, he founded Active Cleaning & Maintenance, a company focusing on cleaning up construction sites. By 1957, he developed an apartment building in North Hollywood. In 1978, his company "was fined $5,000 [...] for filing false payroll forms with the Department of Housing and Urban Development." It went bankrupt a few years later.

Goldrich co-founded a real estate development and management company known as Goldrich & Kest Industries with Sol B. Kest, a Holocaust survivor. In 1964, they developed Eldorado, a residential building located at 4425 Ventura Canyon Avenue in Sherman Oaks. They also developed Sutton Terrance, another residential building located at 6251 Coldwater Canyon Avenue in North Hollywood. Another apartment complex they developed, Sepulveda Village in Mission Hills, comprised 18 buildings, with the reception located at 10023 Sepulveda Boulevard. A year later, in 1965, they developed Northridge Village Townhouses, an apartment complex in Northridge, California. In 1981, they purchased hotels in Tenderloin, San Francisco.

With Mel Grau, Goldrich and Kest developed a new marina in Sunset Beach, California in 1969.

With Sheldon Appel, Goldrich and Kest redeveloped the former General Motors plant in South Gate in the 1980s. They also turned land near the Long Beach Airport into offices and retail spaces.

With Nathan Shapell, Goldrich and Kest developed some buildings in the Bunker Hill area of Downtown Los Angeles, including Promenade Towers, Grand Promenade and the California Plaza. They also owned Kings Villages, a 313 unit federally subsidized low-income housing project in Pasadena which they later sold to Thomas Pottmeyer & Co. In 1991, Pottmeyer was later sued by the city of Pasadena for allegedly violating civil rights and fair housing laws for allegedly discriminating against blacks in favor of Latinos. The lawsuit was the most expensive in the history of Pasadena. Additionally, they owned Green Hotel, a retirement home in Pasadena, and a government-subsidized retirement home in Santa Monica.

Goldrich was a member of the California Housing Council, the Community Redevelopment Agencies Association, and the Governmental Affairs Council of the Building Industry Association.

== Philanthropy ==
Goldrich served as the Chairman of the Western Region of the American Friends of Tel Aviv University (TAU) and on the Board of Governors of TAU. He endowed the Goldreich Family Institute for Yiddish Language, Literature, and Culture, the Goldreich Chair in International Banking, the Goldreich Family Theater Archives, the Goldreich Multipurpose Sports Center, the Goldreich Family Health and Fitness Center, and the Sender Goldreich Fitness Room at TAU. He was the recipient of an Honorary Doctorate from the university in 2005. He was recognized as one of four "philanthropic visionaries" alongside Guilford Glazer, Izak Parviz Nazarian and Max Webb by the American Friends of Tel Aviv University at the Beverly Wilshire Hotel in 2013.

Goldrich supported the Los Angeles Museum of the Holocaust. He was a member of the Society of Fellows of American Jewish University in Bel Air.

Goldrich was the 1985 recipient of the "Good Scout" Award from the Los Angeles County Boy Scouts. He made campaign contributions to Tom Bradley when the latter was the Mayor of Los Angeles. He served on the executive committee of the Los Angeles Police Crime Prevention Advisory Council.

The Goldrich Foundation has funded 'The Jona Goldrich Centre for Digital Storytelling', located inside the USC Shoah Foundation's newly expanded offices at the University of Southern California in Los Angeles. Jona Goldrich's life story has been turned into a public sculpture in the lobby of this space, by British artist Nicola Anthony. The text sculpture was commissioned by Melinda Goldrich and gifted to USC Shoah Foundation where it is on permanent display inside the Leavey Library, University of Southern California.

== Personal life ==
Goldrich and his wife Doretta resided in Beverly Hills, California. The couple had two daughters: Andrea, who is married to businessman Barry Cayton, owner of Audio Command Systems, and Melinda.

== Death ==
Jona Goldrich died on June 26, 2016, aged 88. He was survived by his wife, children, and brother.
