= David Shapell =

- Born: David Czapelski; February 4, 1921; Wolbrom, Olkusz County, Poland
- Died: February 8, 2015 (aged 94); Israel
- Occupations: Real estate developer, philanthropist
- Spouse: Fela Shapell
- Children: Rochelle Shapell; Benjamin Shapell; Irvin Shapell
- Relatives: Nathan Shapell (brother); Sala Shapell (sister); Max Webb (brother-in-law); Vera Guerin (niece)

David Shapell (February 4, 1921 – February 8, 2015) was a Polish-born American real estate developer and philanthropist from Los Angeles, California. A Holocaust survivor, he was the co-founder of one of the largest real estate development companies in Southern California. He supported Jewish charitable causes in the United States and Israel.

== Early life ==
David Shapell was born as David Czapelski on February 4, 1921, in Wolbrom, a shtetl in Poland. His father was a goose farmer.

During World War II, he escaped Poland and fought in the Polish army under Soviet control throughout the rest of the war. By the end of the war, most of his family members had been murdered by the Nazis, except for one brother, Nathan Shapell, and a sister.

Shortly after the war, he lived in Germany, and emigrated to the United States in the early 1950s.

== Career ==
Shapell first worked for a relative who owned a grocery store in Detroit, Michigan, alongside his brother Nathan.

In 1955, they moved to Los Angeles, California, and co-founded a real estate development company with their brother-in-law, Max Webb. It became known as Shapell Industries, one of the largest developers in Southern California. It was acquired by Toll Brothers in 2013.

== Philanthropy ==
He made charitable contributions to the Friends of the IDF, a fundraising organization for the Israel Defense Forces. He also endowed the Darche Noam yeshiva and the Midreshet Rachel women's seminary in Jerusalem. In 2006, he made a donation for the establishment of the David and Fela Shapell Family Shoah and Heroism Study Center for Youth at Yad Vashem in Jerusalem. Through the David and Fela Shapell Family Foundation, he has also endowed the David and Fela Shapell Digitalization Project at the National Library of Israel in Jerusalem. He has also endowed the David and Fela Shapell Family Center for Genetic Disorders Research at the Weizmann Institute of Science in Rehovot, Israel.

He served on the board of trustees of the Simon Wiesenthal Center in Los Angeles. In 2013, he made a donation of $15 million to the United States Holocaust Memorial Museum in Washington, D.C., where The David and Fela Shapell Family Collections and Conservation Center is named in his honor.

From 1979 to his death, Shapell, his wife and family paid an annual visit to Wolbrom or Auschwitz in honor of their relatives who were victims of Nazi Germany. During those visits, they said Jewish prayers, also known as Kaddish, and lit candles in their memory.

== Personal life ==
Shapell was an Orthodox Jew. He was married to Fela Shapell, a Holocaust survivor who was liberated from the Bergen-Belsen concentration camp at the end of the war, for sixty-five years. They had three children: Rochelle, Benjamin and Irvin. They resided in Los Angeles, California.

== Death ==
He died on February 8, 2015, in Israel after battling lung cancer and pneumonia. He was ninety-four years old. He was buried at the Eretz Hachaim Cemetery near Beit Shemesh, Israel.
