= Belmont 112 =

The Belmont 112, also known as the Belmont Program, was a poverty reduction project in the US city of Philadelphia. It was started by George Weiss, a philanthropist, to support 112 sixth-grade students at Belmont Elementary School by paying for their education through college if they met certain conditions.

== History ==
In 1987, philanthropist George Weiss began supporting 112 sixth-grade girls and boys from Belmont Elementary School in West Philadelphia. He guaranteed them that he would pay for their education through college if they met certain conditions, including that they did not use drugs, commit any crimes or have children unless they were married. In addition to paying for their college educations, Weiss's program supported the children by giving them tutors, counselors, after-school programs, and medical and dental care.

The program was the first project of Say Yes to Education, a nonprofit set up to improve inner-city education. Weiss supported a school in[West Philadelphia due to his undergraduate years at the nearby University of Pennsylvania.

Unknown to Weiss, when the principal of Belmont Elementary heard of the offer, she instructed her teachers to socially promote every student they possibly could into the class that receiving Weiss' gift, giving it higher than normal proportion of learning disabled students at nearly 40%.

Twenty of the participants graduated from college but forty-five did not finish high school. In addition, twenty were convicted of crimes, and more than half of the girls had babies by the time they were eighteen years old.

== Legacy ==
Linguist John McWhorter called the project a failure due to not considering cultural differences between the project's founders and the community they attempted to serve.

Weiss reflected on the program in 2017, its thirty year anniversary, saying "I expected them all to get straight A's. I expected them all to go to Penn. And I realized that wasn't reality".
