= Fifth Street Asset Management =

Fifth Street Asset Management Inc.
- Type: Public
- Traded as: Nasdaq: FSAM
- Industry: Asset management
- Founded: 1998; 28 years ago
- Founder: Leonard M. Tannenbaum
- Headquarters: Greenwich, Connecticut, United States
- Key people: Leonard M. Tannenbaum (CEO)
- AUM: ▲US$5.3 billion (Q1, 2015); US$4.4 billion (Q1, 2014)
- Number of employees: 97
- Website: fifthstreetfinance.com

Fifth Street Asset Management Inc. was an SEC-registered American credit-focused asset manager. The firm lent to small and medium-sized businesses. Revenues of these businesses is generally between $25 million and $500 million.

In October 2017, Oaktree Capital Management assumed management of Fifth Street's two publicly traded business development companies.

Fifth Street had principal offices in Greenwich, Silicon Valley, Dallas, and Chicago.

The firm had over $6 billion of assets under management across two public Business Development Companies (BDCs), Fifth Street Finance Corp., Fifth Street Senior Floating Rate Corp. as well as multiple private investment vehicles. The stock of Fifth Street Finance Corp. is publicly traded on the NASDAQ under the ticker FSC. Fifth Street has over 100 professionals on their team. Senior management and board members own ~1.5% of Fifth Street Finance Corp.’s stock and ~6.0% of Fifth Street Senior Floating Rate Corp.’s stock.

== History ==
The Fifth Street entities were founded by Leonard M. Tannenbaum in 1998.

Fifth Street Asset Management owned two publicly traded business development companies, Fifth Street Finance Corporation and Fifth Street Floating Rate Corporation. Fifth Street Finance Corporation was founded in 1998 and launched its IPO in 2008 and Fifth Street Senior Floating Rate Corporation was established in 2013.

In 2014, Fifth Street Finance partnered with the Kemper Corporation on two joint ventures, which allow lenders to take on and re-distribute more debt, for $200 million in equity commitments and $400 million in leverage. Other firms that have entered into these agreements include Solar Capital and THL Credit. Fifth Street Asset Management also has two senior loan funds on its books.

In the summer of 2014 they made decisions that caused their investors to lose their investment value. In July 2014 they issued new shares to grow their balance sheet, but set these shares at a new price and that, after fees, diluted the wealth of existing shareholders. In August 2014 Fifth Street Floating Rate Corp a business development company, managed by the same manager as Fifth Street Finance Corp. issued millions of new shares at a price of $12.14, a 20% discount to the previously reported net asset value per share of $15.13. This led to shareholders losing millions of dollars.

In October 2014, Fifth Street Asset Management completed its initial public offering and is currently listed on the NASDAQ(NASDAQ: FSAM). The company had initially withdrawn its initial public offering, only to then amend it on October 28 and reduce the initial offering by 50 percent. Originally, the company planned to issue 8 million shares at between $24 and $26 per share. Company shares declined 21 percent to $13.37 on its first day of trading after opening at $17 per share.

Total revenues increased by 4.6%, or $1.1 million, to $24.9 million for the quarter ended March 31, 2015, as compared to $23.8 million for the quarter ended March 31, 2014. The growth in total revenues was driven by a 22.4% increase in year-over-year fee-earning AUM. Management fees (which include base management fees and Part I fees) for the quarter ended March 31, 2015 were $23.6 million, or 94.8% of total revenues.

On July 14, 2017, Oaktree Capital Management announced it would assume management of Fifth Street's two business development companies, Fifth Street Finance Corp and Fifth Street Senior Floating Rate Corp. Oaktree renamed the two funds Oaktree Specialty Lending Corp and Oaktree Strategic Income Corp, respectively. The transaction closed on October 17, 2017.

== Recognitions ==
Fifth Street Finance Corp. has received an investment grade rating from Standard & Poor's and ranks among the top Business Development Companies based on its market capitalization. Fifth Street received the 2014 ACG New York Champion's Award for "Senior Lender Firm of the Year" and was named in 2013 the Mergers & Acquisitions M&A Mid-Market Lender of the Year.

== Local involvement ==
Fifth Street Asset Management, together with GE, Ernst & Young, KPMG and UBS help sponsor the Junior Achievement program for young Connecticut entrepreneurs.
