= Ernst Kamnitzer =

Ernst Kamnitzer (20 December 1885 – 10 October 1946) was a German dramatist, publisher, and jurist.

== Works (selected) ==
- Der einsame Weg. (The Only Way) Comedy. Haupt & Hammon, Leipzig 1909.
- Der gestohlene Tod. (The Stolen Death) Haupt & Hammon, Leipzig 1909.
- Die Nadel (The Needle). Comedy in 3 acts following a draft by Carl Sternheim. S. Fischer, Berlin 1915.
- Aiaia: Spiel in 3 Akten. Nierendorf, Berlin 1928.

== Publisher ==
- Silvio Pellico: Mein Leben in Gefängnissen. (My Life in Prison) Theatiner-Verlag, München 1924.
- With Hermann Bahr: Die Werke von Alessandro Manzoni. (The Works of Alessandro Manzoni) 12 Bde. Theatiner-Verlag, München 1923 ff.
- Novalis: Sämtliche Werke. 4 Bde. Rösl & Cie., München 1923 f.
- Novalis: Fragmente. W. Jess, Dresden 1928.
- Der Londoner verlorene Sohn, translation of The London Prodigal by Ludwig Tieck with the original attributed to Shakespeare. Edited by Kamnitzer. Bühnenvolksbundverlag, Berlin 1928.

== Literature ==
- Kamnitzer, Ernst, in: Salomon Wininger: Große jüdische National-Biographie. Band 7. Czernowitz 1936, S. 150.
- Kamnitzer, Ernst, in: Joseph Walk (Hrsg.): Kurzbiographien zur Geschichte der Juden 1918–1945. München: Saur 1988, ISBN 3-598-10477-4, S. 182.
