= Peter Kamnitzer =

- Born: May 13, 1921; Berlin, Germany
- Died: June 25, 1998 (aged 77); Los Angeles, California, U.S.
- Education: Columbia University; Harvard University
- Occupation: Architect
- Spouse: Marietta Kamnitzer
- Children: 2 sons

Peter Kamnitzer (1921–1998) was a German-born American architect. Born in Germany, he emigrated first to Israel and secondly to the United States, where he settled in Los Angeles, California. He was a professor of architecture at the University of California, Los Angeles (UCLA). With NASA and General Electric, he invented a graphic design tool used to predict what impact buildings would have on environments. He was a proponent of adding greenery and leisurely facilities to apartment complexes. He designed many residential buildings in Downtown Los Angeles, including public housing.

== Early life ==
Hans Peter Kamnitzer was born on May 13, 1921, in Berlin, Germany. He emigrated to Israel. By 1949, he emigrated to the United States. He received a master's degree in planning and housing from Columbia University in 1951, followed by a master's degree in architecture from Harvard University in 1955.

== Career ==
Kamnitzer started his career at the National Planning Department for the Government of Israel. He subsequently worked for El Salvador's National Medical Center, followed by the United Nations Housing Section.

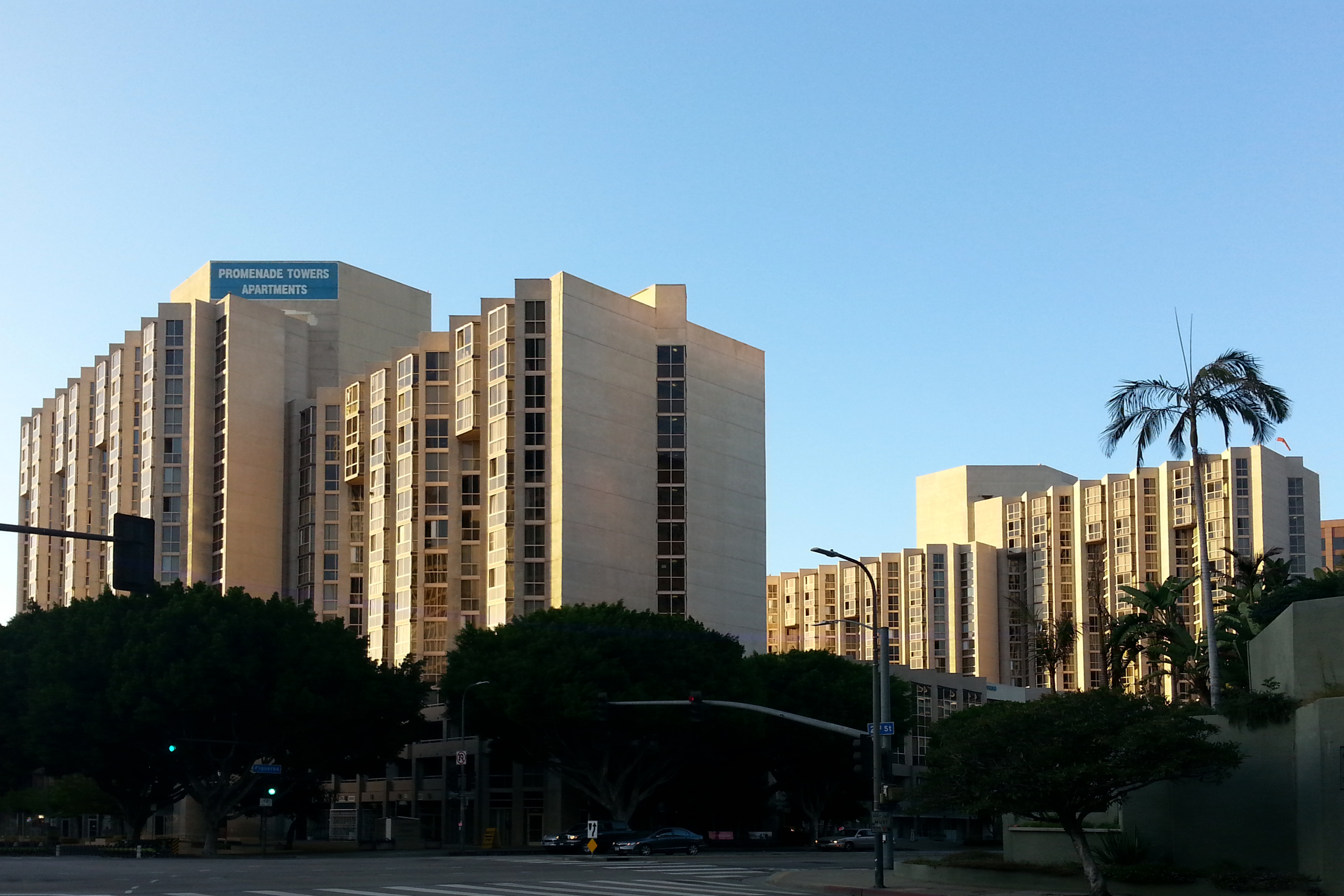
Promenade Towers in Bunker Hill, Los Angeles, California.

Kamnitzer became an architect in Los Angeles, California, where he first worked for Gruen Associates. During that time, he designed Wilshire Terrace, a residential building on Wilshire Boulevardin Westwood. Shortly after, he co-founded the architectural firm Kamnitzer, Marks & Partners, later known as Kamnitzer & Cotton, and Kamnitzer Cotton Vreeland. He designed many high-rise residential buildings in Downtown Los Angeles, including housing projects. He designed Promenade Towers in Bunker Hill, Los Angeles(1985). He also designed the Keck Theater on the campus of Occidental College(1989). His other projects included the Esplanade Apartments, located in Sherman Oaks, California. (1967), Mariners Village Apartments, in the Marina Del Rey (1968), The Meadows Apartments in Culver City (1969), The Promenade Plaza in Bunker Hill Los Angeles, (1981), the Promenade West in Bunker Hill, Los Angeles. (1982) Barnard Park Senior Housing, in Santa Monica (1984), Vista Montoya in Pico Union (1984), and the Grand Promenade in Bunker Hill Los Angeles (1986),

In a speech he gave to the National Association of Home Builders International Conference of Apartment Developers in 1970, Kamnitzer called for the development of full living environments, by building apartment complexes with retail facilities, tennis courts, swimming pools, childcare centers, and even park-like features like "rushing waterfalls, secluded walkways, meandering streams and lush greenery".

Additionally, Kamnitzer was a professor of architecture at the UCLA School of the Arts and Architecture, then the Perloff Hall School of Architecture and Urban Planning, from 1965 to his death. He was also a visiting professor at the University of Southern California. He also worked for NASA in the later 1960s. which resulted in the experiential film "Cityscape" (1968). By 1970, with NASA and General Electric, he had developed a graphic design tool to anticipate the effects of planned buildings. This resulted in the experimental film "Intuval" (1970).

In 1987, a garage in a project under construction in La Jolla, collapsed, which resulted in a lawsuit against Kamnitzer's firm, which lost a huge sum of money in the process, resulting in Kamnitzer closing down his firm. He struggled, working for different architectural firms without much success.

== Personal life and death ==
Kamnitzer's brother Heinz,(1917-2001), was a marxist politician living in Berlin.

Kamnitzer had a wife, Marietta, whom he was married from 1951 till his passing. They had two sons, David and Jordan. He died on June 25, 1998, resulting from a massive heart attack. His ashes are interred at the urn garden of Hillside Memorial Park in Culver City, next to the Heather Condominiums project (1970), and the Meadows Apartments, which were both designed by Kamnitzer, Marks, and Partners.
