= Sol B. Kest =

American real estate developer and philanthropist

- Born: March 10, 1922
- Died: June 21, 2010 (aged 88)
- Occupation(s): Real estate developer, philanthropist
- Spouse: Clara Kest
- Children: 3 sons, 1 daughter

Sol B. Kest (1922–2010) was an American real estate developer and philanthropist. He was the co-founder of Goldrich & Kest Industries, a real estate development company, and built many residential buildings in Los Angeles County, California. A Holocaust survivor, he supported Jewish causes in California and endowed a professorship at the Icahn School of Medicine at Mount Sinai.

== Early life ==
Sol B. Kest was born on March 10, 1922. During World War II, he was "the only one of nine children in his family to survive concentration camp incarceration".

== Career ==
Kest emigrated to the United States, where he worked on construction sites. With Jona Goldrich, another Holocaust survivor, Kest co-founded Goldrich & Kest Industries, a real estate development company based in Los Angeles, California in 1959.

In 1964, Kest and Goldrich developed Eldorado, a residential building located at 4425 Ventura Canyon Avenue in Sherman Oaks. They also developed Sutton Terrance, another residential building located at 6251 Coldwater Canyon Avenue in North Hollywood. Another apartment complex they developed, Sepulveda Village in Mission Hills, comprised 18 buildings, with the reception located at 10023 Sepulveda Boulevard. A year later, in 1965, they developed Northridge Village Townhouses, an apartment complex in Northridge, California.

In 1981, Kest and Goldrich purchased hotels in Tenderloin, San Francisco.

With Sheldon Appel, Goldrich and Kest redeveloped the former General Motors plant in South Gate in the 1980s. Meanwhile, they also turned land near the Long Beach Airport into offices and retail spaces.

With Nathan Shapell, Goldrich and Kest developed some buildings in the Bunker Hill area of Downtown Los Angeles, including Promenade Towers, Grand Promenade and the California Plaza. Moreover, they owned Kings Villages, a low-income housing project in Pasadena which they later sold to Thomas Pottmeyer. Additionally, they owned Green Hotel, a retirement home also located in Pasadena, and a government-subsidized retirement home in Santa Monica.

== Philanthropy ==
Kest supported synagogues in Los Angeles. In 1993, he testified on behalf of Rabbi Abraham Low of Congregation Mogen Abraham, an ultra-Orthodox synagogue in the Fairfax District who was charged with money-laundering.

Kest endowed the Clara and Sol Professorship and Chair of the Department of Dermatology at the Icahn School of Medicine at Mount Sinai, currently held by Professor Mark G. Lebwohl.

== Personal life and death ==
With his wife Clara, Kest had three sons, Michael Kest, Benny Kest, and Ezra Kest and a daughter, Francesca married to Ivan Berkowitz. He died on June 21, 2010.
