= Vera Guerin =

American billionaire, philanthropist and musical theater producer

- Born: Vera Shapell; 1947 (age 78–79)
- Occupation: philanthropist
- Spouse: Paul Guerin
- Children: Lisa Guerin; Dana Guerin; Michael Guerin
- Parent(s): Nathan Shapell; Lilly Schreiber

Vera Guerin is an American billionaire, philanthropist, and musical theater producer.

== Biography ==
Guerin was born to a Jewish family, the daughter of Lily (née Schreiber) and Nathan Shapell. Her father was born in Poland. During World War II he was interned at the Auschwitz and Buchenwald concentration camps but he managed to escape. Her mother was also an Auschwitz survivor and worked as an interpreter at several of the war crimes trials. Her parents immigrated to California in 1952 when she was five where her father co-founded home builder Shapell Industries with his brother David and brother-in-law Max Webb. Shapell Industries eventually went on to build 65,000 houses in California.

Guerin inherited her father's 43 percent stake in Shapell Industries upon his death in 2007. In November 2013, Toll Brothers purchased the Shapell Homes housebuilding division of Shapell Industries for $1.6 billion; Shapell's share was $690 million. Shapell still retains a 43 percent interest in the remainder of Shappell industries which includes over 10,000 apartments, five shopping centers, and four office buildings worth an additional $1.7 billion making her share worth $645 million. This sum combined with the amount earned from the Shapell Homes sale gives her an estimated net worth of $1.3 billion.

Guerin is an occasional musical theater producer. She produced a show for the Women's Guild 50th Anniversary Gala emceed by Billy Crystal. She produced the musical Leap of Faith.

== Philanthropy ==
In 2008, Guerin donated $5 million to support the research arm of the Women's Guild Lung Institute at Cedars-Sinai Medical Center. In 2013, Guerin donated $10 million to establish the Vera and Paul Guerin Family Congenital Heart Program at the Cedars-Sinai Medical Center Heart Institute; and $10 million to endow two academic chairs in pulmonary medicine and pediatric neurosurgery and to support Cedars-Sinai's new outpatient services building. Guerin serves as vice chair and chair-elect of the Cedars-Sinai Board of Directors and is a former president of the Women's Guild Lung Institute. She served as trustee at the Harvard-Westlake School; served on the Stephen S. Wise Temple advisory board; and served on the board of the Skirball Cultural Center in Los Angeles. Her husband is president and board chairman of Friends of the Israel Defense Forces, a support group for Israel's soldiers. In 2021 Guerin Donated $100 million to support Children's Health Services at Cedars Sinai

== Personal life ==
In 1968, Guerin married a gentile, Paul Guerin, over her parents' objections. He converted to Judaism. They have three children: Lisa, Dana, and Michael.
