= Max Webb =

Polish-born American real estate developer and philanthropist

- Born: March 2, 1917; Łódź, Poland
- Died: October 23, 2018 (aged 101); Los Angeles, California, U.S.
- Occupations: Real estate developer, philanthropist
- Spouses: Sala Shapell; Anna Hitter
- Children: Chara Webb; Rose Webb
- Relatives: Nathan Shapell (brother-in-law); David Shapell (brother-in-law)

Max Webb (March 2, 1917 – October 23, 2018) was a Polish-born American real estate developer and philanthropist from Los Angeles, California. A Holocaust survivor born to a Jewish family, he was the co-founder of one of the largest real estate development companies in Southern California. He supported charitable causes in the United States and Israel.

== Early life ==
Webb was born on March 2, 1917, in Łódź, Poland, to a Jewish family. He was one of seven children and had a twin sister. Collectively, he had five sisters and one brother. He grew up in a poor family and stopped going to school at an early age to take odd jobs and support family needs.

During World War II, he was deported to the Auschwitz concentration camp in 1943. It was there that he met his future brother-in-law, Nathan Shapell. Webb also survived the Death March 1944, as well as twelve labor camps and six concentration camps. However, both his parents as well as four of his sisters were murdered by the Nazis. Webb was liberated on May 8, 1945.

== Career ==
Shortly after his liberation, Webb moved to Münchberg with Nathan Shapell, where they established a textile business. In 1951, he stayed on Coney Island for ten months to get a visa for the United States. By 1952, he moved to Los Angeles with his wife and brother-in-law, and started a career in real estate development.

Webb established a real estate development company with his two brothers-in-law, Nathan and David Shapell. It was first known as S&S Construction, later Shapell Industries, followed by Shapell & Webb. In 1971, they moved into an office on the corner of Wilshire Boulevard and San Vicente Boulevard. After his brothers-in-law died, he retained the office. The company became one of the largest real estate development companies in Southern California.

== Philanthropy ==
Webb made charitable contributions to the Cedars-Sinai Medical Center in Los Angeles. He was a founding donor of the United States Holocaust Memorial Museum in Washington, D.C. He endowed a chair for David Wolpe, the Senior Rabbi of Sinai Temple. In December 2007, he purchased a plot of land on Pico Boulevard to erect a building home to two Jewish organizations in Los Angeles, IKAR and the Progressive Jewish Alliance (PJA).

With his second wife Anna, Webb endowed the Max Webb Family School of Languages Building and the Anna and Max Webb Chair for Visiting Scholars in Yiddish at Tel Aviv University. They are the recipients of honorary doctorates from Tel Aviv University and Bar Ilan University. Bar Ilan’s Psychology Building is also named after him, as well as a street in Giv'at Shmuel.

In 2013, Webb featured in a fundraising video for Tel Aviv University alongside other prominent Jewish philanthropists from Los Angeles Guilford Glazer, Jona Goldrich and Izak Parviz Nazarian.

== Personal life ==
Webb was married twice. He first married Sara Shapell in 1946. They had two daughters, Chara and Rose. After his first wife died, he married Anna Hitter, a businesswoman, in 1993.

Webb was a member of Sinai Temple, a Conservative synagogue in Los Angeles. He attended services at Congregation Beth Israel on Beverly Boulevard.

Having turned 100 in March 2017, Webb died at Cedars-Sinai Medical Center in Los Angeles, California, on October 23, 2018. He was 101.
