= Nathan Shapell =

Polish-born American survivor of The Holocaust, real estate developer and philanthropist

- Born: Nathan Schapelski; March 7, 1922; Poland
- Died: March 11, 2007 (aged 85); Beverly Hills, California, U.S.
- Resting place: Hillside Memorial Park Cemetery
- Occupations: Real Estate developer, philanthropist
- Known for: Co-founder of Shapell Industries
- Spouse: Lilly Schreiber
- Children: Vera Shapell Guerin
- Relatives: David Shapell (brother); Sala Shapell (sister); Max Webb (brother-in-law); Paul Guerin (son-in-law)

Nathan Shapell (March 7, 1922 – March 11, 2007) was a Polish-born American survivor of the Holocaust, as well as a real estate developer whose Shapell Industries was one of the largest real estate companies in California; he was also a philanthropist.

== Early life and education ==
Nathan Schapelski was born on March 7, 1922, in Poland. He was a teenager during Nazi Germany's Invasion of Poland. His mother was deported to the Targowa ghetto. He was deported to the Buchenwald and Auschwitz concentration camps, and managed to escape the latter. After the war, he built housing for homeless Jews in Münchberg, Germany.

== Career ==
Shapell moved to Los Angeles, California, with his wife in 1952, after reading about it in Life magazine, and they decided to stay. By 1955, together with his brother David and brother-in-law Max Webb, he co-founded Shapell Industries, a real estate development company. He served as its chairman and chief executive officer. The company's first large development was El Dorado Park Estates in Long Beach, California.

Shapell developed the MGM ranch in Thousand Oaks, California, the residential community of Kite Hill in Laguna Niguel, California, the East Lake development in Yorba Linda, and Promenade Towers, a 510-unit project in Downtown Los Angeles. In the late 1980s, he developed Porter Ranch, California, adding commercial buildings to the residential community.

With Jona Goldrich and Sol B. Kest, Shapell developed some buildings in the Bunker Hill area of Downtown Los Angeles, including Promenade Towers, Grand Promenade and the California Plaza.

From 1969 to 1984, Shapell Industries was publicly traded on the New York Stock Exchange and the Pacific Stock Exchange. He built over 65,000 houses in California.

== Philanthropy ==
Shapell served as a past president and Executive Board Member of the Academy of Achievement. He also served on the Little Hoover Commission from 1975 to 1994. He also founded and Co-Chaired Building a Better Los Angeles, which raised US$1 million for homeless people in Los Angeles. In 1980, he was Chairman of California's Task Force on Affordable Housing. In 1987, he became President of Drug Abuse Resistance Education, an anti-drug non-profit organization in the United States. He served on President Ronald Reagan's Private Sector Survey on Cost Control. In 1992, Governor Pete Wilson appointed him to the California Competitiveness Council to help boost the economy. In 1998, Senate President Pro-Tem Bill Lockyer appointed him to a commission to help alleviate California's overcrowding of prisons. He was one of the founders of the United States Holocaust Memorial Museum, and was appointed by President George H. W. Bush and reappointed twice by President Bill Clinton to its governing council.

Shapell donated to the Yad Vashem, Israel's official memorial to the Jewish victims of the Holocaust, the University of Santa Clara, the University of Southern California, as well as Tel Aviv University and Bar-Ilan University in Israel. He also supported the Cedars-Sinai Medical Center, the D.A.R.E. program, and the Vista Del Mar Child and Family Services. He received an Honorary Doctorate from the University of Santa Clara in 1986 and from Tel Aviv University in 1987. He was a strong supporter of Israel, and he traveled to the frontlines to show his support to the Israel Defense Forces during the Sinai War, the Six-Day War and the Yom Kippur War.

== Personal life ==
Shapell lived in Beverly Hills, California. He was married to Lilly Schreiber, who died in 1994. She was also an Auschwitz survivor and worked as an interpreter at several of the war crimes trials. They had a daughter, Vera Guerin. She married a gentile, Paul Guerin, over her father's objections. Vera inherited her father’s 43 percent stake in Shapell Industries.

== Death and legacy ==
Shapell died on March 11, 2007, and he was buried in the Hillside Memorial Park Cemetery, a Jewish cemetery in Culver City, California.

In November 2013, Toll Brothers purchased the Shapell Homes housebuilding division of Shapell Industries for $1.6 billion; his daughter Vera's share was $690 million. Vera still retains a 43 percent interest in the remainder of Shapell industries which includes over 10,000 apartments, five shopping centers, and four office buildings worth an additional $1.7 billion.

The Nathan Shapell Memorial Highway in Los Angeles, California, is named in his honor, along with a park in Yorba Linda and the football field of Yorba Linda High School.

== Bibliography ==
- Shapell, Nathan (1974). Witness to the Truth. New York: McKay. ISBN 9780679504566. OCLC 979043.
