= Education NGOs =

Non-profit organizations working in the field of education

An Education NGO, or Education Non-Governmental Organization, is an organization that focuses on educational initiatives and programs outside the realm of government or state-run education systems. These NGOs often work to provide educational access to students who may not have access to state education, advocate for government policies that promote education for all, offer non-formal education programs, and support small and rural schools. Education NGOs play a role in addressing educational disparities, promoting inclusive and equitable quality education, and advocating for lifelong learning opportunities for all individuals.

The UN Education and Scientific Council (UNESCO) stated “education for sustainable development is a broad task that calls for the full involvement of multiple educational organizations and groups in bureaucracies and civil societies. These include Non-Governmental Organizations or NGOs.

The language of education used by nation-states, as well as international intergovernmental organizations, non-governmental organizations (both transnational and national), and agents of civil society (many of which belong to the aforementioned categories), contributes heavily to the self-identification of individuals. NGOs can be defined as "formal organizations, and as such, they emerge when a group of people organizes themselves into a social unit that was established with the explicit objective of achieving certain ends and formulating rules to govern the relations among the members of the organization and the duties of each member" (Blau and Scott, 1970).

== Historical background ==
=== Influence of Education ===
An article published in The Nation, a Pakistan newspaper, on July 2, 2018, described education as crucial to the development of all individuals. Education nurtures a person's way of thinking, inculcates values, and teaches the skills needed to succeed in life. At the same time, it helps boost the social, economic, and political progress of nations. It said governments that establish an efficient education system reaps benefits in the long-term.

== The Role of NGOs, Non-State Actors, and Globalization in Education ==
=== Effects of Globalization on Education ===
Education is rapidly becoming essential to attaining social mobility and economic stability, especially in an increasingly globalized world where technical skills and knowledge are necessary to participate in the economy. Considering this reality, more educational institutions are seeking to incorporate more STEM courses and career training into their curriculums. However, these educational opportunities are not widely offered, which many scholars have argued has led to greater global inequality.

Globalization has also generated a greater push for common, global educational standards such as the United Nations' Millennium Development Goals and Sustainable Development Goals. Yet, some critics argue that these standards pushes a Westernized concept of quality education and focuses on economic benefits rather than the goals of sustainable development and global equality.

Where education has been the role of the nation-state, globalization has created new institutions including global regulatory organizations, global mass media and the aforementioned global flow of populations, which have contributed to the weakening of the nation-state in education. Global regulatory organizations include the intergovernmental organizations, such as membership organizations like the World Bank and World Trade Organization that regulate the world economy, as well as other international organizations such as the United Nations. These organizations operate within a context of global norms that are established, and laws that are passed, with the influence of non-state actors, or non-governmental organizations. While global regulatory organizations focus on the establishment and enforcement of policies by exerting influence over the conditions of monetary loans, NGOs attempt to establish and enforce norms through exerting a certain sense of moral authority.

The governments of some African countries do not fully welcome the idea of NGO contributions towards education; thus such governments tend to be constantly involved with activities of NGOs in the education sector. However, governments regulate the activities of NGO's based on their economic standing, "administrative standing" and "historical relationship" with NGO's. Instead of direct funding, government relationship between with NGOs and non state actors in education is focused on promotion of non state actors.

=== Millennium Development Goals ===
In 2000, the United Nations formed the Millennium Development Goals (MDGs) - eight goals that sought to address global poverty, educational disparities, gender inequality, and health crises. The 191 member states of the UN committed to achieving the Millennium Development Goals (MDGs) by 2015.

Goal 2 specifically focused on providing "universal primary education," for children in every nation. The UN Education and Scientific Council (UNESCO) determined primary education to be "the beginning of systematic apprenticeship of reading, writing, and mathematics." In order to measure the progress towards achieving Goal 2, UNESCO utilized three gauges; the literacy rate of the 15 - 24 year old demographic, the net total enrollment in the primary education system and the number of students who start first grade and reach the fifth grade.

In a 2003 Education for All report, data revealed that the progress towards Goal 2 in Sub-Saharan Africa had been unsuccessful. The report disclosed that 58% of students in the area were enrolled in a primary school and that there was a 15% rate of repeating school grades in half of the countries within the region. However, research also indicates that the MDGs were in fact attained if measured on the overall, global scale. The rate of children of primary school age not receiving an education was reduced from 100 million to 57 million between the years 2000 to 2015 During this same period of time, the global literacy rate of people between 15 and 24 years old increased from 83% to 91%.

=== Sustainable Development Goals ===
In 2016, the United Nations enacted the Sustainable Development Goals (SDGs) - a set of 17 global goals to be accomplished by 2030. Through Goal 4 (SDG 4), the United Nations seeks to "ensure inclusive and equitable quality education and promote lifelong learning opportunities for all."

As of 2017, the UN reported that despite that more children in the world are attending school than ever before, millions of children still do not meet standard levels in math and reading. According to the current reports, less than half of students in 9 out of 24 sub-Saharan African nations and 6 of 15 Latin American countries had achieved proficient standards in math by the time they finished primary school. Additionally less than half of the children in a quarter of sub-Saharan African countries, who completed a primary education had reached proficient, reading standards. Due to the low achievement rates in these areas, the UN stressed that efforts in educational attainment must be increased in sub-Saharan Africa and Southern Asia as well as "for vulnerable populations, including persons with disabilities, indigenous people, refugee children and poor children in rural areas." The UN claimed that the main factors that have contributed to these disparities were the deficient states of schools in developing areas, inadequate training for teachers and the lack of access to electricity and potable water in a majority of schools in the regions. To address these issues, in 2015, nations of the UN contributed $1 billion to the official development assistance (ODA) for scholarships.

The table below provides some historic and modern roles of NGOs in education:

Role of NGOs in Education
Historic roles of NGOs in Education:
Spread of western education, led by religious organizations in late 19th and early 20th centuries
Played a key role in the inclusion of education development in international organization projects after the second world war
- Development of education initiatives, outside state actors (1950s and 70s)
More recent roles of NGOs in Education:
- Provision of educational access to students without access to public/government education
- Advocacy for government to provide access to education for all
- Provision of non-formal education
- Provision of support for small and rural schools

Actors in education that operate outside and across national boundaries are categorized as members of a global community. Although this does not greatly distinguish between international/transnational actors, other scholars have developed the term global civil society, including a network of NGOs that function in contrast to and sometimes competing with, the actions of nation-states. "The emergence and growth of Civil Society over the past two decades have been one of the most significant trends in international development. The World Bank recognizes that civil society plays an especially critical role in helping to amplify the voices of the poorest people in the decisions that affect their lives, improve development effectiveness and sustainability, and hold governments and policymakers publicly accountable. The purpose of this web site is to provide Civil Service Organizations (CSOs) with information, links, and materials on the World Bank's evolving relationship with civil society in Washington and throughout the world". Furthermore, the World Bank is the single largest external financier of education in the world, with "Education...at the heart of the World Bank's mission to reduce global poverty" (according to their own reports). The World Bank also adopts educational standards established by other international intergovernmental organizations, such as their implementation of the Organization for Economic Cooperation and Development (OECD)'s "Educational Sector Strategy", which establishes specific international targets for "primary education, adult literacy, and gender parity in basic education with the Education for All initiative" as well as the OECD's Development Assistance Committee goals".

Although many scholars, activists, and NGOs agree with targeting specific populations, they contest the motives of the World Bank based on their measurements of success. These members of civil society see the actions of the World Bank as emphasizing economic growth based on the pursuit of profits as well as the increase of consumption in developing areas, as favoring representative governments, and as supporting the privatization of educational systems (including private schools, charging tuition for government schools, and privatizing textbook production). Critics, such as members of the antiglobalization movement, have argued that the economic and environmental growth policies of the World Bank actually hinder educational development in many countries, and are, in fact, undemocratic based on the perpetuation of inequality.

The "U.S. Network for Global Economic Justice", an antiglobalization platform, called for "the immediate suspension of the policies and practices of the International Monetary Fund (IMF) and World Bank Group which have caused widespread poverty, inequality, and suffering among the world's peoples and damage to the world's environment. . . These institutions are anti-democratic... and their policies have benefitted international private sector financiers, transnational corporations, and corrupt officials and politicians. . . We demand that the World Bank Group immediately cease providing advice and resources to advance the goals associated with corporate globalization, such as privatization and liberalization". These critics believe that the type of education that is promoted by international institutions and intergovernmental monetary institutions such as the IMF and World Bank represent the interest of the member countries, and do not benefit the human capital within the recipient countries. This is an example of policy implementation from above.

On the other hand, members of civil society and the antiglobalization movements alike view their own actions as policy implementation from below, emphasizing "relations among people and between people and the environment", as opposed to privatization of government services, and as focusing on the direct action and participation of citizens in decision-making. Because of this, education has shifted from nation-state oriented learning to an emphasis on world citizenship, civic education, service learning, human rights, and environmental education.

=== Impact of World Citizenship on NGOs ===
Globalization has had positive benefits on the concepts of global/world citizenship and civic society. The adoption of the concept of a global society, by educators, has led to a growth in the non-governmental (NGO) and non-profit sector. The idea of a global citizen arose with the following characteristics:

- Global Citizens know about and have contact with NGOs
- Global citizens' education orients them towards participation in NGOs
- Global Citizens are people with higher education and they have the financial resources to travel
- World citizenship is more probable for people involved in social service activities and voluntary work
- World citizenship is more probable for people with a weak national identity

World citizenship has exploded because of recent advances in new information technologies such as the internet and its social networking sites; these provide "powerful, new opportunities to advocates to disseminate information and mobilize support". The increase in population movements and a surge in travel to world conferences (i.e. 1992 Rio Earth Summit, 1995 Beijing UN Conference on Women) has helped the operationalist relations between NGOs, further solidifying transnational networks of communication and influence.

== United States Education Nonprofits ==
=== United States Public Policy ===
Edward M. Kennedy Serve America Act of 2009

- Reauthorizes and expands two previous acts, the National and Community Service Act of 1990 (NCSA) and the Domestic Volunteer Service Act of 1973 (DVSA).
  - The National and Community Service Act of 1990 describes service learning as "a method under which students or participants learn and develop through active participation in thoughtfully organized service that is conducted in and meets the needs of a community; is coordinated with an elementary school, secondary school, institution of higher education, or community service program, and with the community; and helps foster civic responsibility; and that is integrated into and enhances the academic curriculum of the students or the educational components of the community service program in which the participants are enrolled; and provides structured time for the students or participants to reflect on the service experience."

Nonprofit Capacity Building Program

- "The Nonprofit Capacity Building Program (NCBP) will increase the capacity of a small number of intermediary grantees to work with small and midsize nonprofits in communities facing resource hardship challenges to develop and implement performance management systems".

=== Main Concerns with the U.S Education System ===
Many education nonprofits and programs in the United States seek to address the growing, academic disparities between racial and socioeconomic groups. In the U.S., exam scores of poor students, who are often Latino or black, are lower than those of white, middle-class students. Students who attend schools with 50% or more children in poverty greater concentration are more likely to fall below the U.S. standards in mathematics and reading. Not only that, but as access to higher education becomes increasingly crucial to earning a stable income, it has also become more costly in the nation. This issue has exacerbated the problem of equal access to college, as the typical black or Latino family do not possess a tenth of the wealth of the typical white family.

The academic disparities in the United States are also caused by other factors. One is that qualified, effective teachers are often concentrated in school districts that offer higher salaries Yet these districts are inhabited mainly by wealthier families and less by students of color. Another cause is that impoverished circumstances prevent children from learning in school, increasing the achievement gap. Studies have also revealed that the trend of school choice is a hindrance to social mobility, as more affluent families have access to schools with greater resources that are often private. This tendency has generated greater school segregation not only amongst students of various races but also of different socioeconomic classes.

=== General Goals of Education NGOs in the United States ===
Education nonprofit organizations generally aim to achieve the following goals that address the main concerns with the U.S. education system:

- Bridge national, achievement gap
- Provide supplemental, educational resources to students
- Provide mentors for them outside of the classroom
- Help combat cycle of poverty

== Human Rights ==
Human rights NGOs, the largest group of NGOs in global civil society, shift focus away from an allegiance to the nation-state, as proposed by Rousseau, to allegiance to humanity. The 1995 Report of the United Nations Office of the High Commissioner for Human Rights stressed the training, dissemination, and information efforts aimed at the building of a universal culture of human rights...through the imparting of knowledge and skills and the molding of attitudes and directed to: a)The strengthening of respect for human rights and fundamental freedoms; b)The full development of the human personality and the sense of its dignity; c) The promotion of understanding, tolerance, gender equality and friendship among all nations, indigenous peoples, and racial, national, ethnic religious and linguistic groups; d)The enabling of all persons to participate effectively in a free society; e)The furtherance of the activities of the United Nations for the maintenance of peace". However, this report fails to address socio-economic inequalities, and is more ideological.

Teaches about:

- Advocating for the rights of marginalized and vulnerable groups, such as women, children, refugees, and ethnic minorities.
- Raising awareness about human rights abuses, including violations of civil, political, economic, social, and cultural rights.
- Holding governments and institutions accountable for human rights violations and pushing for legal and policy reforms to address systemic issues.
- Providing support and services to victims of human rights abuses, such as legal assistance, counseling, and rehabilitation.
- Promoting human rights education and awareness among the general public, including through training programs, workshops, and advocacy campaigns.

In summary, human rights NGOs play a crucial role in protecting and promoting human rights, and they work to ensure that everyone is able to live with dignity, freedom, and equality.

== Prominent Education Nonprofit Institutions ==
=== Active Intergovernmental Institutions ===
- The World Bank (WB)
- Organization for Economic Cooperation and Development (OECD)
- World Trade Organization (WTO)
- United Nations (UN)
- Educational, Scientific, and Cultural Organization (UNESCO)
- United Nations Children's Fund (UNICEF)
- Office of the High Commissioner for Human Rights (OHCHR)
- United Nations High Commissioner for Refugees (UNHCR)

=== Active Non-Governmental Organizations ===
- Education
- Khan Academy
- CK-12
- Stand for Children
- Teach for America
- Education For All
