= The Wild Hunt (periodical) =

Pagan news outlet

- We don't stir the cauldron, we cover it.
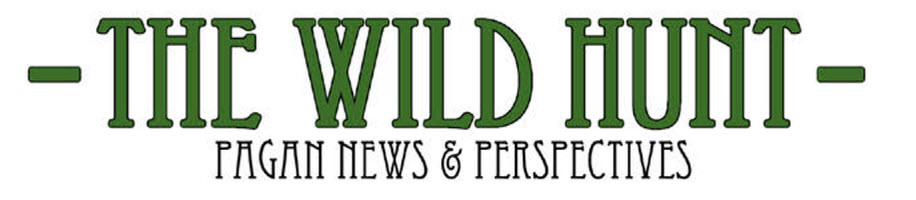
- Type: Daily News
- Founder: Jason Pitzl
- Editor-in-chief: Manny Tejeda y Moreno
- News editor: Manny Tejeda y Moreno
- Opinion editor: Eric O. Scott
- Industry: Religion and Spirituality
- Founded: 2004
- Language: English, Spanish
- Headquarters: Miami, Florida
- Website: www.wildhunt.org

The Wild Hunt is a nonprofit online pagan news outlet. Created as a blog by Jason Pitzl-Waters in 2004, it was edited by Heather Greene from 2014-2018 and subsequently by Manny Tejeda y Moreno. In 2007 it had 182,100 unique visitors. In 2016 it had ten regular writers and three columnists.

Articles from The Wild Hunt have been cited in a number of mainstream media outlets and scholarly publications.

== History ==
The Wild Hunt was founded in 2004 by Jason Pitzl. Pitzl was the sole writer for The Wild Hunt for its first seven years. In the summer of 2011, The Wild Hunt was recruited to Patheos, a central hub site that hosts blogs related to many religions.

The Wild Hunt eventually left Patheos returning to a stand-alone entity. In the fall of 2012, Pitzl brought on the first two weekly contributors and four monthly columnists. In 2014, Pitzl retired from his position. Heather Greene took over as managing editor and publisher.

With Greene's retirement from The Wild Hunt, Manny Moreno became Editor-in-Chief/Publisher in 2018.

American musician Matt Morris was a contributor before his return to Christianity.
