= Toll Brothers =

American home builder company

Toll Brothers, Inc.
- Type: Public
- Traded as: NYSE: TOL; S&P 400 component
- Industry: Home construction
- Founded: 1967; 59 years ago
- Founders: Robert I. Toll; Bruce E. Toll
- Headquarters: Fort Washington, Pennsylvania, U.S.
- Key people: Douglas C. Yearley, Jr., Chairman and Karl Mistry, CEO
- Production output: 10,813 new home deliveries (2024)
- Revenue: ▲US$10.8 billion (2024)
- Operating income: ▲US$2.04 billion (2024)
- Net income: ▲US$1.57 billion (2024)
- Total assets: ▲US$13.4 billion (2024)
- Total equity: ▲US$7.67 billion (2024)
- Number of employees: 4,900 (2024)
- Website: tollbrothers.com

Toll Brothers, Inc. is an American homebuilding company that builds, markets, and finances for residential and commercial properties in the United States. In 2020, the company was the fifth largest home builder in the United States, based on homebuilding revenue. The company is ranked 411th on the Fortune 500.

In 2021, the company sold homes at an average selling price of $844,400. Average prices ranged from $663,700 in the South region to $1,376,800 in the Pacific region.

== History ==
Toll Brothers was founded in 1967 in Pennsylvania by Robert I. Toll and Bruce E. Toll. Robert received a law degree from University of Pennsylvania and his B.A. from Cornell University, while his brother Bruce had an accounting degree from the University of Miami. Their father, Albert, built homes and the brothers believed that the new home industry had more to offer. Bruce was 26 and Robert was 27 at the time.

Toll Brothers was incorporated as a Delaware corporation with a public offering raising $40 million.

In addition to single-family, carriage house/townhouse and condominium residences, Toll Brothers offers rental apartments (Apartment Living division) and luxury student housing (Campus Living division). They also operate various ancillary businesses including mortgage, insurance, home automation/security, and landscaping.

== Finance ==
In Q1 2025, the company reported US $1.84 billion in revenue (down ~1.6%) and diluted EPS of $1.75, below analyst expectations. The shortfall was attributed to impairments and the delayed sale of a stabilized apartment property in a joint venture.

== Executives ==
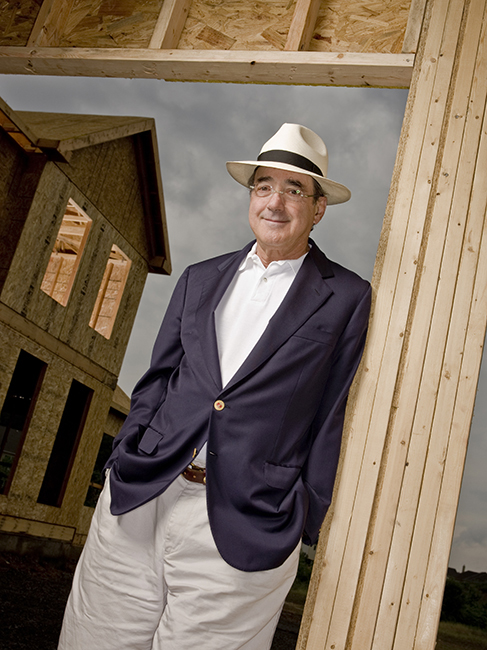
Robert Toll in 2008

Robert Toll stepped down as chairman in 2018 and served exclusively as special advisor to the company.

Douglas C. Yearley Jr. joined Toll Brothers in 1990 and was promoted as chief executive officer in June 2010 and currently holds the position of chairman and chief executive officer. Martin Connor was hired as chief financial officer in 2010.

Robert Parahus was promoted to chief operating officer and executive president in 2020.

== Acquisitions ==
Toll Brothers has made thirteen acquisitions since 1995:

- West Texas Woodlands
- Geoffrey H. Edmunds in Scottsdale, Arizona (1995)
- Coleman Homes' Las Vegas Division (1998)
- Silverman Homes in metro Detroit (1999)
- Richard R. Dostie (2003) and The Manhattan Building Company (2003) in northern New Jersey
- the central Florida Division of Landstar Homes (2005)
- CamWest Development in Seattle, Washington (2011)
- Shapell Industries in California (2014)
- Coleman Homes in Boise, Idaho (2016)
- Sharp Residential in Atlanta, Georgia (2019)
- Sabal Homes in South Carolina (2019)
- Thrive Residential in Nashville and Atlanta (2020)
- Keller Homes in Colorado Springs (2020)

== Disputes ==
Toll Brothers was sued in April 2007 by a group of investors claiming they were misled by directors about their ability to maintain historically high earnings during the downturn in the U.S. residential real estate market. Toll Brothers agreed to settle the suit for $25 million, though they did not admit any wrongdoing.

The Williamsburg Condo Market project gained notoriety in 2007 when a kettle of roofing tar on the top level caught fire during construction and although quickly contained produced a significant amount of smoke. After meeting with the residents Toll Brothers agreed to fix the seals. Toll Brothers sued the contractor who installed the windows for $10 million.

In 2012, the company was required to pay a penalty of $741,000 for numerous alleged violations of the Clean Water Act, including more than 600 relating to runoff of stormwater at its building sites, among them sites in the Chesapeake Bay Watershed. Toll Brothers agreed to implement storm-water training and prevention techniques across the entire company.

The Toll Brothers have also filed lawsuits over denial of building permits over concerns about traffic density, watershed and other concerns
