= MBH Architects =

Architecture firm based in California

- Industry: Architecture
- Founded: Alameda, California, USA (1989)
- Headquarters: Alameda, California, USA
- Area served: Worldwide
- Key people: Dennis Heath and John McNulty
- Number of employees: 240
- Website: mbharch.com

MBH Architects is an architecture and interior design firm founded in October 1989 by architects John McNulty and Dennis Heath. The firm is headquartered in a LEED Gold certified office in Alameda, California in the San Francisco Bay Area.

Examples of its work include the design of several P.F. Chang's China Bistros, work for the Hilton Grand Vacations Company, and the Sonoma Mountain Village Rohnert Park redevelopment.

== Overview ==
The company was founded in 1989 by architects John McNulty and Dennis Heath after they left Gensler. The company has specialized in retail, hospitality, and high-density residential design, and its list of clients includes Adidas, Estée Lauder, Kmart, Rite Aid, Starbucks, and Walgreens. Its first retail work was commissioned by Gap and by 2001 the company had designed some 300 Gap's Old Navy stores.

One of MBH's first sustainable projects was a 100,000+ square foot Target store, built in 1995, Fullerton, CA. It was labeled the United States Environmental Protection Agency Energy Star Showcase and Target's first "green" building for its use of skylights that cut the original energy consumption by 24% with a 5-year payback. Target was awarded a "Green Lights Partner/Ally of the Year Award" for this store.

In June 2000 the company paid a large fine to the Business Software Alliance for using a quantity of unlicensed software. In 2005 the company won the Structural Ingenuity category at the annual Canstruction event with a model of the Pantheon made from 3,648 tin cans. Members of staff have taken part in the Fortune Battle of the Corporate Bands with their amateur pop group named "The 4-Inch Studs" coming second in 2008.

Like many other companies involved with construction, MBH suffered in the late-2000s recession: its revenue fell by half which forced it to lay off 160 of its 220 employees, and in December 2008 City National Bank froze its line of credit and threatened to call in a $3 million loan. Today MBH employs over 150 staff who provide architectural services on commercial, hospitality, retail, multi-family housing, and restaurant projects.

Since 1995, the company has received many awards, most recently winning "Best Retail Project" and "Best Multi Family Housing Project-4 to 6 Stories Rental" at the PCBC Gold Nugget Awards in 2010. From 2005 to 2008 it was listed as one of the San Francisco Business Times "100 Best Places to Work in the Bay Area", and between 2000 and 2004 it won several awards for its restaurant designs for P. F. Chang's China Bistro.

In 2005, VM&SD Magazines listed MBH as number 9 in a list of the top 50 U.S. retail architectural firms. In March 2011, DDI Magazine included MBH at number 9 in a list of the top 20 North American retail design companies based on 2010 revenue for retail design services.

In 2017, MBH expanded its East Coast presence with the acquisition of New York-based Anderson Architects.

In 2018, MBH acquired Christiani Johnson Architects, a San Francisco-based architecture and interior design firm.

== Projects ==
=== Restaurants ===
MBH has designed and built over 330 restaurants. This work has included collaboration with Engstrom Design Group, Pat Kuleto, and JMA Ventures on two large waterfront restaurants, Epic Roasthouse and Waterbar, located near the Ferry Building in San Francisco. Other San Francisco restaurants include Momo's, Pedro's Cantina, 301, and Elroy's. The company has designed several P.F. Chang's China Bistros, receiving several awards for their designs.

=== Housing ===
MBH's housing portfolio consists of multi-family residential projects, including historical renovations, mixed-use, rowhouses, high rises, affordable housing, and senior housing. MBH has built over 2,225 units and designed more than 9,000 units.

MBH's rehabilitation projects include the Hathaway Warehouse in Rincon Hill, San Francisco. Built in the 1850s—perhaps as early as 1856—the Hathaway Warehouse is one of the oldest remaining warehouses in the city and is designated as a historically Significant Building. MBH's design kept most of the building's brick exterior, masonry, heavy timber framing, and granite foundations while juxtaposing them against modern material. The building is now known as Harbor Lofts and MBH received a Gold Nugget Award for Award of Merit, Adaptive Reuse in 1997 for the conversion.

The Coffin Reddington Building, also in Rincon Hill, was built in 1937 as an office building/warehouse. It is listed on the National Register of Historic Places. MBH received a Gold Nugget Award for converting the old building into 53 luxury lofts and two high-end restaurants on the ground floor.

In 2004, MBH won the Residential Architect Award and the 2003 Gold Nugget Award for the North Beach Malt House, an early 20th-century industrial concrete and steel building. MBH converted the inner structure to residential spaces but retained two of the original steel silos; the building's most prominent features. One silo is now used for a lobby/courtyard entry point and both are historical artifacts of the brewing process and preserve the building's history.

=== Retail ===
The Sony PlayStation store at the Sony Metreon Entertainment Complex in San Francisco, CA was conceived and designed as both a retail outlet for the PlayStation consoles and games and as an arcade with video kiosks and a circular bar of monitors open for all customers to play. The store design won MBH and its collaborator, New York design firm, Thinc Design several awards in 1999 and 2000.

=== Interiors ===
MBH worked with Gensler and Page & Turnbull at One Powell, an eight-story historical building at the intersection of Powell and Market Street in San Francisco. Originally built in 1921 by the Bank of Italy, the building had been solely occupied by that bank and its successor, Bank of America. The renovation, which was completed in 2005, included conversion of the upper floors into multi family house consisting of studio, one, and two bedroom units, for which MBH's Interior group led the design.

MBH planned the interior office space for the 7,500 square feet (700 m^{2}) headquarters of MetroRisk in South Beach, San Francisco. MBH also completed several space plans for the Union Bank of California and the redesign of the corporate headquarters of Bi-Rite Food Distributors. Most recently, MBH completed the tenant improvement for EPIC's new office in San Francisco.

=== Hospitality ===
MBH has been an executive architect and design architect for Hilton Worldwide and Marriott International. MBH has completed for Marriott: the Marriott Event Pavilion in Irvine, California; Newport Coast Villas in Newport Beach, California, which includes 600 timeshare units on 75 acres; and Marriott's Shadow Ridge in Palm Desert, California.

For Hilton, MBH created the hotel construction documents for the Paris Las Vegas casino/hotel in Las Vegas, and was one of the architects for two Las Vegas Hilton Grand Vacations Clubs: Las Vegas Hilton and Strip. Currently MBH is working on the seismic upgrade of the San Francisco Hilton in Union Square along with the renovation of the Grand Ballroom and Tower 3 guestrooms.

=== Commercial ===
MBH designed The San Francisco Fire Credit Union (SFFCU), which received a Gold Nugget award of merit in 2001 for Best Professional Building and completed Serramonte Corporate Center in Daly City, California in 2003, now home to Kaiser Permanente. MBH has also completed the Corporate Headquarters for Tucker Marks, P.F. Chang's China Bistro, The Good Tidings Foundation, Metro/Risk, Sitzman – Morris – Lavis, and Motorola Companies. In 2007 the company was a consultant for commercial architecture for the Sonoma Mountain Village Rohnert Park redevelopment.

=== Master planning ===
Some of the largest MBH projects have revolved around community, city, and public transit planning. These include a master planned community near Toledo, resort communities in Mont-Tremblant, Canada, and the Tustin Legacy Town Center in California. MBH designed transit-oriented developments in Fullerton, Dublin, and Solano, California, and the downtown and neighborhood revitalizations for Yucca Valley, CA. Completed planning projects include Levis Commons and the Dunes on Monterey Bay.

== Philanthropy ==
Giving back has been an integral part of MBH Architects’ culture since the firm opened its doors in 1989, when founding principals John McNulty and Dennis Heath committed to cultivating their relationship with On Lok Lifeways, a nonprofit that develops healthcare models for the elderly. Supporting a diverse array of causes, including arts education, sustainability, and ending HIV/AIDS, Alzheimer's, heart disease and homelessness, has solidified MBH's tradition of enhancing communities with socially minded projects and volunteer work. MBH has worked with Bay Area non-profit The Good Tidings Foundation on a variety of projects including the Foundation's past and current headquarters and multiple LeRoy Neiman Art Studios.

== See also ==
List of San Francisco Designated Landmarks
