= Elara =

Elara may refer to:

- Elara (mythology), mother of the giant Tityos in Greek mythology
- Elara (moon), a moon of Jupiter named after Elara
- Elara (timeshare), a building on the Las Vegas Strip in Las Vegas, Nevada, U.S.
- Ellalan, or Eḷāra, a member of the Tamil Chola dynasty and monarch of the Anuradhapura Kingdom
- "Elara", a song from the 2012 album Soundtrack for the Voices in My Head Vol. 02 by Celldweller
- Elara Pictures, an American film production company
- Chery A5, a Chinese compact sedan, sold in Ukraine as the Chery Elara

== See also ==
- Elarra, a character in the roleplay game Final Fantasy Record Keeper
