= Hilton Grand Vacations Club =

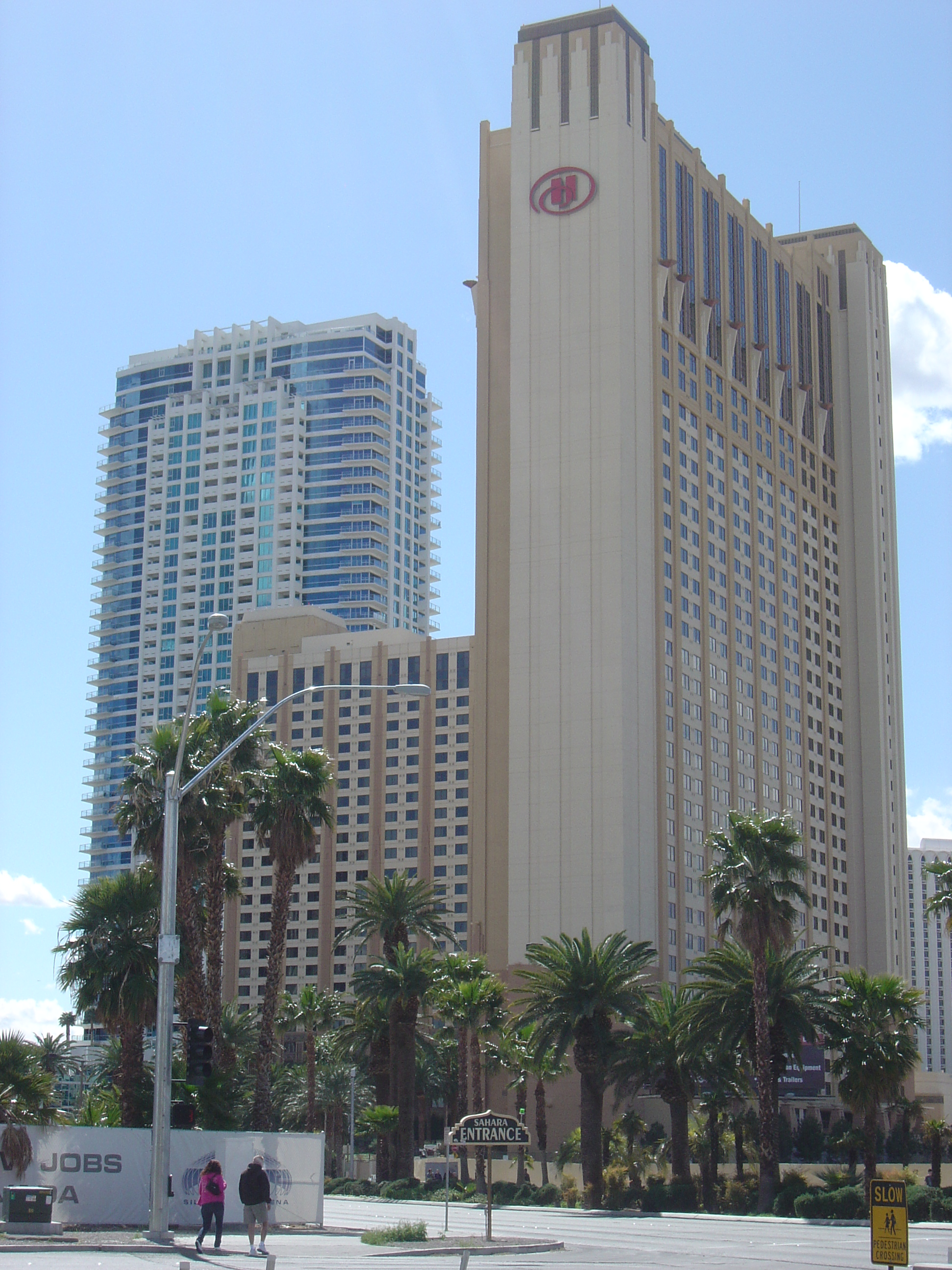
- Hilton's 38-story tower (right) and 28-story tower, with Sky Las Vegas in the background.
- Interactive map of the Hilton Grand Vacations Club area

General information
- Status: Completed
- Type: Timeshares
- Location: 2650 South Las Vegas Boulevard, Winchester, Nevada, United States
- Coordinates: 36.140165°N 115.161261°W
- Groundbreaking: June 14, 2001
- Opened: February 4, 2004

Technical details
- Floor count: 28 (first tower); 38 (second tower)

Design and construction
- Architecture firm: MBH Architects
- Developer: Hilton Grand Vacations Company
- Main contractor: Penta Building Group

Other information
- Number of units: 714

Website
- Official website

Hilton Grand Vacations Club is a timeshare property located on the northern end of the Las Vegas Strip in Winchester, Nevada. The property was previously occupied by the El Rancho Vegas hotel and casino from 1941 until 1960, when it burned down. The land remained vacant until 2001, when Hilton Grand Vacations purchased a portion of the property and began construction of a 28-story timeshare tower.

Construction was postponed after the September 11 attacks, as hotels owned by Hilton Hotels Corporation were financially suffering from a lack of tourism as a result of the attacks. Construction resumed in 2002, and the tower opened in February 2004. A second tower, standing 38 stories, began construction later that year and was completed in 2006.

== History ==
The property began in 1941 as the El Rancho Vegas hotel and casino, located at the southwest corner of South Las Vegas Boulevard and Sahara Avenue, an area that would ultimately become the northern end of the Las Vegas Strip. The El Rancho Vegas burned down in 1960. Howard Hughes Corporation owned the 39-acre (16 ha) property from 1966 to 1995, when William Bennett purchased it. Bennett also owned the Sahara Hotel and Casino across the street. Bennett had the property up for sale in 1999 and 2000, at a price of $2.5 million per acre.

In January 2001, Hilton Grand Vacations Company – the timeshare subsidiary of Hilton Hotels Corporation – purchased 10 acres (4.0 ha) of the property for $19.2 million. That month, Hilton announced plans for a 33-story timeshare complex with 1,500 units, to be constructed on the property. Antoine Dagot, chief executive of Hilton Grand Vacations, said the new property would be "one of the largest vacation projects in the world."

The new project would mark Hilton's third timeshare property in Las Vegas, the other two being smaller ventures located at the Flamingo and the Las Vegas Hilton hotel-casinos. The northern end of the Las Vegas Strip had received little development in recent years, with the latest project being the Stratosphere in 1996. Stephen Bollenbach, the chief executive of Hilton Hotels, said, "We can be a leader in revitalizing this part of the Strip. I think this will play a big part in continuing development." Although there was vacant property near the Las Vegas Hilton, Bollenbach said, "We think our customers would like to be on the Strip, and we think this is a very good piece of property."

Groundbreaking for the new project took place on June 14, 2001, with Penta Building Group as the general contractor. The first phase, with an expected 350 units, was scheduled to open 18 months later, with construction costs at $111 million. The first phase was to be followed by a gradual expansion over the next decade that would bring the number of units up to the planned 1,500 number. On September 24, 2001, Hilton announced that construction had been temporarily stopped due to a decrease in revenues at its hotels in the United States, which was caused by low tourism as a result of the September 11 attacks. Construction on the building had reached the fourth floor at the time of the delay. Hilton planned to re-evaluate the project after six months.

In April 2002, Hilton announced that construction had resumed on the project, with completion estimated for January 2004. At that time, the first phase was expected to include 295 units, while the overall property was ultimately expected to have up to 1,523 units. The Hilton Grand Vacations Club held its grand opening on February 4, 2004. The new property featured a desert deco design, and consisted of a 28-story tower with 283 units, built at a cost of $128 million. At the time of its opening, Hilton planned to build three additional towers on the 10-acre property.

In May 2004, Hilton announced plans for its $126 million second phase, consisting of a 38-story tower with 431 timeshare units. Construction was to begin in July 2004, with completion scheduled for summer 2006. An ultimate total of 1,577 units was being planned for the property at that time. The second phase began construction in September 2004, with Penta Building Group as general contractor. The second tower was completed in 2006. Both towers were designed by MBH Architects, and contain a combined total of 714 units.

== Gallery ==
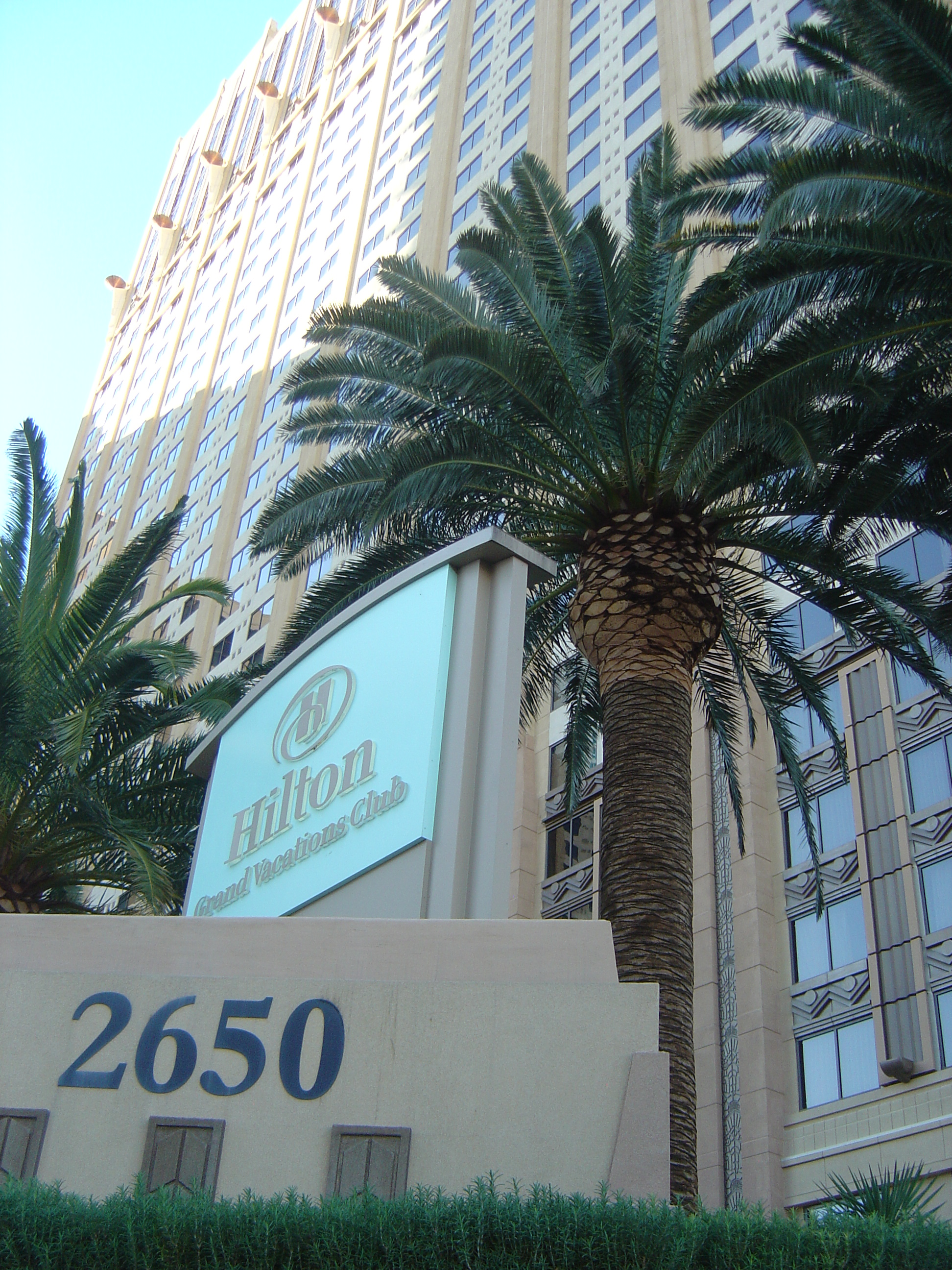
Entrance

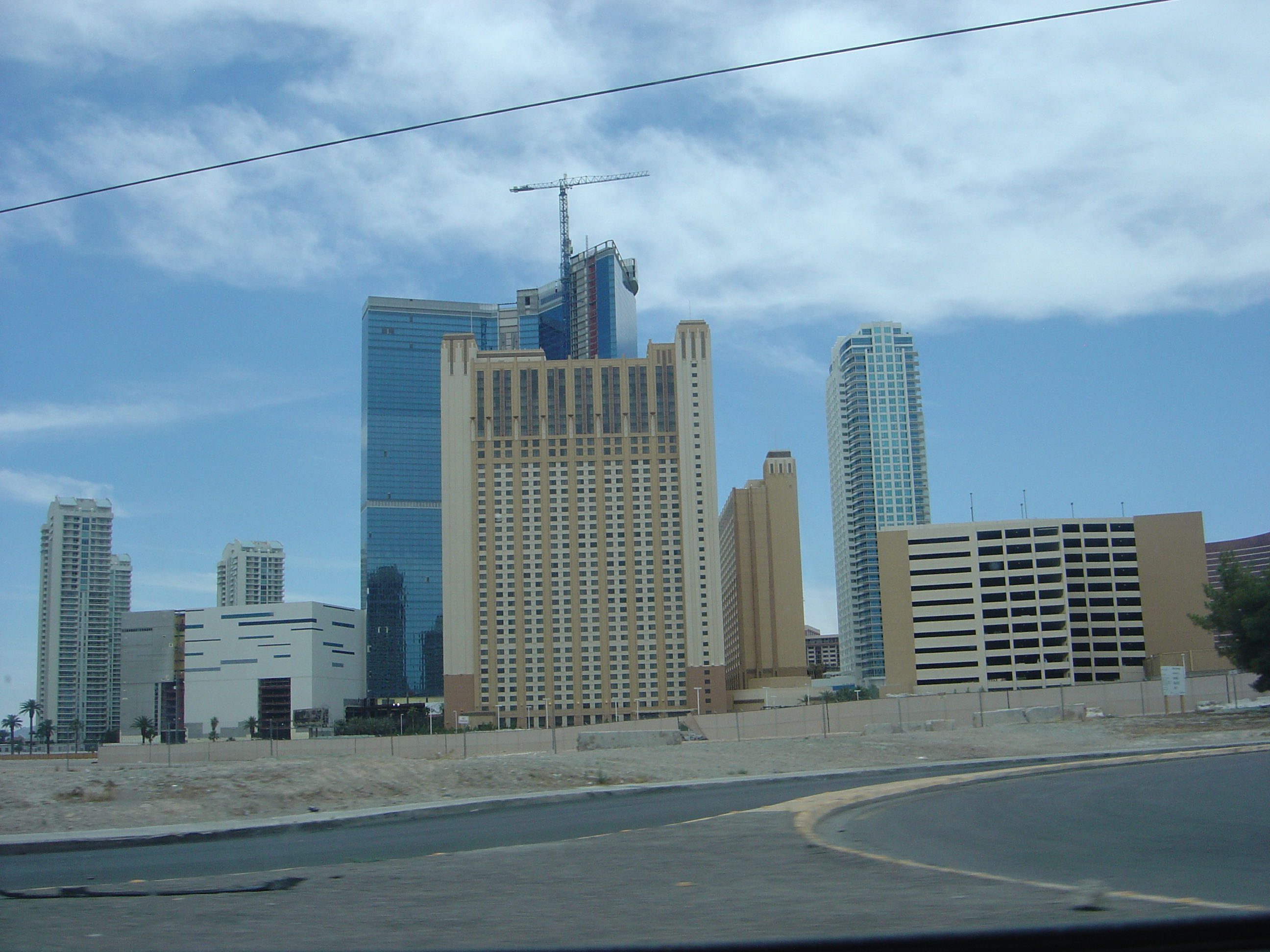
View from South Bridge Lane

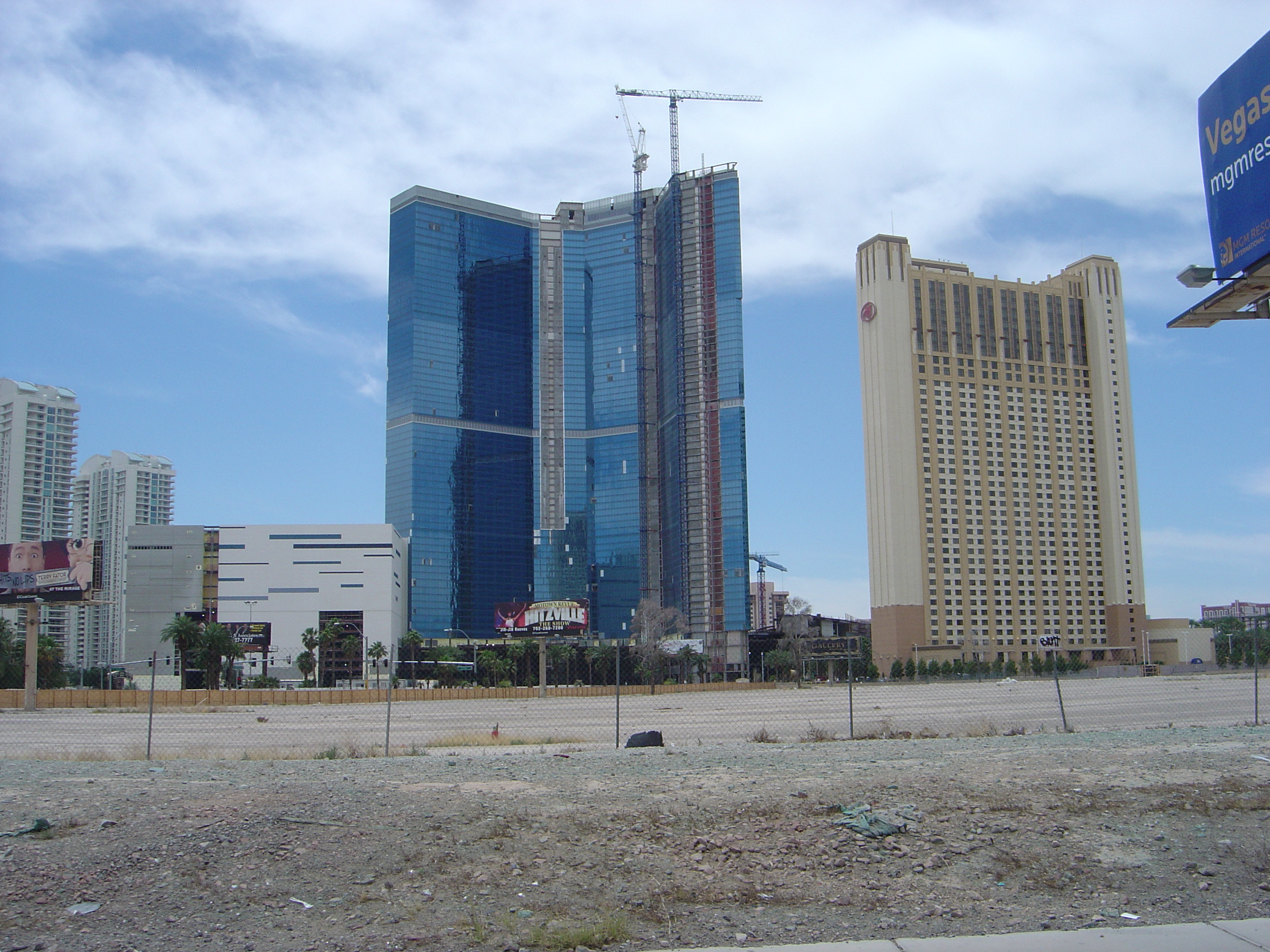
View from West Sahara Avenue; Fontainebleau is seen on the left.

== See also ==
- Elara, another Hilton Grand Vacations resort on the Las Vegas Strip
