= BXG =

BXG or bxg may refer to:

- Bangala language (ISO 639-3: bxg), a Bantu language spoken in the northeast corner of the Democratic Republic of the Congo
- Bendigo Airport (Victoria) (IATA: BXG), an airport in East Bendigo, Bendigo, Victoria, Australia
- Bluegreen Corporation (NYSE: BXG), an American private vacation ownership company based in Boca Raton, Florida
