= Susan H. Wixon =

American freethought writer, editor, feminist and educator

Susan Helen Wixon
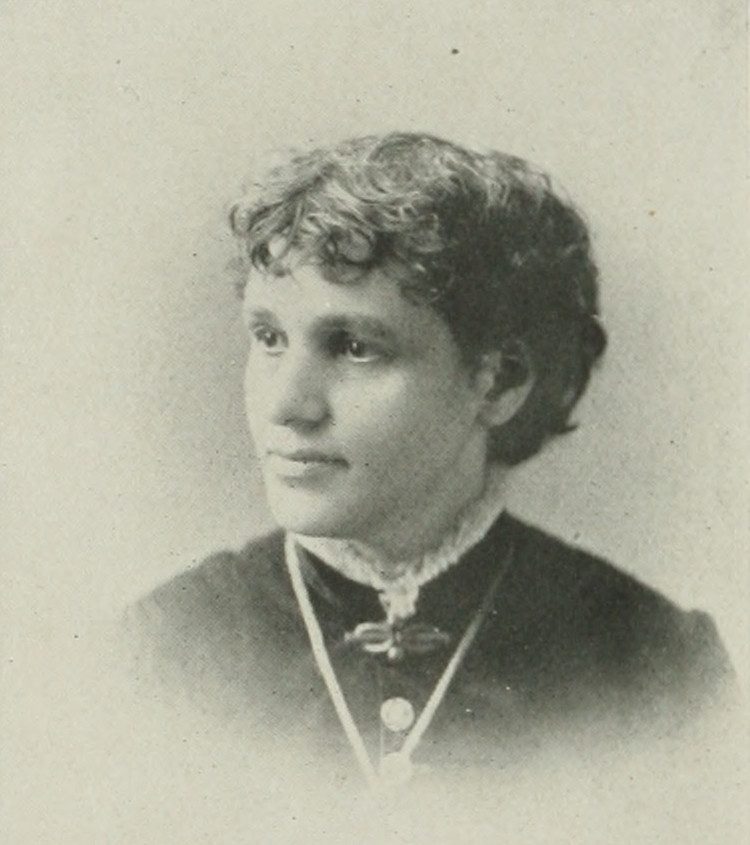
- Photo in A Woman of the Century
- Born: October 1839 Dennis Port, Massachusetts, U.S.
- Died: August 28, 1912 (aged 72) Fall River, Massachusetts, U.S.
- Occupation: school board member; writer; editor; feminist; educator

Signature
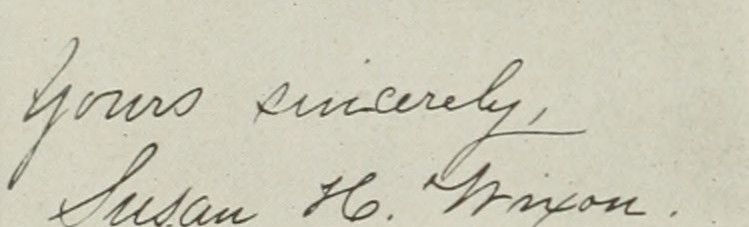

Susan H. Wixon (October, 1839 - August 28, 1912) was an American freethought writer, editor, feminist, and educator of the long nineteenth century. She was a member of the Fall River School Board for 24 years. Wixon especially espoused the cause of women and children. In both politics and religion, she held radical views. She was the author of Apples of gold, and other stories for boys and girls (1876), Summer days at Onset (1887), Woman : four centuries of progress (1893), Sunday observance, or, How to spend Sunday (1893), Right living (1894), All in a lifetime : a romance (1894), and Some familiar places (1901).

== Early life and education ==
Susan Helen Wixon was born in Dennisport, a neighborhood in Dennis, Massachusetts, in October, 1839. (Note: Flynn & Dawkins (2007) state Wixon was born ca. late 1840s.) She was of Welsh descent. Her parents were Captain James Wixon and Bethia Smith Wixon.

Wixon was a good student and, before she was thirteen years old, she was teaching a district school. The committee hesitated about appointing her, on account of her extreme youth and diminutive size. "Indeed, I can teach," she said. "Give me a chance, and see!" They did so, and she did well. Denied a college education by her father, she did, however, attend a seminary for a year.

== Career ==
Wixon taught successfully for several years in Massachusetts and Rhode Island, and desired to make that profession her career. Early in life, after the loss of four brothers at sea, all at one time, the family removed from their country home to Fall River, Massachusetts, where Wixon continued to live as an adult with her sister, Bethia. In 1873, she was elected a member of the school board of that city, serving three years. Endorsed by the Democrats in 1890, she was again elected to that position. In 1903, she was appointed a special commissioner by Gov. John L. Bates.

For several years, Wixon had the editorial charge of the children's department of The Truth Seeker, a New York City-based freethought publication. She was a contributor to several magazines and newspapers, and at one time was a regular reporter on the staff of the Boston Sunday Record. Wixon wrote in prose and poetry. Her poem, "When Womanhood Awakes," is considered one of the most inspiring among the poems written in the behalf of women. Her hymns include, "Come sound the praise of truth's fair name", "Dare to be true, whatever your station", "Her merry voice is strangely hushed", and "What of thy life, O friend of mine". Among her published books were, Apples of Gold (Boston, 1876); Sunday Observance (1883); All In a Lifetime (Boston, 1884); The Story Hour (New York, 1885); and Summer Days at Onset (Boston, 1887), besides tracts and pamphlets. One of her books, Right Living, a treatise on ethics, was used by many colleges and schools, both in the United States and in England.

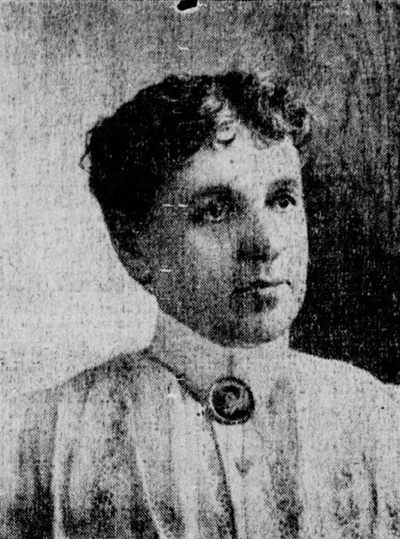
Susan Helen Wixon (1901)

Wixon was an ardent supporter of all reformatory measures. She lectured on moral reform and educational topics, and was interested in scientific matters. She was a member of the executive council of the Woman's National Liberal Union, whose first convention was held in Washington, D.C. in February, 1890. It was her suggestion to Gov. William Russell, and her able representation of the need of women as factory inspectors in Massachusetts, that caused the appointment of two women to that position in 1891. In 1892, she organized the Woman's Educational and Industrial Club, serving as president in 1901. Also in 1892, she made a tour of Europe, studying principally the tariff question upon her return, her opinions, published in Fall River, aroused interest and discussion. She served as president of the Humboldt Scientific Society and president of the Woman's Educational and Industrial Society, of Fall River. She was a member of the Woman's Relief Corps, the Clio Club, the Daughters of the American Revolution, and the Natural History Club. She was elected a member of the committee on woman's industrial advancement for World's Columbian Exposition (1893), in the inventors' department.

== Death and legacy ==
Wixon died at her home in Fall River, August 28, 1912.

The Susan H. Wixon School, in Fall River, was named in her honor.

== Selected works ==
- Apples of gold, and other stories for boys and girls (1876)
- Summer days at Onset (1887)
- Woman : four centuries of progress (1893)
- Sunday observance, or, How to spend Sunday (1893)
- Right living (1894)
- All in a lifetime : a romance (1894)
- Some familiar places (1901)
