= North Beach Malt House =

Building in San Francisco, California

Coordinates: 37°48′17″N 122°24′45″W

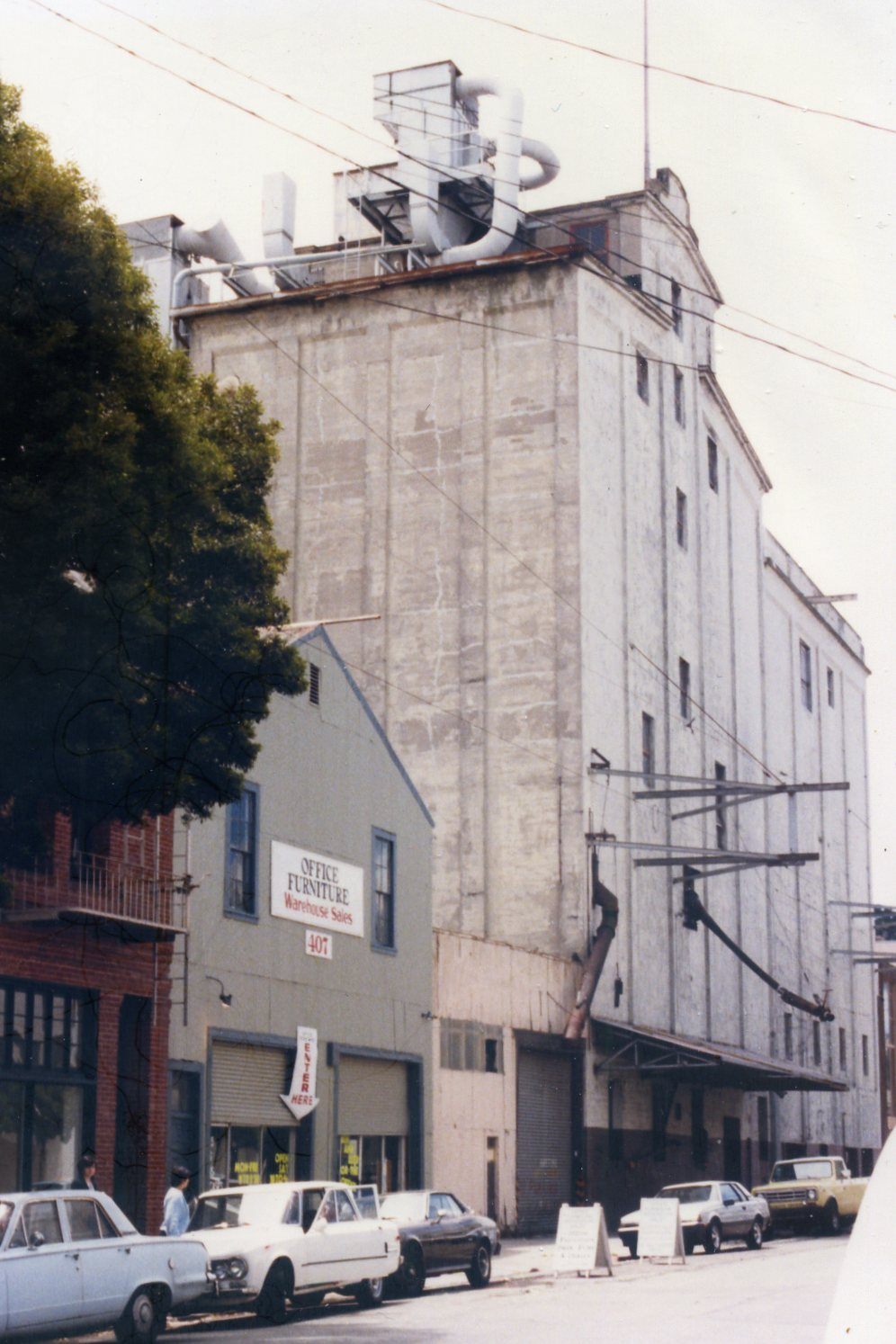
In 1986, before conversion into condos

The North Beach Malt House is an historical landmark building, located at 445 Francisco Street in San Francisco, California. It originally served as a malting factory and brewery for 40 years. It was nearly destroyed in the 1906 San Francisco earthquake.

The owner at the time, George W. Bauer, rebuilt the Malt House using concrete and steel girders. His company, Bauer & Schweitzer, continued to supply malt to Bay Area breweries, including the Anchor Brewing Company, into the 1970s.

Following its closure in 1981, the building fell into disrepair and was then used for the on-site filming of several movies and TV shows, including Don Johnson’s Nash Bridges.

The site was developed into condominiums in the mid-90s and began selling in 2001. MBH Architects kept as much of the original structure as possible (even the two-story grain silos), creating a European-style residential properties with 88 loft units, ranging from 800 to 1,600 sf each. The complex has a courtyard measuring 150 x 60 feet.
