= Bluegreen Corporation =

American private vacation ownership company

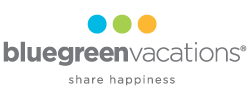
- Type: Subsidiary
- Traded as: NYSE: BXG
- Industry: Real estate
- Founded: 1966 (as Patten Realty Corporation)
- Headquarters: 4960 Conference Way N #100, Boca Raton, Florida, United States
- Number of locations: 50 resorts (Many slated to be rebranded to Hilton brands)
- Area served: United States, Caribbean
- Key people: Alan Levan (CEO); Raymond S. Lopez (CFO); Ahmad M. Wardak (CMO)
- Products: Real estate-based vacation ownership plans
- Number of employees: 4,500+ (2013)
- Parent: Hilton Grand Vacations
- Website: Bluegreen Vacations

Bluegreen Corporation is an American private vacation ownership brand that is currently a wholly owned subsidiary of Hilton Grand Vacations. The company provides vacations at 50 owned or managed resorts on a time-share basis, with alternative resort and cruise options available through upselling and third-party exchanges. Bluegreen makes its services available to other resort operators on a fee-for-service basis.

Originally a land-sale company founded as Patten Realty Corporation in 1966, Bluegreen also developed land into residential and golf course communities until 2012. The company currently has three primary divisions: Bluegreen Resorts oversees the time-share program, Bluegreen Vacations manages the Bluegreen Vacation Club point system, and Outdoor Traveler markets Bluegreen programs at Bass Pro stores.

Beyond Bass Pro, Bluegreen also has ongoing partnerships with companies such as Choice Hotels International. In 2012 Bluegreen's profits came to $458 million and total assets equaled to $1.08 billion. Bluegreen's philanthropic efforts include support of organizations such as the American Red Cross and JDRF.

== History ==
=== Founding and early years (1966-1984) ===
Bluegreen Corporation was formed in Massachusetts in 1966 as Patten Realty. Founder Harry Patten had previously worked in sales at American Central, a developer of vacation home sites, and by 1964, he had saved enough to develop a single property himself. Purchasing a $15,000 parcel in rural Stamford, Vermont, Patten took on a partner and headquartered the business in the 25-room Stamford estate. Their original core business was regional in scope. Patten Realty would purchase large tracts of undeveloped or lightly developed land, usually with token down payments, from farmers unable to market it themselves. Then, they paid to have the land subdivided, and would resell the resulting 5- to 20-acre parcels to city dwellers as recreational or potential property.

Patten branched off as an independent developer after ten years, and in 1976, he incorporated the business as Patten Realty Corporation. In 1982, Patten Realty Corporation opened its first regional office branch in Portland, Maine. Annual sales increased more than tenfold, to $35 million, between 1981 and 1984 as Patten expanded outside the Northeast, and Patten was named by Fortune as one of 1985's “50 Most Fascinating Business People.”

=== IPO and move to Florida (1985-1993) ===
Patten Realty Corporation went public with an initial public offering in November 1985, and in 1986, it was listed on the New York Stock Exchange as Patten Corporation, or Patten Corp. By January 1986, Patten Corp. was "the biggest gainer on the New York Stock Exchange," after its stock prices quadrupled in one year. With branches in fifteen states by early 1986, by the end of 1986, Patten Corp. remained the third fastest-growing company on the exchange. From the midpoints of fiscal 1986 through 1987, profits increased 175%, and Patten Corp. had total assets totaling $324 million by March 1988, as compared to $14 million four years earlier. Debt also increased in that time to help finance land purchases from 1987 and 1988. By the end of 1988, Patten Realty's annual revenue equaled $120 million, with net earnings of $15.1 million. In the late 1980s the company faced a bout of bad publicity over allegedly deceptive marketing, with several New England states opening investigations into the company's sales practices. While denying any wrongdoing, in 1989, Patten settled with New York, Vermont, Massachusetts, Maine, and New Hampshire by agreeing to refund consumers "who could prove they were deceived" on issues such as lease details.

Patten Corp. experienced $45 million in losses in 1989 and 1990, with stock value dipping before rebounding again. Patten Realty was profiled on 60 Minutes in March 1991. That year the company relocated its headquarters to Boca Raton, Florida, with a number of staff remaining in Vermont. The company was profitable within six months of the move. Around that time Patten continued to restructure the business to improve cash flow, and in the early 1990s Patten Corp. sold holdings in the northeast United States to focus on the midwest and southeast. Patten Corp. furthermore worked on cutting its debt load, and by 1994 it had seen its stock value improve significantly since the dip in 1991.

=== Change to Bluegreen Corporation (1993-1999) ===
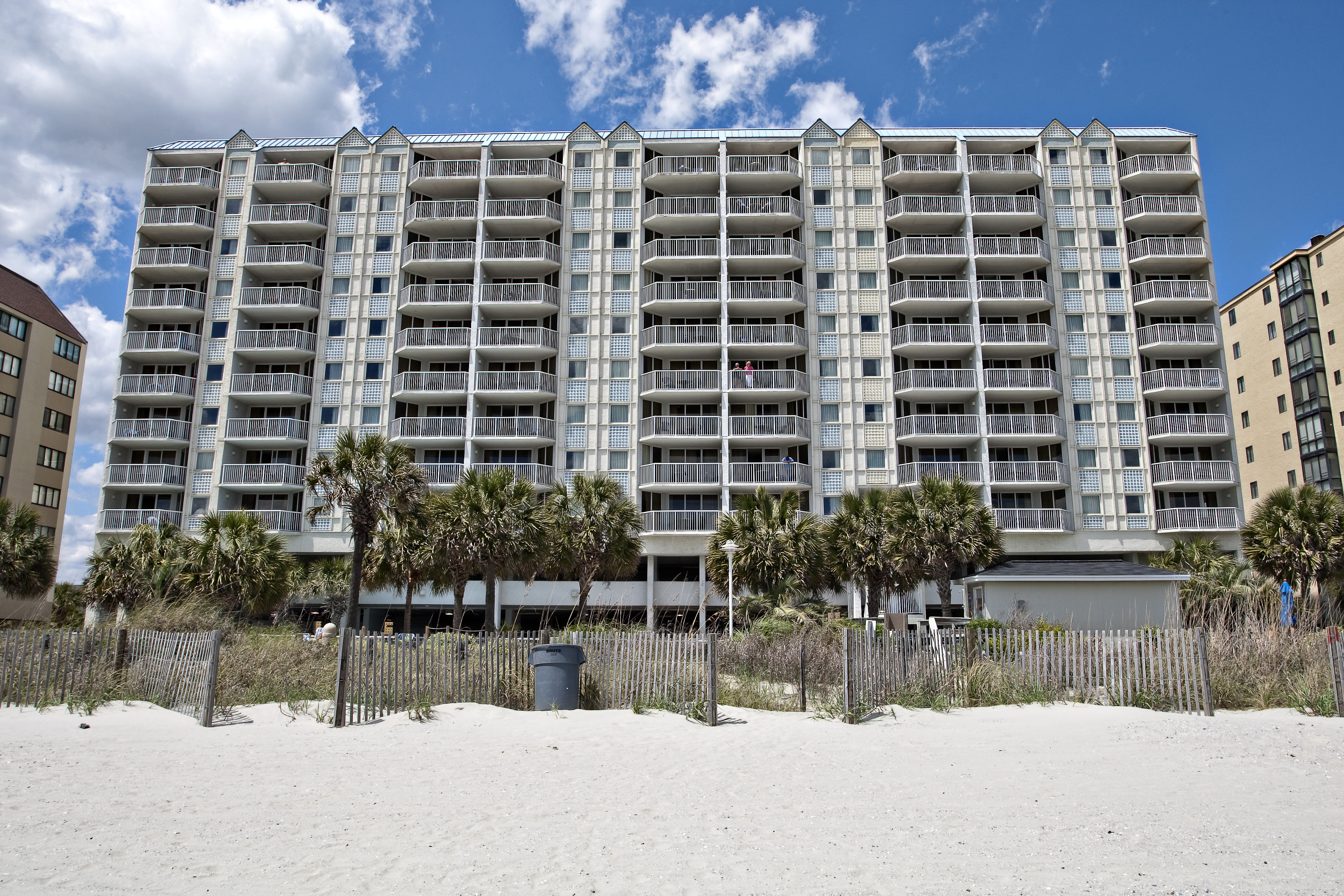
Shore Crest Villas at North Myrtle Beach, located on Ocean Drive in South Carolina, is one of Bluegreen Corporation's timeshare properties.

George F. Donovan was named president and chief operating officer in 1993, and later that year he took on Patten's role as CEO. Patten would resign as chairman and sell his remaining 8% stake in Patten Corp. in late 1994. Donovan, who had a background in both timeshares and golf community development, reorganized the company into land, timeshare and home sale divisions, forming the Bluegreen Resorts and Bluegreen Communities divisions in 1994. That year Patten Corp. purchased land in Gatlinburg, Tennessee to develop its first timeshare, MountainLoft. In August 1995, Patten Corp. opened a second resort bordering Great Smoky Mountains National Park, and the following month the company acquired land in North Myrtle Beach, South Carolina, for a third resort and first oceanfront property, which opened in 1996. The company was renamed Bluegreen Corporation in February 1996.

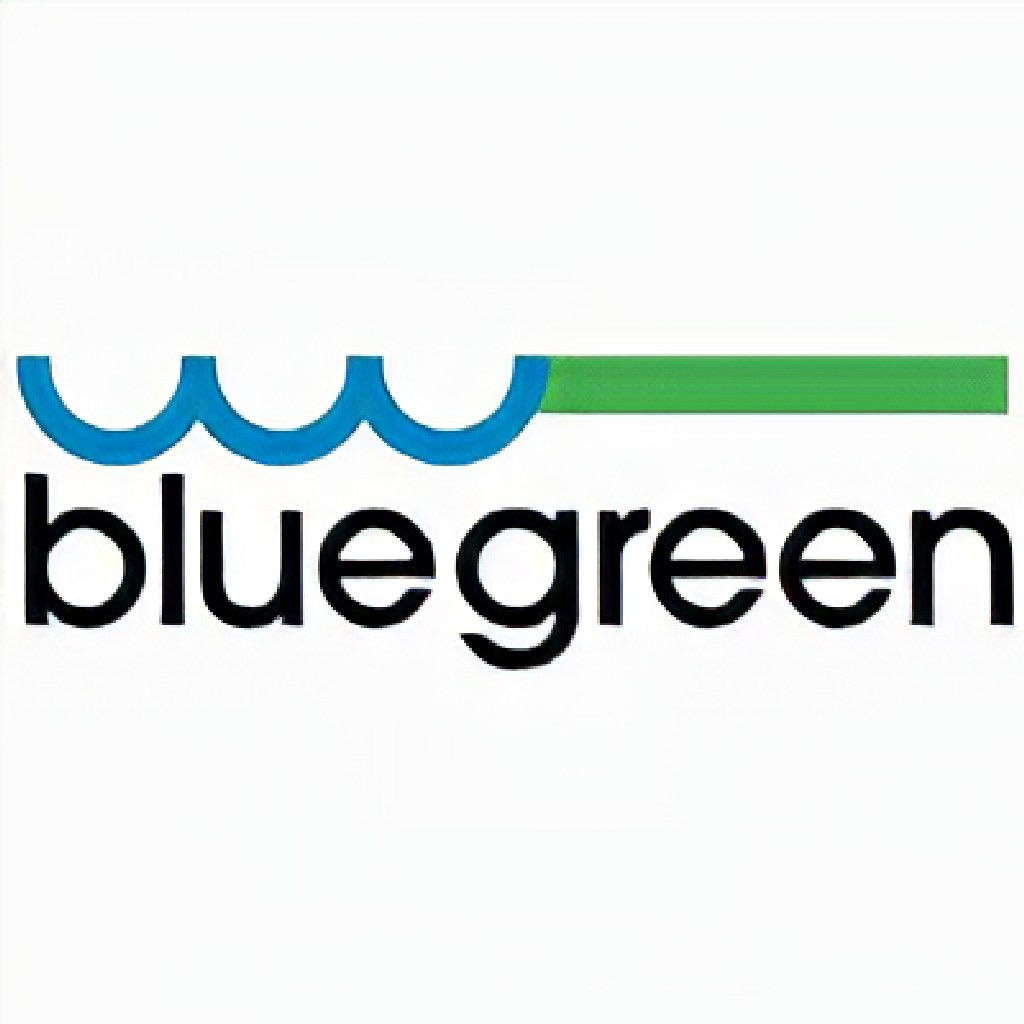
Bluegreen Logo used from 1994-2014

Bluegreen acquired RDI Group in 1997 for $7.5 million, which was a private "vacation ownership developer and operator of a points-based vacation club." Through RDI, Bluegreen acquired resorts in Florida and Wisconsin, as well as "management contracts with resorts across the Southeast." The Bluegreen Vacation Club was formed as a direct result. Bluegreen opened its first daily fee golf course in 1997, designed by Fred Couples and located in North Carolina. Bluegreen Communities then sold lots around the golf course to homeowners, heralding a new business model for Bluegreen that the company also extended to other developments. That year, the company recorded sales of US$115.9 million. In 1998, Bluegreen expanded into Aruba, and the following year, Bluegreen entered the "urban timeshare market" by acquiring an inn in South Carolina. In 1999, the company had record net profits of $17 million and overall sales of $257.7 million.

=== Partnerships (2000-2011) ===
In 2000, Bluegreen established a cross-industry marketing agreement with Bass Pro, also marketing its Bluegreen Wilderness Club franchise through the Bass Pro subsidiary Big Cedar. Bluegreen subsequently formed an alliance with Boyne USA Resorts in 2002, also opening two more golf courses that year, one designed by Curtis Strange and one by Davis Love III. Later in 2002, Bluegreen acquired TakeMeOnVacation, L.L.C., a company which generated sales leads. TakeMeOnVacation's software systems were reworked for Bluegreen Direct, a newly formed direct marketing business unit. After BankAtlantic Bankcorp in Fort Lauderdale acquired a 40 percent interest in Bluegreen in 2002, in 2003 Bluegreen expanded into Montana and Michigan, with annual sales reaching US$438 million. The following year sales totaled US$600 million, while by 2005 Bluegreen had revenues of US$684.2 million and 4,076 employees.

Bluegreen had two primary divisions as of 2005. Bluegreen Communities marketed and sold housing units in upscale markets, while Bluegreen Resorts was involved with the resort timeshare business with the Bluegreen Vacation Club brand. In 2005, Forbes ranked Bluegreen No. 57 on its 200 Best Small Companies list. Bluegreen opened its first resort in Las Vegas in 2006. Donovan retired as Bluegreen President and CEO at the end of that year, and was succeeded by John M. Maloney, Jr. Since 2009, Bluegreen has made its development, management, sales and marketing, title, mortgage and financial services available to other resort operators on a fee-for-service basis.

=== Return to private ownership (2012-2016) ===
In May 2012, Bluegreen sold its Bluegreen Communities division to Dallas-based SouthStar Development Partners for $29 million, with Southstar also acquiring several of Bluegreen's residential neighborhoods. As a result of selling its community division, Bluegreen became a pure-play company for the first time since 1994. Diamond Resorts attempted to purchase Bluegreen for $197 million in June 2012, which Bluegreen refused. That year Bluegreen reported total revenues of $457.7 million and income from continuing operations of $54.3 million. Equity equaled $349 million and total assets equaled $1.08 billion.

In 2013 Bluegreen formed an alliance with Choice Hotels International, and on April 2, 2013, Bluegreen merged with Woodbridge Holdings, a subsidiary of BFC Financial Corporation and BBX Capital Corporation. Immediately prior to the merger, BFC Financial had, through additional transactions, come to own 53% of Bluegreen. As such, Bluegreen became a wholly owned subsidiary of BFC Financial Corporation. Continuing to focus on its time-share business model, by the spring of 2013, Bluegreen had "over 60 owned or managed resorts, and access to more than 4,000 resorts and other vacation experiences such as cruises and hotel stays worldwide."

== Business model ==
Originally a land-sale company focused on reselling rural plots of around 200 acres or more, Bluegreen until 2012 developed the land it purchased into residential and golf course communities, marketing home sites within the tracts directly to consumers. Later branching into resorts and timeshares, the company is also known as an industry pioneer in the practice of offering fee-based services. Bluegreen's core business is currently the marketing, selling and servicing of vacation ownership interests (VOIs) known collectively as the Bluegreen Vacation Club. Under Bluegreen's vacation program, customers buy vacation points as compared to a specific property. However, they are still considered "owners" on a legal basis because they purchase an interest in a company resort held in their trust. Under the system, customers can plan stays at various timeshare resorts operated by Bluegreen or its corporate partners in North America, particularly along the Gulf Coast. With the point system, owners can also stay at several thousand affiliated resorts overseas, and vacation points can be traded, sold, or rented to others. As of 2013, the company provided vacations to around 170,000 users in the form of stays at company-managed resorts (more than 60) plus hotel, resort and cruise options available through upselling and third-party exchanges.

== Resort locations ==
Bluegreen Vacations Resorts
Property	Location
Cibola Vista Resort and Spa	Peoria, Arizona
The Club at Big Bear Villaga	Big Bear Lake, California
Streamside at Vail	Vail, Colorado
The Innsbruck at Aspen	Aspen, Colorado
Bayside Resort and Spa	Panama City Beach, Florida
Daytona SeaBreeze	Daytona Beach Shores, Florida
Dolphin Beach Club	Daytona Beach Shores, Florida
Fantasy Island Resort II	Daytona Beach Shores, Florida
Casa Del Mar	Ormond Beach, Florida
Grande Villas at World Golf	St. Augustine, Florida
The Fountains Resort	Orlando, Florida
Orlando Sunshine Resort	Orlando, Florida
Via Roma Resort	Bradenton Beach, Florida
Resort Sixty-Six	Holmes Beach, Florida
Gulfstream Manor	Gulf Stream, Florida
Solara Surfside	Surfside, Florida
The Hammocks at Marathon	Marathon, Florida
The Studio Homes at Ellis Square	Savannah, Georgia
Hotel Blake	Chicago, Illinois
The Marquee	New Orleans, Louisiana
Bluegreen Club at La Pension	New Orleans, Louisiana
The Breakers	Dennis Port, Massachusetts
The Soundings	Dennis Port, Massachusetts
Mountain Run at Boyne	Boyne, Michigan
The Falls Village	Branson, Missouri
Paradise Point	Hollister, Missouri
The Wilderness Club at Big Cedar	Ridgedale, Missouri
The Cliffs at Long Creek	Ridgedale, Missouri
South Mountain Resort	Lincoln, New Hampshire
Bluegreen Club 36	Las Vegas, Nevada
The Manhattan Club	New York City, New York
Blue Ridge Village	Banner Elk, North Carolina
Club Lodges at Trillium	Cashiers, North Carolina
The Suites at Hershey	Hershey, Pennsylvania
King 583	Charleston, South Carolina
The Lodge Alley Inn	Charleston, South Carolina
SeaGlass Tower	Myrtle Beach, South Carolina
Carolina Grande	Myrtle Beach, South Carolina
Horizons at 77th	Myrtle Beach, South Carolina
Harbour Lights	Myrtle Beach, South Carolina
Shore Crest Vacation Villas	North Myrtle Beach, South Carolina
Mountain Loft	Gatlinburg, Tennessee
Laurel Crest	Pigeon Forge, Tennessee
Bluegreen Downtown Nashville	Nashville, Tennessee
Elian Hotel and Spa	San Antonio, Texas
Shenandoah Crossing	Gordonsville, Virginia
Patrick Henry Square	Williamsburg, Virginia
Parkside Williamsburg Resort	Williamsburg, Virginia
Christmas Mountain Village	Wisconsin Dells, Wisconsin
Bluegreen Odyssy Dells	Wisconsin Dells, Wisconsin

== See also ==
- List of top employers in Boca Raton, Florida
- Real estate
- Resort fee
