= Benjamin F. Baker =

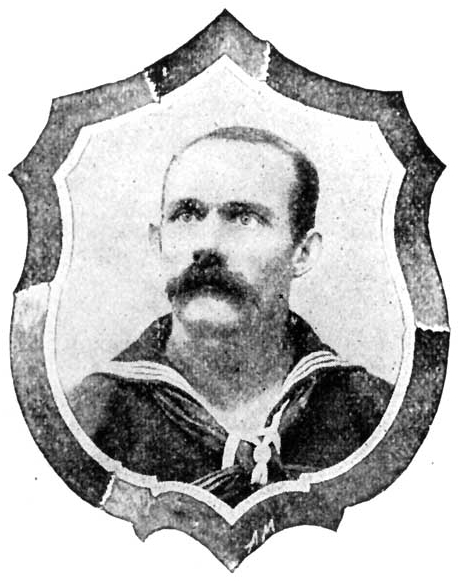
- Benjamin F. Baker
- Born: March 12, 1862; Dennis, Massachusetts, US
- Died: May 19, 1927 (aged 65); Dennis Port, Massachusetts, US
- Burial place: Swan Lake Cemetery
- Military career
- Allegiance: United States
- Branch: United States Navy
- Service years: 1885–1915
- Rank: Chief Master-at-Arms
- Unit: USS Nashville
- Conflicts: Spanish–American War
- Awards: Medal of Honor

Benjamin Franklin Baker (March 12, 1862 – May 19, 1927) was a United States Navy sailor and a recipient of America's highest military decoration, the Medal of Honor. He is the only Medal of Honor recipient from Cape Cod.

== Biography ==
Benjamin Franklin Baker was born on March 12, 1862 in Dennis Port, Massachusetts. He joined the United States Navy in 1885, and served in the Spanish–American War on board USS Nashville. On May 11, 1898, while serving as a Coxswain, he was one of several men who took part in a boat expedition that cut the underwater telegraph cable off Cienfuegos, Cuba. For his "extraordinary bravery and coolness" under enemy fire during this operation, he was awarded the Medal of Honor.

During his service, he would often skip meals and sent the 50 cents he saved home to his family instead. Baker retired from the Navy with the rank of Chief Master-at-Arms in 1915.

Chief Baker died on May 19, 1927, at Dennis Port, Massachusetts and was buried in Swan Lake Cemetery in the same town. His grave is cared for by AMVETS Baker Xiarhos Post 333. In 2015, the Dennis Historical Commission honored his service with the first public recognition of his award since his death.

== Medal of Honor citation ==
Rank and organization: Coxswain, U.S. Navy. Born: March 12, 1862, Dennisport, Mass. G.O. No.: 521, July 7, 1899.

Citation:

On board the U.S.S. Nashville during the cutting of the cable leading from Cienfuegos, Cuba, May 11, 1898. Facing the heavy fire of the enemy, Baker set an example of extraordinary bravery and coolness throughout this action.

== See also ==
- List of Medal of Honor recipients
- List of Medal of Honor recipients for the Spanish–American War
