= Fortune Battle of the Corporate Bands =

The Fortune Battle of the Corporate Bands is an annual music competition for amateur company-sponsored bands in the United States, Europe and Australia. Created in 2001, the contest's proceeds benefit the Rock and Roll Hall of Fame in Cleveland, Ohio, which also serves as the location for the final round of the competition. The Fortune Battle of the Corporate Bands is presented through a partnership with Fortune magazine and the Hall of Fame, and is sponsored by the NAMM Foundation, Gibson Guitars, Marshall Fridge and Fender Premium Audio.

The competition is sometimes billed as a "celebration of musicians with day jobs". As of 2013, a requirement is that all participants must be employees of the submitting company.

== Contest origin and purpose ==
The Battle of the Corporate Bands was developed as a joint effort between Fortune magazine and the Rock and Roll Hall of Fame and Museum to enhance the museum's profile in the business community. The two executives most responsible for its creation were Kip Meyer, director of integrated programs for Fortune and Fortune Small Business magazines, and Steve Dobo, director of sponsorships and promotions at the Rock and Roll Hall of Fame.

The competition serves multiple purposes. First, it serves as a fundraiser for the museum's Educational Fund. In the 2007 contest, each entrant submitted a $200 entry fee, and each finalist's company donated $7,300 to take part in the final round. The museum also earns contributions from the competition's corporate sponsors and from ticket sales.

The contest also provides increased exposure to the companies which sponsor the bands, via the media attention generated by the contest, and via recaps of the contest that appear in Fortune.

== Contest format ==
The contest entry process begins early in the year, when bands submit a three-song CD to a panel of judges, typically due in late April. During the first three years of the contest, this panel selected the eight national finalists. For every year since then, the judging panel selects 18 US bands to participate in one of three qualifying US regional "Battles" which are held in the summer. Locations for the US regional contests vary from year to year—the 2007 regionals were held in Nashville, Tennessee, Los Angeles, and Austin, Texas. In 2008 a European regional was added for the first time, in London, UK. Six bands from around Europe are selected for the European regional.

At each regional event, each of the six bands performs a 20-minute set. The judges then choose two finalists from each US regional, plus the one winner of the European regional. After all of the regionals have been completed, the judges choose an additional one or two bands as "wild card" finalists, typically making eight finalists in all.

In some years, a finalist is included from Australia. Since 2004, Telstra, an Australian telecommunications and information services company, has sponsored their own national competition, called RockInc. The winner of RockInc is automatically entitled to a spot in the Fortune competition final.

On the day of the finals, held at the Rock and Roll Hall of Fame in October, each band performs a 30-minute non-judged showcase for the public during the day. That evening, each band plays a 15-minute set for a panel of music industry judges. The judges will then select a winner, dubbed "The Best Corporate Band in America" for that year, along with 2nd and 3rd-place winners.

== Contest awards ==
Members of the winning band receive an expenses-paid trip to the annual NAMM Show, where they will be a featured performer. In 2007, Continental Airlines also awarded two airline tickets for each member of the winning band. The band also has its name and photo displayed at the Rock Hall of Fame for one year as part of a permanent exhibit honoring the event. The winning band also receives a "gold record" trophy, along with varsity jackets embroidered with their band's name and the contest logo. First-place bands are not allowed to enter the competition again.

Awards are also given to individuals for Best Guitarist, Best Bass Player, Best Keyboardist, Best Vocalist, Best Horn and Best Drummer.

== Results ==
Result	Band	Corporate affiliation	Location
2014, 6 September
1st	Cleyson Brown Unlimited	Sprint Corporation	Overland Park, Kansas
2nd	Toy Box	Hello World	Pleasant Ridge, Michigan
3rd	The Toys	Mattel	El Segundo, California
	Kings of the Phone Age	Level 3 Communications	Broomfield, Colorado
	DaVita Blues All Stars	DaVita	Brentwood, Tennessee
	Toys 2 Men	Hasbro	Pawtucket, Rhode Island
	Gwen & the Boys	Pep Boys	Philadelphia, Pennsylvania
	Peripheral Vison	Olympus	Center Valley, Pennsylvania
Best Vocalist	Terri Lowe (DaVita Blues All Stars / DaVita)		
Best Guitarist	David Gullo (Toy Box / Hello World)		
Best Drummer	Jason Smith (Cleyson Brown Unlimited / Sprint Corporation)		
Best Bassist	Frank Minolfo (Cleyson Brown Unlimited / Sprint Corporation)		
Best Keyboardist	Dan Sanfillipo (Toys 2 Men / Hasbro)		
Best Horn Player	David Freeland (Cleyson Brown Unlimited / Sprint Corporation)		
Judges
Judges	Jeff Carlisi	Founding member of 38 Special	
Judges	Ricky Byrd	Guitarist for Joan Jett and Roger Daltrey	
Judges	Liberty Devitto	Drummer for Billy Joel	
Judges	John Regan	Bass player for Peter Frampton and Ace Frehley	
Judges	Rob Arthur	Keyboards for Peter Frampton	
Judges	Antoinette Follet	Editor of Making Music	
2013, 28 September
1st	OTN Speedwagon	Ciena Corporation	Hanover, Maryland
2nd	Detached Retina	Excella Consulting	Arlington, Virginia
3rd	Cassius King	Mesirow Financial	Chicago, Illinois
	The Telematics	Kiewit Corporation	Valley, Nebraska
	Toy Box	ePrize	Pleasant Ridge, Michigan
	Toys 2 Men	Hasbro	Pawtucket, Rhode Island
	Class Action	Marshall Dennehey Warner Coleman & Goggin	King of Prussia, Pennsylvania
	Peripheral Vison	Olympus	Center Valley, Pennsylvania
Best Vocalist	Gina Bloom (Cassius King / Mesirow Financial)		
Best Guitarist	Paul Bullock (OTN Speedwagon / Ciena Corporation)		
Best Drummer	Jonathan Bruskin (Detached Retina / Excella Consulting)		
Best Bassist	Lori Stassin (Cassius King/ Mesirow Financial)		
Best Keyboardist	Nicolai Schurko (Class Action / Marshall Dennehey Warner Coleman & Goggin)		
Best Horn Player	Steve Darflinger (OTN Speedwagon / Ciena Corporation)		
Judges
Judges	Jeff Carlisi	Founding member of .38 Special	
Judges	Ricky Byrd	Guitarist for Joan Jett and Roger Daltrey	
Judges	Liberty Devitto	Drummer for Billy Joel	
Judges	Rob Arthur	Keyboards for Peter Frampton	
Judges	Antoinette Follet	Editor of Making Music	
2010, 2 October
1st	Shaleplay	Chesapeake Energy	Oklahoma City, Oklahoma
2nd	D7	Allied World Assurance Company	Farmington, Connecticut
3rd	The Nuisance	Hinshaw & Culbertson	Chicago, Illinois
	Pete Dale & the Dealmakers	BTI Systems	Ottawa, Ontario
	DaVita Blues All Stars	DaVita	Brentwood, Tennessee
	Unrestricted Entity	Deloitte	New York City, New York
	Title 14	GE Aviation	Hamilton, Ohio
	Underpaid	itelligence, Inc.	Cincinnati, Ohio
Best Vocalist	Katy Igarta (Chesapeake Energy / Shaleplay)		
Best Guitarist	Ryan Schisler (iTelligence / Underpaid)		
Best Drummer	Tom Brodeur (BTI Systems / Pete Dale & the Dealmakers)		
Best Bassist	Chuck Hanley (GE Aviation / Title 14)		
Best Keyboardist	Orlando Luckey (GE Aviation / Title 14)		
Best Horn Player	Daryl Wagner (DaVita / DaVita Blues All Stars)		
Judges
Judges	Alan Parsons	Audio engineer, songwriter, musician, and record producer.	
Judges	Liberty DeVitto	Drummer for Billy Joel	
Judges	Antoinette Follett	Editor of Making Music	
2008, 4 October
1st	The Consumer Republic	Procter & Gamble	Geneva, Switzerland
2nd	4 Inch Studs	MBH Architects	Alameda, California
3rd	D7	Darwin Professional Underwriters	Farmington, Connecticut
	EneROCK	EnerNOC	Boston, Massachusetts
	High Definition	NBCUniversal	Burbank, California
	Looming LARGER	GE Healthcare	Milwaukee, Wisconsin
	Second Shift	Salt River Project	Phoenix, Arizona
	Strat 5	Healthways	Nashville, Tennessee
Best Vocalist	Michel Jouveaux (Procter & Gamble / The Consumer Republic)		
Best Guitarist	Bruce Clement (4 Inch Studs / MBH Architects)		
Best Drummer (tie)	Mike Aldridge (Procter & Gamble / The Consumer Republic)		
	Theo Mordley (NBCUniversal / High Definition)		
Best Bassist	Mike Mann (EnerNOC / EneROCK)		
Best Keyboardist	Roger Rivas (NBCUniversal / High Definition)		
Judges
Judges	Kip Meyer	Co-founder of Fortune Battle of Corporate Bands	
Judges	Felix Cavaliere	Vocalist and Keyboardist for the Rascals	
Judges	Ian Ruddle	Deloitte Consulting	
2007, 6 October
1st	Soul Focus	American Century Investments	Kansas City, Missouri
2nd (tie)	Full Mesh	Juniper Networks	Herndon, Virginia
	The Subliminals	Grey	New York City
3rd	Band Turismo	Sony Computer Entertainment	Foster City, California
	Trainwreck	Calzone Case Company	Bridgeport, Connecticut
	Unrestricted Entity	Deloitte	New York City
	High Definition	NBCUniversal	Burbank, California
Fan's Choice Award	Soul Focus (American Century Investments)		
Best Vocalist	Amanda Bohn, Ivy Mitchell, Maggie Ryder, Denise Raspberry and Erin Sweeney (Grey)		
Best Guitarist	Larry Thomas (American Century Investments)		
Best Drummer	Joe Calzone (Calzone Case Company)		
Best Bassist	Myke "Shyndigg" Heni (Grey)		
Best Keyboardist	Joe Dingwerth (American Century Investments)		
Best Horn Player	Matt Caporaletti and Dave Mullen (Grey)		
Judges
Judges	Ed Bailey	Austin City Limits VP of Brand Development	
Judges	Kenny Olson	guitarist for Kid Rock	
Judges	Jim Fox	drummer for the James Gang	
2006, 7 October
1st	Suit Tie Hi-Fi	Cambridge Australia	Sydney, Australia
2nd	SAS Band	SAS	Cary, North Carolina
3rd	Soul Focus	American Century Investments	Kansas City, Missouri
	4-Inch Studs	MBH Architects	Alameda, California
	Full Mesh	Juniper Networks	Herndon, Virginia
	The Loaners	Quicken Loans	Livonia, Michigan
	Rage the Machine Again	DW Drums	Oxnard, California
	Second Shift	Salt River Project	Phoenix, Arizona
	Unrestricted Entity	Deloitte	New York City
Fan's Choice Award	Soul Focus (American Century Investments)		
Best Vocalist	Mark Potter (Cambridge Australia)		
Best Guitarist	Dana Rafiee (SAS/Destiny)		
Best Drummer	Al Mannarino (SAS)		
Best Bassist	David Leoncavallo (DW Drums)		
Best Keyboardist	Joe Dingwerth (American Century Investments)		
Best Horn Player	Adam Adelkopf (Deloitte)		
Judges
Judges	Jeff Carlisi	38 Special guitarist and founder of Camp Jam Co.	
Judges	Liberty DeVitto	drummer for Billy Joel and other Hall of Fame artists	
Judges	Derek St. Holmes	vocalist and guitarist for Ted Nugent	
Judges	Ricky Byrd	guitarist for Joan Jett and Roger Daltrey	
Judges	Jeff "Skunk" Baxter	guitarist with the Doobie Brothers and Steely Dan	
2005, 8 October
1st	PANTS!	McKinney	Durham, North Carolina
2nd	The Loaners	Quicken Loans	Livonia, Michigan
3rd	Spurious Freedom	Texas Instruments	Tucson, Arizona
	U2 Seaters	Fantastic Furniture	Sydney, Australia
	Second Shift Band	Salt River Project	Phoenix, Arizona
	Direct Connectors	Nextel	Reston, Virginia
	Renal Rockers	Renal Care Group	Nashville, Tennessee
	The Fifth	Lehman Brothers	New York City
Best Guitar	Brian Stapp (Quicken Loans)		
Best Drummer	Tony Zizzo (Texas Instruments)		
Best Keyboards	Chris Longton (Renal Care Group)		
Best Bass	Wes Whitener (McKinney)		
Best Horn	Gene Meros (Nextel)		
Best Vocals	Thomas Armendarez (Texas Instruments)		
Judges
Judges	Jeff Carlisi	38 Special guitarist and founder of Camp Jam Co.	
Judges	Liberty DeVito	drummer for Billy Joel and other Hall of Fame artists	
Judges	G. E. Smith	longtime musical director for NBC's Saturday Night Live	
Judges	Southside Johnny	founder and vocalist for Southside Johnny & the Asbury Jukes	
2004, 2 October
1st	Negative Feedback	eBay	San Jose, California
2nd	Center Stage	Wells Fargo	
3rd	Direct Connectors	Nextel	Reston, Virginia
	The Dinosaurs	CXtec	Syracuse, New York
	The Loomers	Partners & Simon	New York City
	Pulp It Up KC	Kimberly-Clark	Sydney, Australia
	OVP	BP	
	The CopenDavis Band		Davis, California & Copenhagen, Denmark
Best Guitarist	Mark Rongers (OVP)		
Best Bass Player	Mark Holderness (eBay)		
Best Keyboards	Jerry Gray (Wells Fargo)		
Best Drummer	Mike Dorshak (Wells Fargo)		
Best Vocals	Shane McLaughlin (Nextel)		
Judges
Judges	Alan Light	editor-in-chief of Tracks	
Judges	Allan Slutsky	producer, author, musician and Grammy winner	
Judges	Chuck Leavell	musician with the Rolling Stones and the Allman Brothers	
Judges	John Shiely	President and CEO of Briggs & Stratton	
Judges	Marty Rhone	Australian musician	
2003, 8 October
1st	The Residuals	Fleet Capital Leasing	Providence, Rhode Island
2nd	chaingarden	Discreet Logic, Inc., an AutoDesk company	San Rafael, California
3rd	The Briggs Bluesbusters	Briggs & Stratton Corp.	Wauwatosa, Wisconsin
	The Davita Blues All-Stars	DaVita Inc.	Torrance, California
	Blue Truck	American Express Financial Advisors, Inc.	Minneapolis, Minnesota
	Parts Rock And Accessories Roll	Harley-Davidson Inc.	Milwaukee, Wisconsin
	Yield to Maturity	National City Corporation	Cleveland, Ohio
	SonicTones	Sonic Industries	Oklahoma City, Oklahoma
Best Guitarist	Morgwn McCarty (Autodesk)		
Judges
Judges	Seymour Stein	Chairman of London-Sire Records and President of the Rock & Roll Hall of Fame Foundation	
Judges	Marky Ramone	drummer for the Ramones	
Judges	Roger McNamee	executive with Integral Capital Partners and member of the Flying Other Brothers	
Judges	Johnny A.	renowned session and solo guitarist	
2002, 5 October
1st	The Raving Daves	PeopleSoft	Pleasanton, California
2nd	The Marsh Bluesbrokers	Marsh & McLennan Companies	New York City
3rd	The Briggs Bluesbusters	Briggs & Stratton Corp.	Wauwatosa, Wisconsin
	DC-Nine	Deloitte	
	Parts Rock And Accessories Roll	Harley-Davidson	Milwaukee, Wisconsin
	The Rolling Bones (AKA the Off Wall Street Jam Band)		New York City
	Invacare	Invacare	Elyria, Ohio
	The MCSi Band	MCSi	Vista, California
	The Soul City Survivors	Daum Commercial Real Estate	Valencia, California
	Proxy	HealthSouth	Birmingham, Alabama
Best Guitarist	Ira Stanley (the MCSI Band)		
Best Bass Player	Vince Orange (Parts Rock And Accessories Roll)		
Best Vocalist	Jonda Madison (the Marsh Bluesbrokers)		
Best Drummer	Kirk Sarkisian (the Marsh Bluesbrokers)		
Judges
Judges	Seymour Stein	Chairman of London-Sire Records and President of the Rock & Roll Hall of Fame Foundation	
Judges	Jimmy Fox	former drummer for the James Gang and the Outsiders	
Judges	Sam Moore	member of soul group Sam & Dave	
2001, 6 October
1st	The Difference	Air Products & Chemicals	Allentown, Pennsylvania
2nd	The Briggs Bluesbusters	Briggs & Stratton Corp.	Wauwatosa, Wisconsin
	EnteraRocks	Enterasys	Andover, Massachusetts
	The Flying Other Brothers	various Silicon Valley firms	California
	The James O Band	McKinsey & Company	
	The Raving Daves	PeopleSoft	Pleasanton, California
	DC-Nine	Deloitte	
	Parts Rock And Accessories Roll	Harley-Davidson	Milwaukee, Wisconsin
	The Rolling Bones	various Wall Street firms	New York City
Best Guitarist	John Rachkoskie (Enterasys)		
Judges
Judges	Seymour Stein	Chairman of London-Sire Records and President of the Rock & Roll Hall of Fame Foundation	
Judges	Tom Zito	co-founder of GarageBand.com	
Judges	Lenny Kaye	rock critic, producer and guitarist for Patti Smith	

== Trivia ==
- In the same year (2003) Fleet Capital Leasing's the Residuals won "Best Band" honors, lead vocalist Howard Merritt won a near-record amount on NBC's primetime game show The Weakest Link.
- Just three weeks before his win for Best Horn in 2007, Grey's Matt Caporaletti was a champion on the TV game show Jeopardy!.
