= Elara (timeshare) =

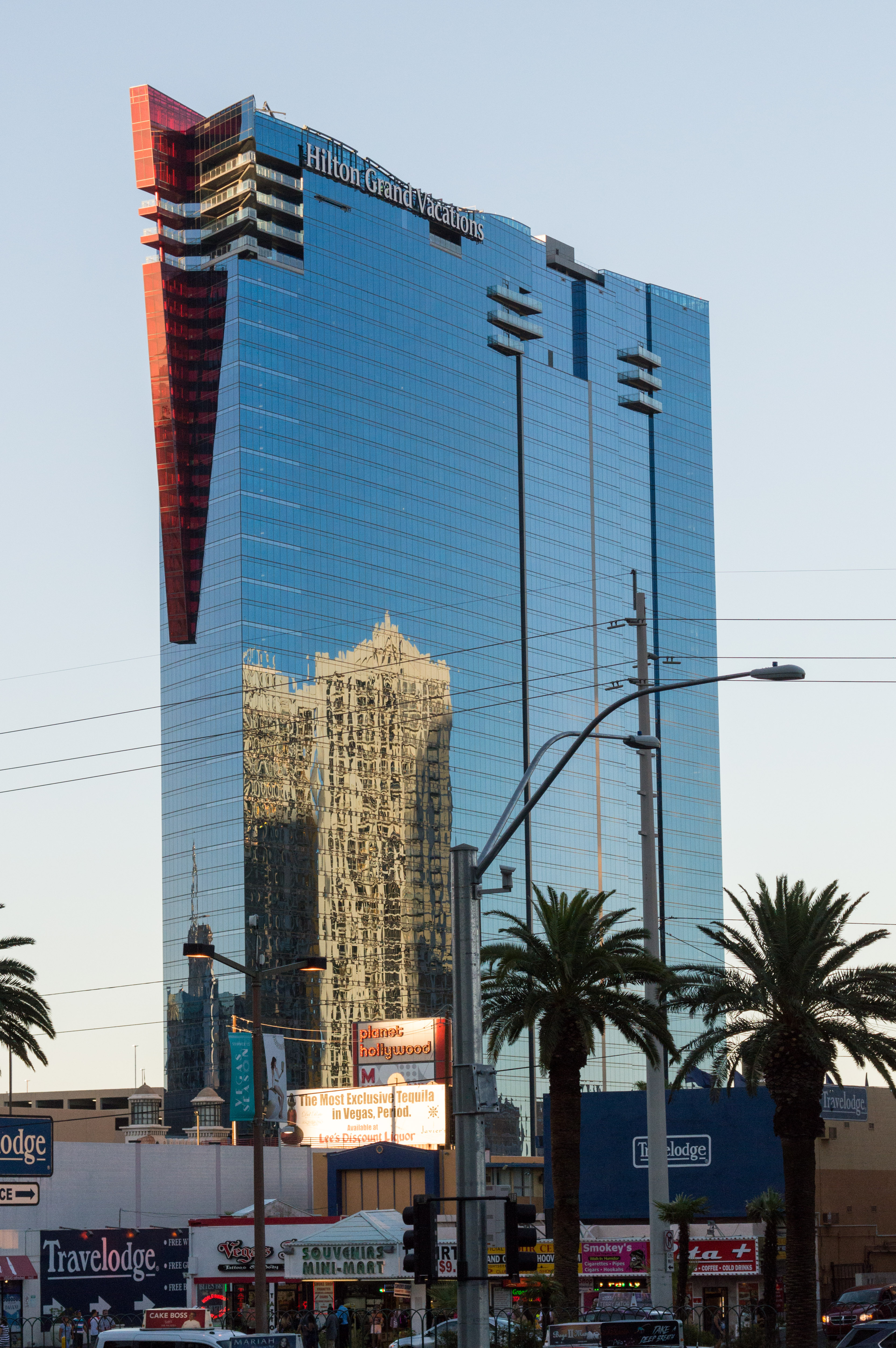
- Interactive map of the Elara area
- Former names: PH Towers

General information
- Status: Completed
- Type: timeshare
- Location: 80 East Harmon Avenue, Paradise, Nevada, United States
- Coordinates: 36°6′30.65″N 115°10′7.75″W
- Groundbreaking: January 19, 2006
- Topped-out: July 2, 2008
- Opened: December 18, 2009
- Cost: $660 million
- Owner: LV Tower 52 LLC
- Operator: Hilton Grand Vacations Company

Technical details
- Floor count: 50

Design and construction
- Architect: Gerald Koi
- Developer: Westgate Resorts
- Other designers: DiLeonardo International (interior)
- Main contractor: Tutor-Saliba Corporation

Other information
- Number of units: 1,201

Website
- www3.hilton.com/en/hotels/nevada/elara-by-hilton-grand-vacations-center-strip-LASCSGV/index.html

Elara (formerly PH Towers) is a 50-story timeshare building and non-casino hotel at 80 East Harmon Avenue in Paradise, Nevada, located behind the Planet Hollywood resort that operates on the Las Vegas Strip.

After two projects failed to materialize on the property, Robert Earl and David A. Siegel partnered in 2005 to develop a hotel and timeshare project known as PH Towers. Groundbreaking took place in January 2006, and the tower was topped off in July 2008. The $660 million project opened in December 2009, but plans for additional towers were cancelled.

When it opened, the tower featured 1,201 units, approximately 200 of which would be used as timeshares, while the remainder would be used as hotel rooms for the Planet Hollywood resort. The tower was owned by Siegel's Westgate Resorts, while Earl's Planet Hollywood International, Inc. marketed the tower and handled operations. Harrah's Entertainment purchased the Planet Hollywood resort in 2010, and took over marketing and operations of PH Towers. Because of financial difficulty, Westgate Resorts sold the tower in 2011, and Hilton Grand Vacations Company was appointed to rebrand it and to handle sales and marketing. The tower was renamed as Elara in March 2012.

== History ==
=== Original plans ===
In 1998, Aladdin Gaming was planning a new Aladdin resort on the Las Vegas Strip, as well as the adjacent Aladdin Music Project, a $250 million resort that would include 1,000 hotel rooms and a 50,000 sq ft (4,600 m^{2}) casino. The Aladdin Music Project, part of a planned Aladdin complex, was to be developed in partnership with Planet Hollywood International, Inc., and would be built on 5 acres (2.0 ha) located southeast of the Aladdin at the intersection of Harmon Avenue and Audrie Street. However, Aladdin Gaming ended its partnership in late 1998, because of concerns that Planet Hollywood could not produce a $41 million commitment to the Aladdin Music Project.

In June 2000, Aladdin Gaming was in talks with an unnamed partner to develop a high-rise hotel and condominium project on Audrie Street, located behind the Aladdin resort, which was still under construction. The project was envisioned as a $200 million complex that would include 100 to 150 condominium units and would provide easy access to the Aladdin resort. Richard Goeglein, chief executive of Aladdin Gaming, said a deal had not been signed but that "long term, we definitely want to do it." In the proposed plan, Aladdin Gaming would sell approximately one acre, located at the northeast corner of the Aladdin property, to the partner in exchange for minority ownership in the new project. The partner would be the majority owner and would provide the necessary funds to develop and manage the hotel and condominium units.

In November 2000, it was announced that the five-acre parcel, southeast of the Aladdin, would be sold to The Athena Group LLC, New York. At the time, the site for the proposed project was occupied by temporary construction trailers that were used during construction of the Aladdin and its Desert Passage shopping mall, both of which opened in August 2000. The Athena Group planned to close on the deal by February 2001, and hoped to finish building the project within two years. At that time, the project was planned to include 350 hotel rooms and between 150 and 200 condominium units. The condominium portion of the project would encompass 800,000 sq ft (74,000 m^{2}). The project was expected to stand between 35 and 40 stories, but plans had yet to be finalized as to whether the project would include one tower or two towers. The project was to be connected to Desert Passage. In August 2001, Aladdin officials announced that the project had been cancelled and that there were plans to sell the five-acre property to aid the Aladdin resort, which was financially struggling.

=== Timeshare project and construction ===
Robert Earl, founder and chief executive of Planet Hollywood International Inc., led a group that purchased the Aladdin resort in June 2003. Earl, a resident of Orlando, Florida, had been neighbors with Westgate Resorts founder David A. Siegel. Earl and Siegel began discussing a Las Vegas timeshare project in 2000, when Westgate entered the timeshare market there. After Earl's group purchased the Aladdin, discussions about a Las Vegas timeshare project became serious.

Details were finalized over the course of 16 months until April 2005, when Westgate Resorts announced that it would build a 52-story, $400 million timeshare tower on the five-acre property southeast of the Aladdin. Westgate was to finance the project, which would be managed by Starwood. Construction was to begin later that year, with completion of the first units scheduled for New Year's Eve 2007. Unsold timeshare units were to be used as hotel rooms for the Aladdin resort, which was to undergo a $120 million renovation to become the Planet Hollywood resort. Las Vegas-based Klai Juba Architects was hired to design the Planet Hollywood makeover as well as the timeshare tower, which was to consist of blue glass.

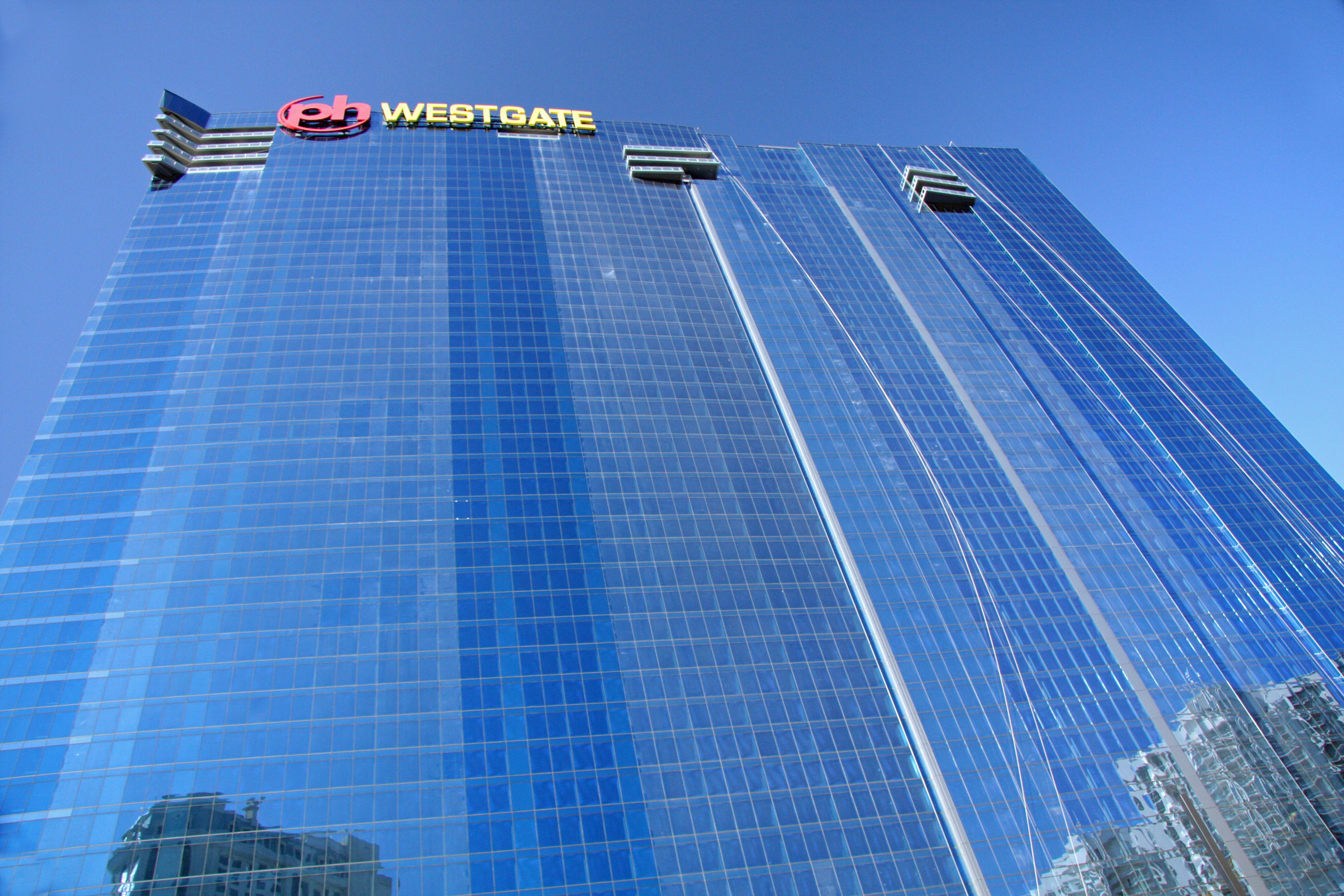
PH Towers in October 2009, viewed from East Harmon Avenue

Groundbreaking for the $750 million Planet Hollywood Towers began on the morning of January 19, 2006. By that time, Gerald Koi of Morris Architects was the project's designer, while DiLeonardo International was tasked with creating interior designs. Bovis Lend Lease was to oversee construction, with the tower's opening expected in late 2007. The tower ultimately became known as PH Towers, with Tutor-Saliba Corporation as the contractor.

The tower, located on 4 acres (1.6 ha), was topped off on July 2, 2008, during a ceremony that included actor Sylvester Stallone and Nevada governor Jim Gibbons as guests. PH Towers' opening had initially been set for August 21, 2009. In July 2009, Planet Hollywood began hiring 800 workers for PH Towers, which was to have a soft opening that October, followed by the official grand opening a month later. By late September 2009, the tower's opening was scheduled for December. At the time, two additional towers were planned to be opened by November 2013. The first tower was completed at an ultimate cost of $660 million. Construction never began on additional towers.

=== Opening and renaming ===
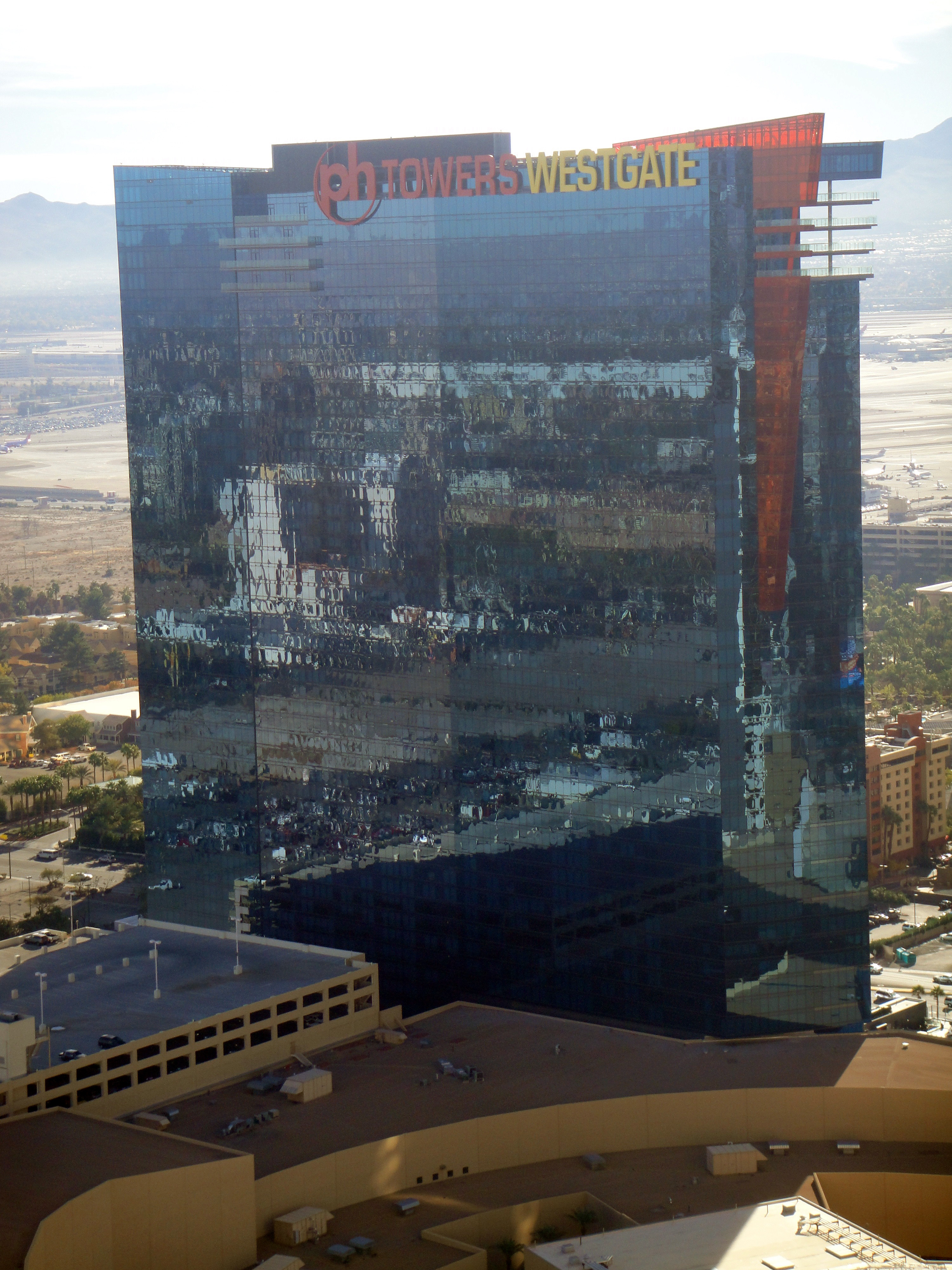
PH Towers in 2010

The first residents moved into the tower on December 18, 2009, as part of a soft opening, while hotel guests were expected to occupy the building beginning on December 28, followed by an official opening planned for January 2010. A pool was expected to open in the summer. The tower was promoted as the world's largest timeshare building, and the sign alongside the top of the building contained the largest letters of any sign on the Las Vegas Strip. The tower was also the first timeshare project to be connected to a major casino resort.

The tower contained 1,201 units and 28 penthouses, and was owned by Westgate Resorts, while Planet Hollywood was the marketing and operating partner. Approximately 200 units were to be used as timeshares, while the remainder would be used as hotel rooms for the Planet Hollywood resort. When PH Towers opened, the Planet Hollywood resort was in the process of being sold to Harrah's Entertainment, which become the tower's new marketer and operator the following year.

Westgate Resorts began suffering from effects caused by the Great Recession, as banks were declining to finance sales at the tower. In November 2011, Resort Finance America LLC acquired a controlling interest in the tower and appointed Hilton Grand Vacations Company to rebrand the tower as part of the Hilton vacations company. Hilton would also provide vacation ownership sales as well as marketing services. At the time, there were more than 12,000 owners in the timeshare tower, who were not to be affected by the sale. The tower was subsequently sold to LV Tower 52 LLC. On March 1, 2012, the property was renamed as "Elara, a Hilton Grand Vacations Club." The tower was featured in the 2012 documentary film, The Queen of Versailles. By 2017, the resort was known as "Elara by Hilton Grand Vacations."

== Construction lawsuit ==
After three months of negotiations, Tutor-Saliba Corporation filed a $19.3 million lawsuit against Westgate Resorts in May 2010, alleging that it was owed money for constructing the tower. Mark Waltrip, chief operating officer for Westgate Resorts, denied the allegation and said that Tutor-Saliba owed Westgate Resorts $18 million, "including overcharges, credits due for unperformed work, liquidated damages for untimely performance and failure to comply with the plans and specifications of the project." Waltrip also said, "We have exhausted every effort to work cooperatively with Tutor-Saliba to resolve these issues."

The trial began in October 2012, and was expected to last four weeks. In 2013, the Clark County District Court ruled that Tutor-Saliba was owed $19.3 million by Westgate Resorts. The decision was appealed, but the Nevada Supreme Court upheld the decision in Tutor-Saliba's favor in May 2017.

== See also ==
- Hilton Grand Vacations Club, another timeshare property located on the Las Vegas Strip.
- List of integrated resorts
