= Hilton Grand Vacations =

American timeshare company

Hilton Grand Vacations Inc.
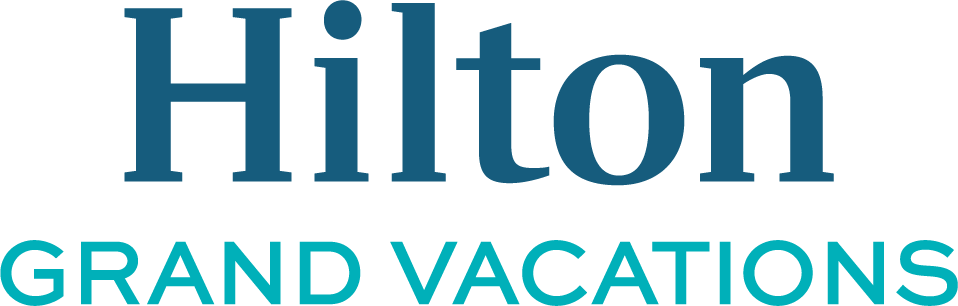
- Type: Public
- Traded as: NYSE: HGV; S&P 400 component
- Industry: Timeshares
- Founded: 1992; 34 years ago
- Founder: Hilton Worldwide
- Headquarters: Orlando, Florida, U.S.
- Number of locations: Over 200; 92 Under Hilton Branding
- Area served: North America; Europe; Asia; Caribbean
- Key people: Mark Wang (CEO)
- Products: Timeshare(s)
- Brands: Hilton Grand Vacation Club; Hilton Vacation Club; Hilton Club; Diamond Resorts; Embarc Resorts; Bluegreen Vacations
- Subsidiaries: Diamond Resorts; Embarc Resorts; Bluegreen Corporation
- Website: hgv.com

Hilton Grand Vacations Inc. is a multi-national company that is based in Orlando, Florida, United States. It manages and operates the Hilton Worldwide timeshare and vacation ownership brands under an exclusive licensing agreement with Hilton Worldwide. HGV was formerly a wholly owned subsidiary of Hilton Worldwide until it was spun off into a publicly traded company in 2017. Even though HGV is an independent company post spin-off, Hilton Worldwide still retains full ownership of the Hilton Grand Vacation Club, Hilton Vacation Club, and Hilton Club brands that HGV manages and operates for them. These timeshare brands are all part of Hilton Worldwide's portfolio of 22 hotel and resort brands.

As of December 2023, HGV has over 700,000 club members and over 200 properties. 92 of the properties are under the Hilton Worldwide timeshare brands (Hilton Grand Vacation Club, Hilton Vacation Club, and Hilton Club), and the remaining properties are under HGV's subsidiary brands (Diamond Resorts, Embarc Resorts, and Bluegreen Corporation).

Dealing in timeshares and vacation ownership, Hilton Grand Vacations develops, manages, markets, and operates a system of vacation club ownership resorts under the Hilton Worldwide timeshare brands. HGV also has several subsidiary brands which are not brands which came from their purchase of smaller independent timeshare companies, but HGV plans to rebrand the majority of these resorts to the Hilton timeshare brands. Resort villas are jointly owned by members who have exclusive use of the properties for limited periods of time through a points-based ownership system. Club members can also exchange their points or interval weeks for vacations at affiliated resorts worldwide, and they are eligible to become part of the Hilton Honors program.

== History ==
Hilton Grand Vacations was launched in 1992 as a subsidiary of Hilton Worldwide, this was the first venture into the timeshare and vacation ownership industry by the Hilton brand. In 2017 HGV was spun off from Hilton Worldwide into a separate publicly traded company, allowing for HGV to be able to focus solely on the timeshare and vacation ownership aspect of the Hilton brand.

The purpose of the 2017 spin-off of Hilton Grand Vacations (and Hilton's lodging real estate investment trust now known as Park Hotels & Resorts) from Hilton Worldwide into separate companies was to transform Hilton Worldwide into an asset-light company, making it more efficient for its shareholders due to it having less capital investments. This means that following the spin-offs, Hilton Worldwide now mainly owns the Hilton brands and not the majority of the physical properties that bear the Hilton name, meaning that it is not responsible for their operation or real estate costs, thus driving up their profits and shareholder value. For HGV this means that Hilton Worldwide owns and licenses the Hilton timeshare brands to HGV in a very similar fashion to how it licenses its hotel brands to the independent franchisees and companies that own and operate the majority of its hotels. Perhaps the largest benefit of the spin-off is the fact that it allows HGV to focus solely on its particular business sector, thus growing and expanding the Hilton timeshare brands at a faster rate.

On March 10, 2021, Hilton Grand Vacations announced its intention to acquire Diamond Resorts for $1.4 billion. The acquisition was completed on August 2, 2021.

On November 6, 2023, Hilton Grand Vacations announced its intention to acquire Bluegreen Corporation for $1.5 billion. The acquisition was completed on January 17, 2024.

== Agreement with Hilton Worldwide ==
HGV has an exclusive licensing agreement with Hilton Worldwide which makes them the only company able to operate, manage, market, and develop the Hilton timeshare brands. In exchange for the license to operate the Hilton timeshare brands, as well as the intellectual property associated with them, HGV pays Hilton Worldwide a license fee of 5% of gross revenues quarterly. These gross revenues include vacation ownership sales or re-sales, property operations revenue, transient rental revenue, and all other revenues earned through the Hilton branded properties.

As part of this licensing agreement with Hilton Worldwide, HGV is required to participate in the Hilton Honors loyalty program. This means that all HGV owners can utilize the program to stay at other Hilton branded properties, and it also means that Hilton Honors members can use their points to stay at HGV resorts. In addition, all HGV resorts appear on Hilton's website and are able to be booked at nightly rates through the Hilton site.

HGV is required to follow strict brand standards when it comes to their operation and management of Hilton branded properties. Under the licensing agreement, Hilton Worldwide has the right to enter and inspect any of HGV's Hilton branded properties at any time without notice to ensure compliance with the licensing agreement and brand standards. Additionally, HGV must obtain approval from Hilton Worldwide before they can modify existing properties, or develop and operate any additional properties under the Hilton timeshare brands.

== Brands and subsidiaries ==
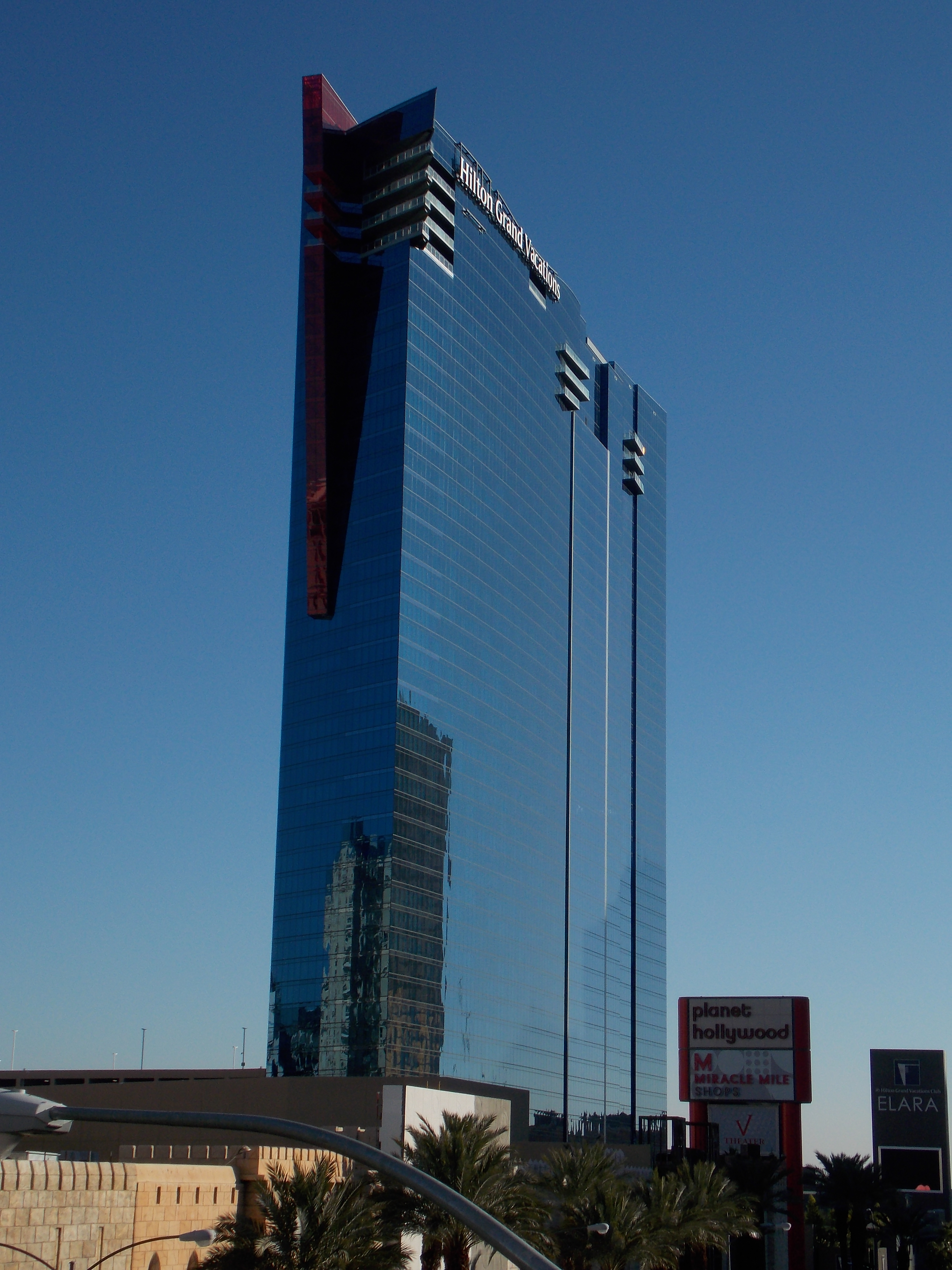
Elara, a Hilton Grand Vacations Club in Las Vegas

The Hilton Grand Vacation Club consists of the original Hilton Grand Vacations timeshare resorts; these resorts are considered the top-tier properties in the Hilton Grand Vacations portfolio.

The Hilton Vacation Club consists of resorts that were once a part of Diamond Resorts or Bluegreen Corporation but have now been rebranded as Hilton properties.

The Hilton Club consists of destinations that are in urban settings and are located in the downtown areas of popular major cities. These properties are often HGV exclusive sections of existing Hilton branded hotels rather than standalone resorts.

Diamond Resorts is a wholly owned subsidiary of Hilton Grand Vacations. It was once a separate timeshare resort and ownership company until it was purchased by HGV in 2021. The majority of Diamond Resorts properties will be rebranded to Hilton Vacation Club resorts, but some will retain the Diamond Resorts name.

Embarc Resorts is a wholly owned subsidiary of Hilton Grand Vacations. It was once a separate timeshare resort and ownership company until it was purchased by Diamond Resorts in 2015, and when HGV purchased Diamond in 2021 it was added to the list of HGV subsidiaries. Many of the Embarc properties are being rebranded to Hilton Grand Vacation Club resorts, but some may retain the Embarc name.

Bluegreen Vacations is a wholly owned subsidiary of Hilton Grand Vacations. It was once a separate timeshare resort and ownership company until it was purchased by HGV in 2024. The majority of Bluegreen Vacations properties will be rebranded to Hilton Vacation Club resorts, but some will retain the Bluegreen Vacations name.

== Properties ==
Hilton Grand Vacation Club Properties
| Property | Location |
|---|---|
| Parc Soleil, a Hilton Grand Vacations Club | Orlando, Florida |
| Las Palmeras, a Hilton Grand Vacations Club | Orlando, Florida |
| SeaWorld Orlando, a Hilton Grand Vacations Club | Orlando, Florida |
| Tuscany Village, a Hilton Grand Vacations Club | Orlando, Florida |
| McAlpin Ocean Plaza, a Hilton Grand Vacations Club | Miami, Florida |
| Hilton Grand Vacations Club in Sandestin Golf and Beach Resort | Miramar Beach, Florida |
| Elara, a Hilton Grand Vacations Club | Las Vegas, Nevada |
| The Boulevard, a Hilton Grand Vacations Club | Las Vegas, Nevada |
| Paradise, a Hilton Grand Vacations Club | Las Vegas, Nevada |
| Flamingo, a Hilton Grand Vacations Club | Las Vegas, Nevada |
| Trump International Hotel Las Vegas, a Hilton Grand Vacations Club | Las Vegas, Nevada |
| Ocean Tower, a Hilton Grand Vacations Club | Big Island (Hawaii) |
| The Bay Club, a Hilton Grand Vacations Club | Big Island (Hawaii) |
| Kings' Land, a Hilton Grand Vacations Club | Big Island (Hawaii) |
| Kohala Suites, a Hilton Grand Vacations Club | Big Island (Hawaii) |
| The Grand Islander, a Hilton Grand Vacations Club | Waikiki Beach, Hawaii |
| Hokulani Waikiki, a Hilton Grand Vacations Club | Waikiki Beech, Hawaii |
| Kalia Suites, a Hilton Grand Vacations Club | Waikiki Beach, Hawaii |
| Grand Waikikian, a Hilton Grand Vacation Club | Waikiki Beach, Hawaii |
| Lagoon Tower, a Hilton Grand Vacations Club | Waikiki Beach, Hawaii |
| Maui Bay Villas, a Hilton Grand vacations Club | Maui, Hawaii |
| Ocean Enclave, a Hilton Grand Vacations Club | Myrtle Beach, South Carolina |
| Club 22, a Hilton Grand Vacations Club | Myrtle Beach, South Carolina |
| Anderson Ocean Club, a Hilton Grand Vacations Club | Myrtle Beach, South Carolina |
| Ocean Oak Resort, a Hilton Grand Vacations Club | Hilton Head Island, South Carolina |
| MarBrisa, a Hilton Grand Vacations Club | Carlsbad, California |
| Hilton Grand Vacations Club Palm Desert | Palm Desert, California |
| Sunrise Lodge, a Hilton Grand Vacations Club | Park City, Utah |
| Chicago Magnificent Mile, a Hilton Grand Vacations Club | Chicago, Illinois |
| Valdoro Mountain Lodge, a Hilton Grand Vacations Club | Breckenridge, Colorado |
| Blue Mountain, a Hilton Grand Vacations Club | Blue Mountains, Ontario, Canada |
| Hilton Grand Vacations Club Whistler | Whistler, British Columbia, Canada |
| Tremblant, a Hilton Grand Vacations Club | Mont-Tremblant, Quebec, Canada |
| Borgo alle Vigne, a Hilton Grand Vacations Club | Selvatelle, Italy |
| Craigendarroch Lodges, Managed by Hilton Grand Vacations | Ballater, Scotland |
| Craigendarroch Suites, a Hilton Grand Vacations Club | Ballater, Scotland |
| Dunkeld House Lodges, Managed by Hilton Grand Vacations | Dunkeld, Scotland |
| Hilton Grand Vacations Club Zihuatanejo | Zihuatanejo, Mexico |
| La Pacifica Los Cabos, a Grand Vacations Club | Los Cabos, Mexico |
| The Crane, a Hilton Grand Vacations Club | Saint Philip, Barbados |
| Vilamoura, a Hilton Grand Vacations Club | Vilamoura, Portugal |

Hilton Vacation Club Properties
| Property | Location |
|---|---|
| Grande Villas, a Hilton Vacation Club | Orlando, Florida |
| Aqua Sol, a Hilton Vacation Club | Orlando, Florida |
| Mystic Dunes, a Hilton Vacation Club | Celebration, Florida |
| Polynesian Isles, a Hilton Vacation Club | Kissimmee, Florida |
| Daytona Beach Regency, a Hilton Vacation Club | Daytona Beach, Florida |
| The Cove on Ormond Beach, a Hilton Vacation Club | Ormond Beach, Florida |
| Crescent on South Beach, a Hilton Vacation Club | Miami Beach, Florida |
| Desert Retreat, a Hilton Vacation Club | Las Vegas, Nevada |
| Cancun Las Vegas, a Hilton Vacation Club | Las Vegas, Nevada |
| Polo Towers, a Hilton Vacation Club | Las Vegas, Nevada |
| The Modern, a Hilton Vacation Club | Honolulu, Hawaii |
| Hilton Vacation Club Ka'anapali Beach | Maui, Hawaii |
| The Point at Poipu, a Hilton Vacation Club | Kauai, Hawaii |
| Bent Creek Golf Village, a Hilton Vacation Club | Gatlinburg, Tennessee |
| Ocean Beach Club, a Hilton Vacation Club | Virginia Beach, Virginia |
| Oceanaire, a Hilton Vacation Club | Virginia Beach, Virginia |
| The Historic Powhatan, a Hilton Vacation Club | Williamsburg, Virginia |
| Hilton Vacation Club Lake Tahoe Resort | South Lake Tahoe, California |
| Tahoe Seasons, a Hilton Vacation Club | South Lake Tahoe, California |
| San Luis Bay Inn, a Hilton Vacation Club | Avila Beach, California |
| Rancho Manana, a Hilton Vacation Club | Cave Creek, Arizona |
| Varsity Club Tucson, a Hilton Vacation Club | Tucson, Arizona |
| Ridge on Sedona, a Hilton Vacation Club | Sedona, Arizona |
| Sedona Summit, a Hilton Vacation Club | Sedona, Arizona |
| Scottsdale Links Resort, a Hilton Vacation Club | Scottsdale, Arizona |
| Scottsdale Villa Mirage, a Hilton Vacation Club | Scottsdale, Arizona |
| Cabo Azul, a Hilton Vacation Club | Cabo San Lucas, Mexico |
| Flamingo Beach, a Hilton Vacation Club | Sint Maarten, Dutch Caribbean |
| Royal Palm, a Hilton Vacation Club | Sint Maarten, Dutch Caribbean |

Hilton Club Properties
| Property | Location |
|---|---|
| The Hilton Club - New York | New York City, New York |
| West 57th Street, a Hilton Club | New York City, New York |
| The Central at 5th, a Hilton Club | New York City, New York |
| The Quin, a Hilton Club | New York City, New York |
| The Residences, a Hilton Club | New York City, New York |
| The District, a Hilton Club | Washington, D.C. |
| The Bay Forest Odawara, a Hilton Club | Odawara, Japan |
| The Beach Resort Sesoko, a Hilton Club | Sesoko Island, Japan |
| Liberty Place Charleston, a Hilton Club | Charleston, South Carolina |

Diamond Resorts Properties
| Property | Location |
|---|---|
| Bell Rock Inn | Sedona, Arizona |
| Kohls Ranch Lodge | Payson, Arizona |
| Los Abrigados Resort & Spa | Sedona, Arizona |
| PVC at The Roundhouse Resort | Pinetop, Arizona |
| Varsity Clubs of America - Tucson | Tucson, Arizona |
| Desert Isle of Palm Springs | Palm Springs, California |
| Palm Canyon Resort | Palm Springs, California |
| Rivera Beach and Shores Resort | Capistrano Beach, California |
| Rivera Oaks Resort & Racquet Club | Ramona, California |
| The Historic Crags Lodge | Estes Park, Colorado |
| Alhambra Villas | Kissimmee, Florida |
| Barefoot'n Resort | Kissimmee, Florida |
| Bryan's Spanish Cove | Orlando, Florida |
| Charter Club resort of Naples Bay | Naples, Florida |
| Cypress Pointe Resort | Orlando, Florida |
| Grand Beach | Orlando, Florida |
| Liki Tiki Village | Winter Garden, Florida |
| Orbit One Vacation Villas | Kissimmee, Florida |
| Parkway International Resort | Kissimmee, Florida |
| Varsity Clubs of America - South Bend | Mishawaka, Indiana |
| The Suites at Fall Creek | Branson, Missouri |
| Villas de Santa Fe | Santa Fe, New Mexico |
| Beachwoods Resort | Kitty Hawk, North Carolina |
| Fairway Forest Resort | Sapphire, North Carolina |
| Sunrise Ridge Resort | Pigeon Forge, Tennessee |
| Cedar Breaks Lodge & Spa | Brian Head, Utah |
| Beach Quarters Resort | Virginia Beach, Virginia |
| Boardwalk Resort and Villas | Virginia Beach, Virginia |
| Greensprings Vacation resort | Williamsburg, Virginia |
| Turtle Cay Resort | Virginia Beach, Virginia |
| Alpine Club | Schladming, Austria |
| Le Club Mougins | Mougins, France |
| Royal Regency Paris Vincenness | Paris, France |
| Palazzo Catalani | Lazio, Italy |
| Vilar do Golf | Algarve, Portugal |
| Los Amigos Beach Club | Mijas Costa, Costa del Sol, Spain |
| Royal Oasis Club at Pueblo Quinta | Benalmádena, Costa del Sol, Spain |
| Sahara Sunset | Benalmádena, Costa del Sol, Spain |
| Cromer Country Club | Norfolk, England |
| Pine Lake Resort | Carnforth, England |
| The Kenmore Club | Perthshire, Scotland |
| Thurnham Hall | Lancashire, England |
| Woodford Bridge Country Club | Devon, England |
| Wychnor Park Country Club | Staffordshire, England |
| White Sands Beach Club | Arenal d'en Castell, Menorca |
| Club Cala Blanca | Mogán, Canary Islands |
| Club del Carmen | Puerto del Carmen, Canary Islands |
| Jardines del Sol | Playa Blanca, Canary Islands |
| Royal Sunset Beach Club | Costa Adeje, Tenerife, Canary Islands |
| Royal Tenerife Country Club | Golf del Sur, Tenerife, Canary Islands |
| Santa Barbara Golf and Ocean Club | Golf del Sur, Tenerife, Canary Islands |
| Sunset Bay Club | Costa Adeje, Tenerife, Canary Islands |
| Sunset Harbour Club | Costa Adeje, Tenerife, Canary Islands |
| Sunset View Club | Golf del Sur, Tenerife, Canary Islands |

Embarc Properties
| Property | Location |
|---|---|
| Embarc Panorama | Panorama, Canada |
| Embarc Ucluelet | Ucluelet, Canada |
| Embarc Vancouver | Vancouver, Canada |

Bluegreen Vacations Properties
| Property | Location |
|---|---|
| Cibola Vista Resort and Spa | Peoria, Arizona |
| The Club at Big Bear Villaga | Big Bear Lake, California |
| Streamside at Vail | Vail, Colorado |
| The Innsbruck at Aspen | Aspen, Colorado |
| Bayside Resort and Spa | Panama City Beach, Florida |
| Daytona SeaBreeze | Daytona Beach Shores, Florida |
| Dolphin Beach Club | Daytona Beach Shores, Florida |
| Fantasy Island Resort II | Daytona Beach Shores, Florida |
| Casa Del Mar | Ormond Beach, Florida |
| Grande Villas at World Golf | St. Augustine, Florida |
| The Fountains Resort | Orlando, Florida |
| Orlando Sunshine Resort | Orlando, Florida |
| Via Roma Resort | Bradenton Beach, Florida |
| Resort Sixty-Six | Holmes Beach, Florida |
| Gulfstream Manor | Gulf Stream, Florida |
| Solara Surfside | Surfside, Florida |
| The Hammocks at Marathon | Marathon, Florida |
| The Studio Homes at Ellis Square | Savannah, Georgia |
| Hotel Blake | Chicago, Illinois |
| The Marquee | New Orleans, Louisiana |
| Bluegreen Club at La Pension | New Orleans, Louisiana |
| The Breakers | Dennis Port, Massachusetts |
| The Soundings | Dennis Port, Massachusetts |
| Mountain Run at Boyne | Boyne, Michigan |
| The Falls Village | Branson, Missouri |
| Paradise Point | Hollister, Missouri |
| The Wilderness Club at Big Cedar | Ridgedale, Missouri |
| The Cliffs at Long Creek | Ridgedale, Missouri |
| South Mountain Resort | Lincoln, New Hampshire |
| Bluegreen Club 36 | Las Vegas, Nevada |
| The Manhattan Club | New York City, New York |
| Blue Ridge Village | Banner Elk, North Carolina |
| Club Lodges at Trillium | Cashiers, North Carolina |
| The Suites at Hershey | Hershey, Pennsylvania |
| King 583 | Charleston, South Carolina |
| The Lodge Alley Inn | Charleston, South Carolina |
| SeaGlass Tower | Myrtle Beach, South Carolina |
| Carolina Grande | Myrtle Beach, South Carolina |
| Horizons at 77th | Myrtle Beach, South Carolina |
| Harbour Lights | Myrtle Beach, South Carolina |
| Shore Crest Vacation Villas | North Myrtle Beach, South Carolina |
| Mountain Loft | Gatlinburg, Tennessee |
| Laurel Crest | Pigeon Forge, Tennessee |
| Bluegreen Downtown Nashville | Nashville, Tennessee |
| Elian Hotel and Spa | San Antonio, Texas |
| Shenandoah Crossing | Gordonsville, Virginia |
| Patrick Henry Square | Williamsburg, Virginia |
| Parkside Williamsburg Resort | Williamsburg, Virginia |
| Christmas Mountain Village | Wisconsin Dells, Wisconsin |
| Bluegreen Odyssy Dells | Wisconsin Dells, Wisconsin |
