= Dennis Port, Massachusetts =

- Census-designated place
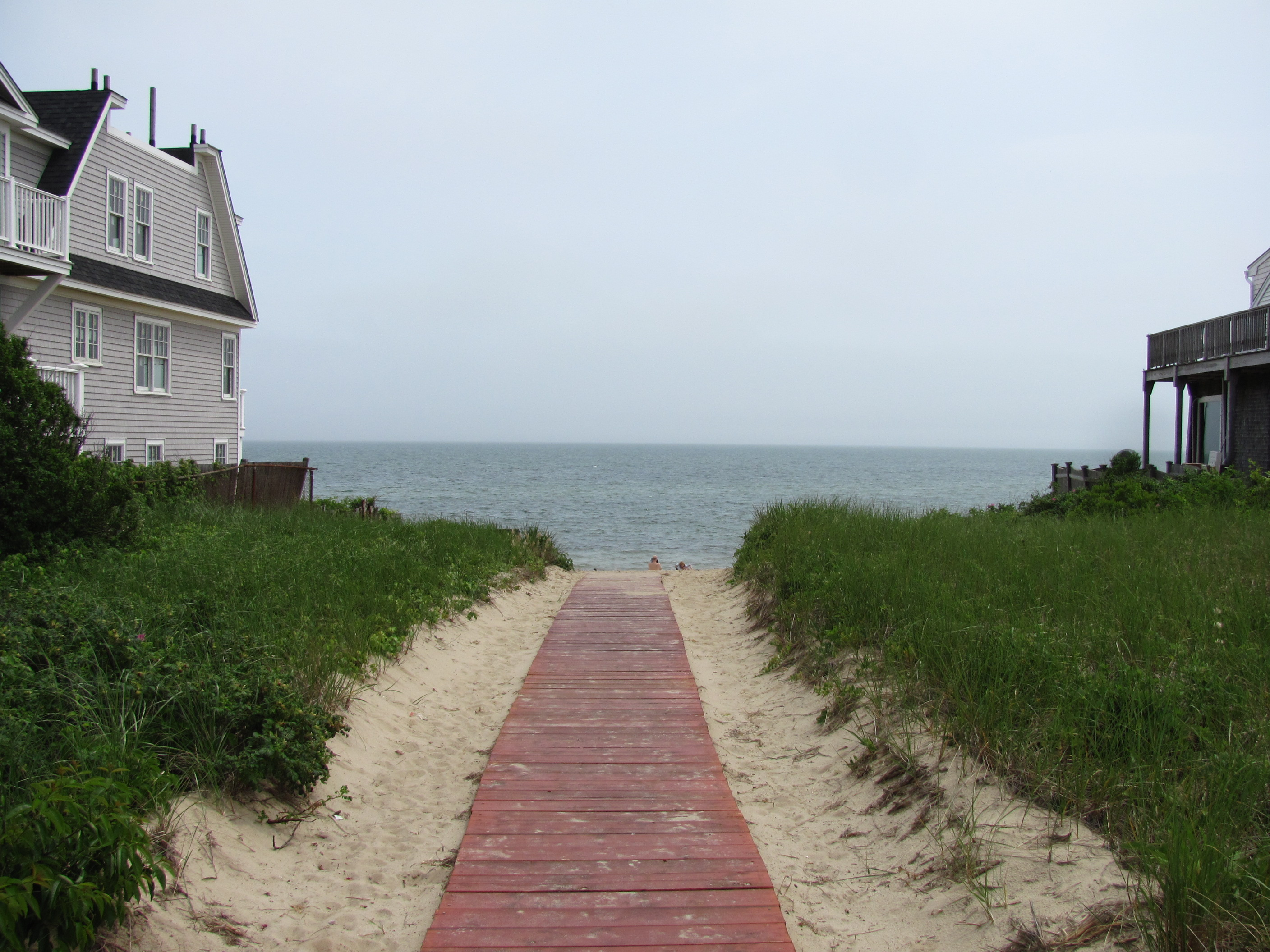
- Boardwalk to the Depot Street Beach

- Location in Barnstable County and the state of Massachusetts.
- Coordinates: 41°39′50″N 70°8′12″W
- Country: United States
- State: Massachusetts
- County: Barnstable
- Town: Dennis

Area
  - Total: 3.29 sq mi (8.53 km^{2})
  - Land: 3.04 sq mi (7.87 km^{2})
  - Water: 0.25 sq mi (0.66 km^{2})
- Elevation: 20 ft (6 m)

Population (2020)
  - Total: 3,487
  - Density: 1,147.7/sq mi (443.12/km^{2})
- Time zone: UTC-5 (Eastern (EST))
  - Summer (DST): UTC-4 (EDT)
- ZIP Codes: 02639 (Dennis Port); 02660 (South Dennis)
- Area code: 508
- FIPS code: 25-16810
- GNIS feature ID: 0615825

Dennis Port (or Dennisport) is a census-designated place (CDP) in the town of Dennis in Barnstable County, Cape Cod, Massachusetts, United States. As of the 2020 census, Dennis Port had a population of 3,487.

The Swan Pond River and Upper County Road demarcate Dennis Port's western border with West Dennis. The village of West Harwich lies directly to Dennis Port's east, with the border demarcated by the median of Division Street. To the north of Dennis Port is South Dennis. Like other villages along Nantucket Sound, Dennis Port features warm-water beaches, like Haigis Beach, Sea Street Beach, and Glendon Road Beach. Many consider these among Cape Cod's most desirable beaches for swimming and windsurfing.

By U.S. standards, real estate prices in Dennis Port remain high. Housing stock consists mostly of World War II–era beach cottages built in the Cape Cod architectural style, although many have been expanded or replaced with larger, more contemporary beach houses.

Famous residents of Dennis Port include U.S. military hero Benjamin F. Baker.

== Geography ==
Dennis Port is located at 41°39′50″N 70°8′12″W (41.663779, -70.136576).

According to the United States Census Bureau, the CDP has a total area of 8.5 square kilometres (3.3 sq mi), of which 3.0 square miles (7.8 km^{2}) is land and 0.27 square miles (0.7 km^{2}) (7.72%) is water.

Dennis Port is said by locals to be a part of the Lower Cape Cod region, unlike the rest of Dennis villages.

== Demographics ==
Historical population
Census	Pop.	Note	%±
2020	3,487		—
U.S. Decennial Census

=== 2020 census ===
As of the 2020 census, Dennis Port had a population of 3,487. The median age was 53.1 years. 12.7% of residents were under the age of 18 and 30.2% of residents were 65 years of age or older. For every 100 females there were 90.1 males, and for every 100 females age 18 and over there were 87.9 males age 18 and over.

100.0% of residents lived in urban areas, while 0.0% lived in rural areas.

There were 1,807 households in Dennis Port, of which 15.8% had children under the age of 18 living in them. Of all households, 32.9% were married-couple households, 24.8% were households with a male householder and no spouse or partner present, and 36.7% were households with a female householder and no spouse or partner present. About 46.0% of all households were made up of individuals and 22.5% had someone living alone who was 65 years of age or older.

There were 5,157 housing units, of which 65.0% were vacant. The homeowner vacancy rate was 2.4% and the rental vacancy rate was 6.7%.

Racial composition as of the 2020 census
Race	Number	Percent
White	2,798	80.2%
Black or African American	262	7.5%
American Indian and Alaska Native	15	0.4%
Asian	42	1.2%
Native Hawaiian and Other Pacific Islander	3	0.1%
Some other race	84	2.4%
Two or more races	283	8.1%
Hispanic or Latino (of any race)	157	4.5%

=== 2000 census ===
As of the census of 2000, there were 3,612 people, 1,719 households, and 943 families residing in the CDP. The population density was 455.8 people/km^{2} (1,181 people/mi^{2}). There were 4,369 housing units at an average density of 551.3 units/km^{2} (1,428 units/mi^{2}). The racial makeup of the CDP was 90.03% White, 4.90% African American, 0.36% Native American, 0.39% Asian, 1.74% from other races, and 2.57% from two or more races. Hispanic or Latino of any race were 2.99% of the population.

There were 1,719 households, out of which 20.4% had children under the age of 18 living with them, 39.6% were married couples living together, 11.9% had a female householder with no husband present, and 45.1% were non-families. 37.9% of all households were made up of individuals, and 16.8% had someone living alone who was 65 years of age or older. The average household size was 2.06 and the average family size was 2.68.

In the CDP, the population was spread out, with 17.9% under the age of 18, 6.2% from 18 to 24, 28.1% from 25 to 44, 24.2% from 45 to 64, and 23.6% who were 65 years of age or older. The median age was 43 years. For every 100 females, there were 87.3 males. For every 100 females age 18 and over, there were 84.2 males.

The median income for a household in the CDP was $36,518, and the median income for a family was $41,525. Males had a median income of $36,568 versus $29,398 for females. The per capita income for the CDP was $23,872. About 10.5% of families and 10.7% of the population were below the poverty line, including 19.6% of those under age 18 and 6.1% of those age 65 or over.

== Notable person ==
- Susan H. Wixon (1839–1912), freethought writer, editor, feminist, and educator
